= Take Your Daughter to Work Day (The Office) =

- The Office episode
- From left to right, Melissa, Abby, Jake, and Sasha bored during a meeting.
- Episode no.: Season 2 Episode 18
- Directed by: Victor Nelli, Jr.
- Written by: Mindy Kaling
- Cinematography by: Randall Einhorn
- Editing by: David Rogers
- Production code: 2018
- Original air date: March 16, 2006
- Running time: 22 minutes

Guest appearances
- Spencer Daniels as Jake Palmer; Jazz Raycole as Melissa Hudson; Craig Robinson as Darryl Philbin

Episode chronology
← Previous "Dwight's Speech"	Next → "Michael's Birthday"
- The Office (American TV series) season 2

"Take Your Daughter To Work Day" is the eighteenth episode of the second season of the American comedy television series The Office and the show's twenty-fourth episode overall. It was written by Mindy Kaling and directed by Victor Nelli, Jr. It first aired on March 16, 2006, on NBC. The episode guest stars Jazz Raycole as Melissa Hudson, Delaney Ruth Farrell as Sasha Flenderson, Spencer Daniels as Jake Palmer, and Jake Kalender as a young Michael Scott.

The series depicts the everyday lives of office employees in the Scranton, Pennsylvania branch of the fictional Dunder Mifflin Paper Company. In this episode, Take Your Daughter to Work Day results in four children spending the day at the office—Toby Flenderson's (Paul Lieberstein) daughter Sasha, Stanley Hudson's (Leslie David Baker) daughter Melissa, Kevin Malone's (Brian Baumgartner) fiancée's daughter Abby, and Meredith Palmer's (Kate Flannery) son Jake. Pam Beesly (Jenna Fischer) tries to befriend at least one child, Melissa hits on Ryan Howard (B. J. Novak), Michael Scott (Steve Carell) tries to impress the children by claiming he was a child star, and Dwight Schrute (Rainn Wilson) struggles to show his secret girlfriend Angela Martin (Angela Kinsey) that he can be stern with children.

"Take Your Daughter to Work Day" was one of the last episodes filmed for the season. Due to the presence of actual children on the set, all of the main cast members had to tone down their behavior, making sure that no one cursed or told inappropriate jokes. The installment received largely positive reviews from television critics. "Take Your Daughter to Work Day" received a Nielsen rating of 4.2 and was seen by 8.8 million viewers.

== Plot ==
Michael Scott is frustrated that Take Your Daughter to Work Day will force him to tone down his office antics, and says that he would never want to be a father. Toby Flenderson and Stanley Hudson bring their daughters, Sasha and Melissa respectively, Kevin Malone brings his fiancée's daughter, Abby, and Meredith Palmer brings her son, Jake. Because she is getting married soon and hopes to become a mother, Pam Beesly is determined to befriend one child by the end of the day. She tries with Abby (who instead takes a liking to Jim Halpert) and Melissa (who she inadvertently alienates by talking positively about her stepmother). Jim enlists Abby in helping him make sales. Sasha walks into Michael's office and plays with his toys, and after he jokes she becomes fond of him.

Melissa persistently flirts with Ryan Howard, making him uncomfortable since Melissa is in 8th grade. Kelly Kapoor alerts Stanley to the situation. Misunderstanding, Stanley chews out Ryan for flirting with Melissa.

Dwight Schrute begins to read one of his childhood cautionary tales to the children, but Michael orders him to stop upsetting the kids. Michael shows the children and staff a video of him as a child appearing on a kid's show, where he revealed his dream was to "get married and have 100 kids, so I can have 100 friends, and no one can say 'no' to being my friend." He retreats into his office when he realizes that he does in fact want to be a father, and has been unable to realize that dream. Toby talks to Michael, restoring his self-confidence, and he decides to start online dating (with the user name "Little Kid Lover"). Dwight is tormented by Jake, shaming him in the eyes of Angela Martin, who believes men should be stern with children. Dwight upsets Jake with a childish insult, which quietly pleases Angela. Pam wins over Jake with the paper shredder. Jim gets out of a dinner invite from Abby by claiming he has a date, to Pam's chagrin. Michael and Dwight end the work day by singing "Teach Your Children".

== Production ==
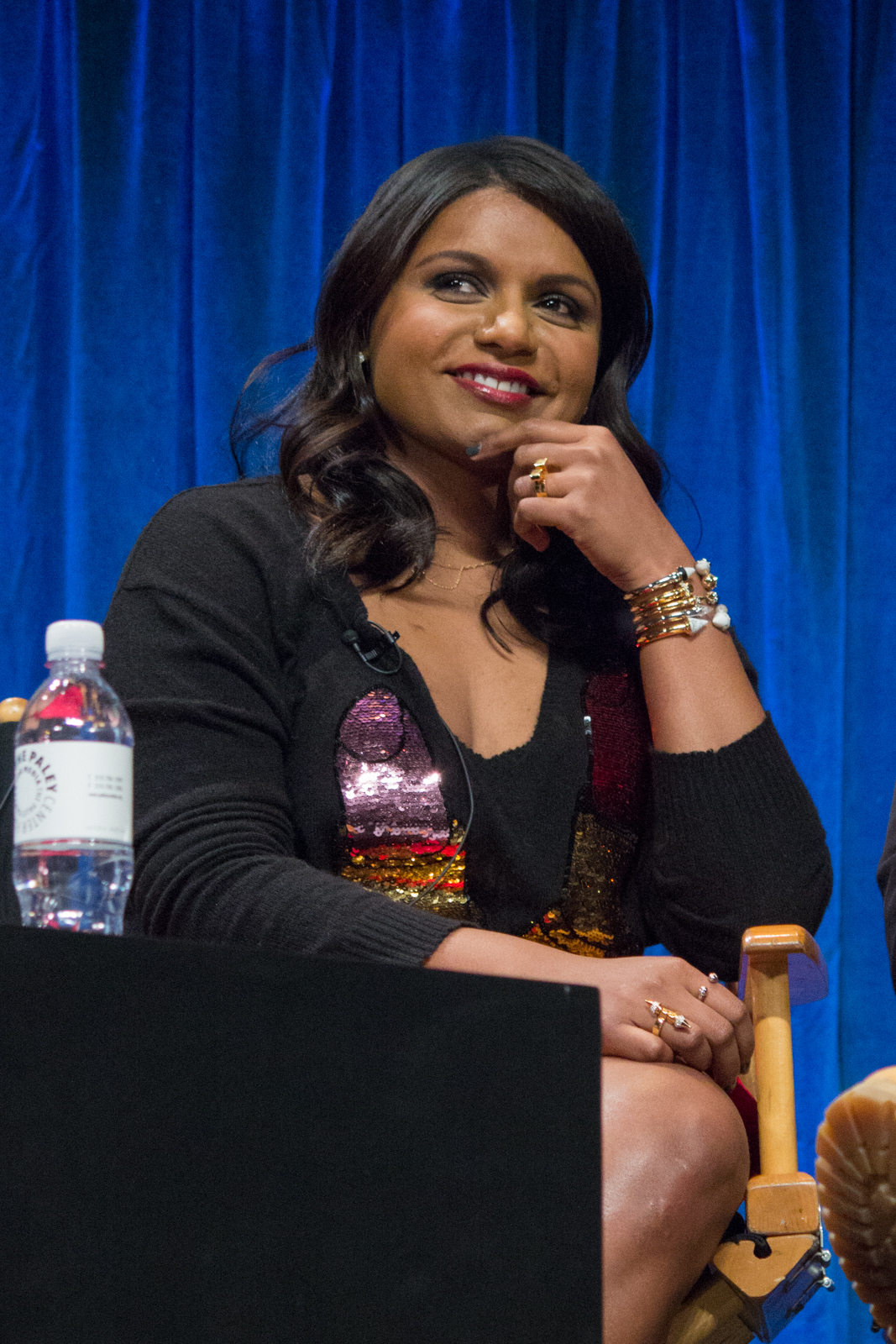
The episode was written by Mindy Kaling.

"Take Your Daughter to Work Day" was written by Mindy Kaling, who portrayed Kelly Kapoor on the series. The episode was directed by Victor Nelli Jr., making it his second directoral credit after the earlier episode "The Carpet". The episode was one of the last installments filmed for the season. In addition, the episode took five days to film. Each day, over twelve hours was devoted to filming. The episode guest stars Jazz Raycole as Melissa Hudson, Delaney Ruth Farrell as Sasha Flenderson, Spencer Daniels as Jake Palmer, and Jake Kalender as a young Michael Scott.

Jenna Fischer noted that, due to the presence of actual children on the set, "everyone had to be on their best behavior", meaning that there was no "cursing and no dirty jokes allowed". She later said that "we aren't a 'G-rated' bunch by nature." Fischer later joked that "candy is one of my weaknesses", but she was able to get through the filming of the episode without eating any of it. She explained that during the filming of the earlier second season episodes "Halloween" and "Valentine's Day", she had eaten a majority of the candy the crew put on her desk.

The second season DVD contains a number of deleted scenes from this episode. Notable cut scenes include the Party Planning Committee squabbling over what pizza toppings to order, Stanley complaining that his daughter is spoiled, Dwight discovering an eraser in his coffee courtesy of Jake, and Jim giving Abby an official certificate of appreciation.

== Cultural references ==
Pam notes that by putting out candy to lure in children, she is acting just like the witch in the fairy tale "Hansel and Gretel". Michael complains about having to censor himself with children around; he compares himself to Eddie Murphy in his movie Raw (1987) and says "they" want to turn him into Murphy from Daddy Day Care (2003). Michael claims that he is like Superman defending Gotham City. (Both Jim and Dwight correct him by noting that Batman is the defender of Gotham City, and Michael says that he is more like Aquaman.)

Jim and Abby discuss the book From the Mixed-Up Files of Mrs. Basil E. Frankweiler and talk whether they would want to spend a night in the Metropolitan Museum of Art or an aquarium. Sasha asks Phyllis if she is Mother Goose. Dwight reads the short story "Die Geschichte vom Daumenlutscher" from Heinrich Hoffmann's 1845 book Struwwelpeter. Michael refers to it as a book that Dwight's "Nazi war criminal" grandmother read to him. Michael argues that Dunder Mifflin is better than Office Depot with the children. He shows them his performance on Fundle Bundle, a parody of "those crappy little local kids' shows that used to fill time on Saturday mornings before there were such things as infomercials". Michael and Dwight end the work day by performing Crosby, Stills, Nash & Young's "Teach Your Children". In an episode of the Office Ladies podcast, it was revealed that "Fundle Bundle" was based on a show called The Land of Hatchy Milatchy, which aired in Scranton in the 1950s through the 1980s.

== Reception ==
"Take Your Daughter to Work Day" originally aired on NBC on March 16, 2006. The episode received a 4.2 rating/11 percent share among adults between the ages of 18 and 49. This means that it was seen by 4.2 percent of all 18- to 49-year-olds, and 11 percent of all 18- to 49-year-olds watching television at the time of the broadcast. The episode was viewed by 8.8 million viewers, and retained 93 percent of its lead-in My Name Is Earl audience.

The episode received largely positive reviews from critics. Francis Rizzo III of DVD Talk called the scene where the office realizes Michael's loneliness "absolutely one of the saddest moments I've seen in recent memory" and noted that "you can't help but feel for him". M. Giant of Television Without Pity gave the episode an "A". Brendan Babish of DVD Verdict called the entry "another great episode" for the series and awarded it an "A−". He noted that by bringing the supporting characters' kids into the office "hilarity ensues". Babish applauded the lack of an arching plot, allowing "Michael's faux pas" to take center stage. Michael Sciannamea of AOL TV called "Take Your Daughter to Work Day" the "best episode yet this season" and noted that "the writers will be hard-pressed to come up with a better story than this one." Sciannamea called "the transformation of Michael's indifference over the kids to one of acceptance and pure enjoyment of having them around" as the "most interesting aspect of the episode". He also called Dwight and Michael's sing-along near the end "the single funniest moment of the season".
