= Halloween (The Office) =

- The Office episode
- Episode no.: Season 2 Episode 5
- Directed by: Paul Feig
- Written by: Greg Daniels
- Cinematography by: Randall Einhorn
- Editing by: David Rogers
- Production code: 2006
- Original air date: October 18, 2005
- Running time: 22 minutes

Guest appearances
- Leslie David Baker as Stanley Hudson; Brian Baumgartner as Kevin Malone; Kate Flannery as Meredith Palmer; Mindy Kaling as Kelly Kapoor; Angela Kinsey as Angela Martin; Paul Lieberstein as Toby Flenderson; Oscar Nunez as Oscar Martinez; Phyllis Smith as Phyllis Lapin

Episode chronology
← Previous "The Fire"	Next → "The Fight"
- The Office (American season 2)

"Halloween" is the fifth episode of the second season of the American comedy television series The Office and the show's eleventh episode overall. It was written by executive producer and showrunner Greg Daniels and was directed by Paul Feig. The episode first aired on NBC in the United States on October 18, 2005. Guest stars in this episode included Devon Abner, Hugh Dane, George Gaus, Annabelle Kopack, Ava Nisbet and Alec Zbornak.

The series depicts the everyday lives of office employees in the Scranton, Pennsylvania branch of the fictional Dunder Mifflin Paper Company. In this episode, the employees at Dunder Mifflin celebrate Halloween at the office. Michael Scott (Steve Carell) struggles with making the decision of whom to fire. Meanwhile, Jim Halpert (John Krasinski) and Pam Beesly (Jenna Fischer) post Dwight Schrute's (Rainn Wilson) resume on the internet.

Due to the Halloween concept of the episode, the cast members of The Office were allowed to wear costumes rather than their "usual, realistically plain suits". B. J. Novak, writer for the series as well as actor, called the experience "fun". The episode features the last on-screen appearance of the background character Devon until the series finale. The episode earned a Nielsen rating of 4.1 in the 18–49 demographic and was viewed by 8 million viewers.

== Plot ==
Michael Scott was informed early in October that he must fire somebody by the end of the month. On the last day of the month, Halloween, he still has not fired anyone, not wanting to give up any employees or make any of them hate him. Meanwhile, Jim Halpert and Pam Beesly post Dwight Schrute's résumé on the internet, and when a prospective employer (Cumberland Mills in Maryland) calls, Jim pretends to be Michael and gives Dwight a great reference. When the company calls Dwight to set up an interview, Dwight ruins his chances by arguing with the caller over the importance and relevance of martial arts on his résumé. Pam says that Jim should apply for the Cumberland Mills position. Jim is quietly hurt by the suggestion that Pam would not miss him if he left.

After he hears Jim mocking his indecisiveness about the firing, Michael is inspired to ask Jim to roleplay firing someone with him. Afterwards he calls Creed Bratton into his office to fire him. Creed convinces Michael to let Devon White go instead. After Michael fires Devon, Devon angrily rebuffs Michael's attempts to save their friendship, and invites everyone in the office (except Michael, Creed, Dwight and Angela) to join him at a local bar. As Jim leaves, Pam apologizes for pushing him into taking the Cumberland job and assures him that she would "blow her brains out" if he ever left. Jim admits to the camera that Pam is the only thing keeping him there. When the group leaves the office, Devon smashes a pumpkin over Michael's car in revenge.

== Production ==
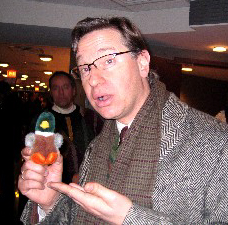
The episode was directed by Paul Feig (pictured).

"Halloween" is the third episode written by the series developer, executive producer, and show runner Greg Daniels. The episode was directed by Paul Feig, his second credit after "Office Olympics". This episode is the only episode to date to have a quote to play over the Deedle-Dee Productions title card in the closing credits. The quote features Dwight Schrute exclaiming "Quiet, you!"

Daniels came up with the idea of an episode centered on an employee getting fired, but wanted to focus on the perspective of a boss having to deal with the dilemma of letting an employee go. Since Daniels could not fire a series regular due to their contracts, and did not want to fire a supporting character due to the work that went into establishing them, he narrowed down the decision to either Creed or Devon, who at the time were both background characters. Scenes with both characters being fired were filmed so that Daniels could decide which one to fire after filming was completed, based on the performances, but Pam actress Jenna Fischer believes what ultimately led Daniels to make a decision was his discovery that the actor Devon Abner had an upcoming theatre contract that conflicted with the series' production.

During the pre-production for the episode, the cast and crew realized that the Halloween concept would allow the various cast members to wear costumes, rather than their "usual, realistically plain suits". B. J. Novak called the dress-up experience "fun", noting that "seeing the most serious of our plotlines play out alongside such silly and bizarre visuals was, I think, one of the most inspired ideas of the episode's writer, Greg Daniels." The idea for Pam to be dressed as a cat was inspired by several unused stories, created by Gene Stupnitsky, in which "Pam Beesley must disguise herself as a cat". The plot lines were vetoed by the show's writers, but Stupnitsky successfully petitioned to allow Pam to wear a cat costume.

"Halloween" marks the last appearance of Devon in an episode until the series finale, seven seasons later. Although Devon was only a background character, he is mentioned during "The Dundies", seen in the background of "The Fire", and is seen in a deleted scene during "Diversity Day". Devon is later seen in a deleted scene on "Valentine's Day", when Michael passes by a homeless Devon in New York. Devon then chases Michael, presumably still angry over the events of "Halloween". Guest stars in this episode included Devon Abner, Hugh Dane, George Gaus, Annabelle Kopack, Ava Nisbet and Alec Zbornak. Lisa Malone was uncredited in her speaking role as Jan's assistant, Sherry.

== Cultural references ==
Due to the presence of Halloween, many of the employees costumes reflect movie and literary characters. Kelly is dressed as Dorothy Gale, but Michael makes an insensitive remark about Bend It Like Beckham. Dwight is dressed as a Sith, one of the characters in the Star Wars universe capable of using the "dark side of the Force". Phyllis, however, confuses him for "some sort of monk". Kevin is dressed as a Dunder Mifflin super hero, with a costume design similar to Mr. Incredible. Creed is dressed like a vampire and Devon is dressed like a hobo. Pam, Phyllis, and Angela are all dressed up as cats. Oscar is dressed in drag, and Michael asks him if he is "flying his true colors", to which Oscar reacts defensively.

== Reception ==
"Halloween" was originally broadcast on NBC in the United States on October 18, 2005. The episode was viewed by 8 million viewers and received a 4.1 rating/10% share among adults between the ages of 18 and 49. This means that it was seen by 4.1% of all 18- to 49-year-olds, and 10% of all 18- to 49-year-olds watching television at the time of the broadcast. The episode was the number one ranked episode among adults, men, and women in the 18–34 demographic, and achieved its highest 18–49 rating since the season's premiere. "Halloween" retained 73 percent of its lead-in My Name Is Earl audience, its best lead-in retention at the time.

Erik Adams of The A.V. Club awarded the episode a "B+". He felt that the plot revolving around downsizing was "fitting", because the episode takes place on "Halloween", and that this plot returned Michael to the role of villain. Adams also felt that "director Paul Feig and credited writer Greg Daniels had a lot of fun dressing the show up for “Halloween,” framing Dwight like a shrouded Emperor Palpatine and making John Krasinski step into Steve Carell's shoes for a couple of great punchlines."

The episode received mostly positive reviews from television critics. Michael Sciannamea of TV Squad gave the episode a relatively positive review and noted that he "could certainly relate to [the] episode." Sciannamea also said that "great moment" in the episode was when "Michael tells Creed, who is dressed as a vampire, that he can spread his wings and fly to wherever he wants." "Miss Alli" of Television Without Pity rated "Halloween" a B+. Entertainment Weekly named Michael Scott's line, "I just hope that you and I can remain friends," one of "TV's funniest lines" for the week ending October 24, 2005.
