= Christmas Party (The Office) =

- The Office episode
- Episode no.: Season 2 Episode 10
- Directed by: Charles McDougall
- Written by: Michael Schur
- Cinematography by: Randall Einhorn
- Editing by: David Rogers
- Production code: 2010
- Original air date: December 6, 2005
- Running time: 22 minutes

Guest appearances
- David Koechner as Todd Packer; David Denman as Roy Anderson; Leslie David Baker as Stanley Hudson; Brian Baumgartner as Kevin Malone; Kate Flannery as Meredith Palmer; Mindy Kaling as Kelly Kapoor; Angela Kinsey as Angela Martin; Paul Lieberstein as Toby Flenderson; Oscar Nunez as Oscar Martinez; Phyllis Smith as Phyllis Lapin; Craig Robinson as Darryl Philbin; Bobby Ray Shafer as Bob Vance

Episode chronology
← Previous "Email Surveillance"	Next → "Booze Cruise"
- The Office (American season 2)

"Christmas Party" is the tenth episode of the second season of the American comedy television series The Office and the show's sixteenth episode overall. It was written by Michael Schur and directed by Charles McDougall. It was first broadcast on December 6, 2005, on NBC. The episode guest stars David Koechner as Todd Packer.

The series depicts the everyday lives of office employees in the Scranton, Pennsylvania branch of the fictional Dunder Mifflin Paper Company. In this episode, the office throws a Christmas party and plays Secret Santa. Jim Halpert (John Krasinski), having put much effort into finding a gift for Pam (Jenna Fischer), becomes frustrated when Michael Scott (Steve Carell) makes everyone play "Yankee Swap", and an iPod that Michael bought for Ryan Howard (B. J. Novak) becomes the hot object of the game.

The episode received positive reviews from television critics, with many applauding Michael's "Yankee Swap" scene. The episode was nominated for two Primetime Emmy awards, one for Outstanding Single-Camera Picture Editing for a Comedy Series, and one for Outstanding Writing for a Comedy Series. "Christmas Party" earned a Nielsen rating of 4.3 in the 18–49 demographic, being viewed by 9.7 million viewers, making it, at the time of its airing, the highest-rated episode of the season.

== Plot ==
The office staffers hold a "Secret Santa" gift exchange at their Christmas party. Jim Halpert received Pam Beesly's name, and got her a teapot filled with some mementos and a personal letter from him to her. Michael Scott buys a $400 video iPod as his gift to Ryan Howard, far exceeding the $20 limit. He is disappointed by the handmade oven glove he receives from Phyllis Lapin and insists on turning the exchange into a "Yankee Swap". This goes amiss as many of the gifts, such as a decorative name plate with Kelly Kapoor's name on it, are specific to the recipients. The staff competes for the iPod, and Pam opts to swap for it rather than keep Jim's gift. Phyllis is hurt when Michael trades away the oven glove with undisguised enthusiasm.

Jim's present for Pam ends up with Dwight Schrute. Jim tries to convince Dwight to do a post-swap with him, but Dwight refuses, saying he plans to use the teapot for nasal cleansing. Pam elects to trade the iPod for Jim's gift after her fiancé Roy tells her he was planning on getting her an iPod and has no other decent ideas for gifts, but to spare Jim's feelings she tells him she swapped out of appreciation for the effort he put into it. While she goes through the various aspects of her gift, Jim sneaks the letter for her into his pocket.

After ruining his staff's mood, Michael disobeys company policy by buying vodka for the party to compensate. Everyone ends up having a good time, with the exception of Angela Martin, who is furious over not receiving appreciation for her efforts toward arranging the party, as well as Kelly kissing Dwight, whom Angela is secretly dating. The party ends with a drunken Meredith Palmer exposing herself to Michael, who takes a picture and then leaves.

== Production ==
=== Writing ===
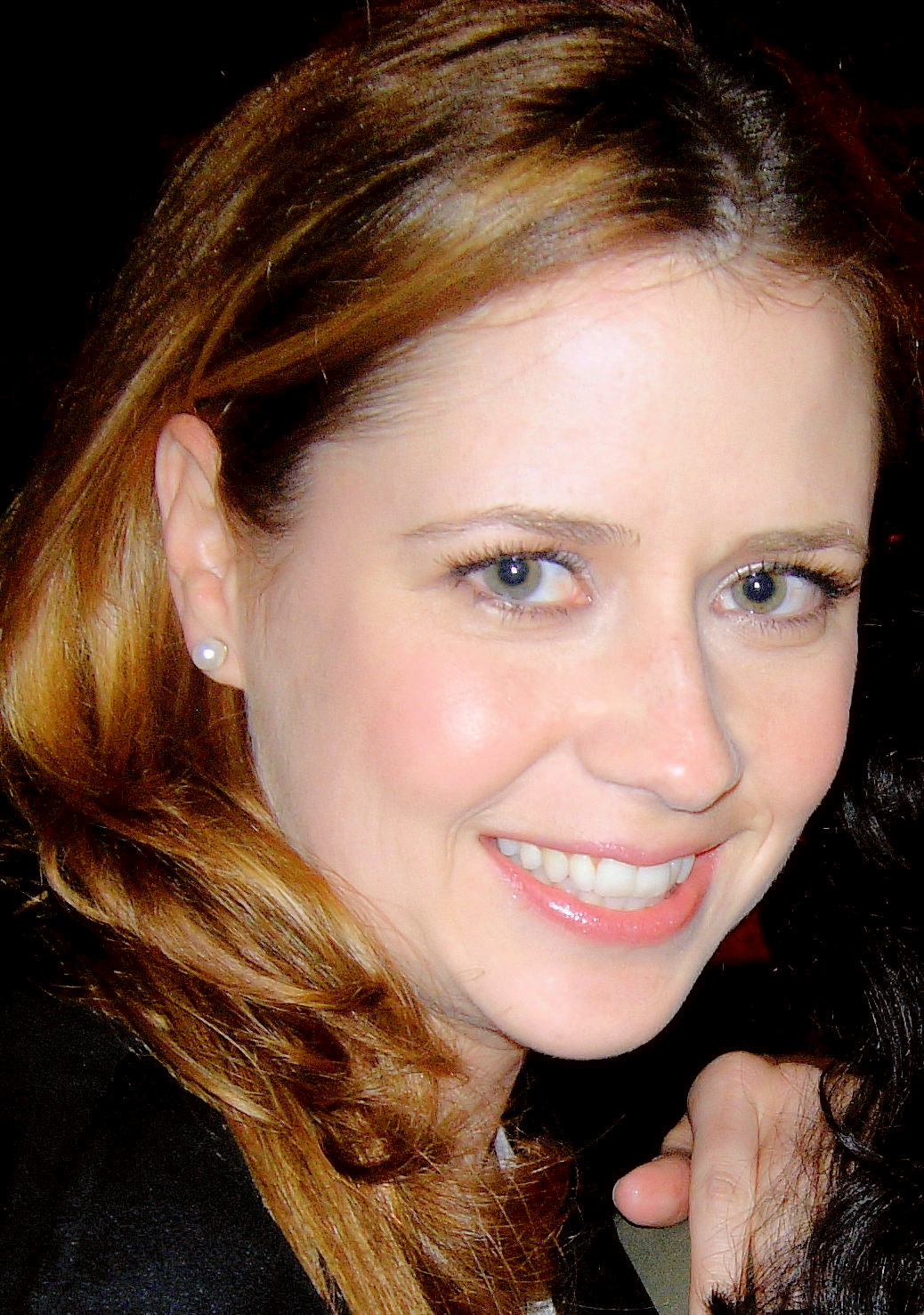
Jenna Fischer was allowed to pick the teapot used in the episode.

"Christmas Party" was written by Michael Schur, who portrays Mose Schrute in the series. The episode was his third contribution after the first season entry "The Alliance" and second-season episode "Office Olympics". B. J. Novak later noted that, compared to Schur's previous episode "The Alliance", the "driving force of the mayhem" in the episode is Michael's desire to make all of his workers "happy", rather than him being "a jerk". The scene wherein Dwight plugs the Christmas tree in, only for the office to be underwhelmed by the dismal lights was based on a real moment Schur and his wife experienced during their first Christmas together. Schur based the Christmas party sequences on a scene in Rushmore that happens after the main character does his Vietnam play. He noted that he wanted it to be "pastiche-y" and feature "small groups of people talking to each other". Meredith flashing Michael was based on a real-life experience Greg Daniels's dad had at a former job; at the end of one particular Christmas party, there was a stain on the office couch, which he called an "inappropriate ending" for the party. Daniels's father kept pressuring him to make a Christmas episode of The Office, and so Daniels utilized this experience.

Daniels was unsure as to what to call the Christmas exchange. He had heard the names "Nasty Christmas", "White Elephant", and "Yankee Swap" used to describe the game, and so he wrote all three into the script in order "to cover all regions of the country". Schur created a list of who receives what gift in order to preserve continuity in the episode. Gifts featured in the episode include Toby giving Angela a baby poster, Kelly getting Oscar a shower radio, Michael buying Ryan an iPod, Kevin buying a foot bath for himself, Creed giving Jim an old shirt, Oscar buying Creed a keychain, and Jim purchasing Pam a teapot. The teapot was chosen because it needed to fit other gifts inside of it, as well as be something that Dwight could have a use for later on in the episode. Fischer was allowed to pick the color of the teapot featured in the episode. She picked teal, due to it being her then-husband James Gunn's favorite color. Jenna Fischer recalled that fans always ask her what Jim wrote in Pam's note. Fischer noted that John Krasinski wrote the note himself and that the contents are "a secret". Jim finally gives Pam the note in the penultimate ninth season episode "A.A.R.M." In a 2020 interview on the Office Ladies podcast, Jenna Fischer later revealed that the note contained a personal message from Krasinski to Fischer on what their time on the show meant to Krasinski.

The writers for the show wanted Michael to "give a cool gift that the show's co-workers would later resent". They eventually decided that he would buy an iPod for Ryan. Apple Inc. received over four minutes of publicity for the device, despite the fact that the company did not pay for the placement. The poster that Toby gives to Angela was created by one of the show's prop workers. The two children in the poster were brought in from a talent agency. Naya Soto is the child pictured on the left. Schur revealed in the commentary for the episode that Stanley bought Kelly her nameplate, Dwight's paintballs were intended for Phyllis, Meredith bought Dwight shot glasses, Ryan got Toby a book of short stories, Angela purchased Stanley a picture frame, and Pam drew Meredith a picture of the office. Pam's picture was initially drawn by an on-staff artist. However, the producers felt that he was not able to capture Pam's "feminine side" and so several young female artists were asked to draw the building. One was eventually chosen, and the artists returned to draw Pam's doodles in the later episode "Boys and Girls".

=== Filming ===
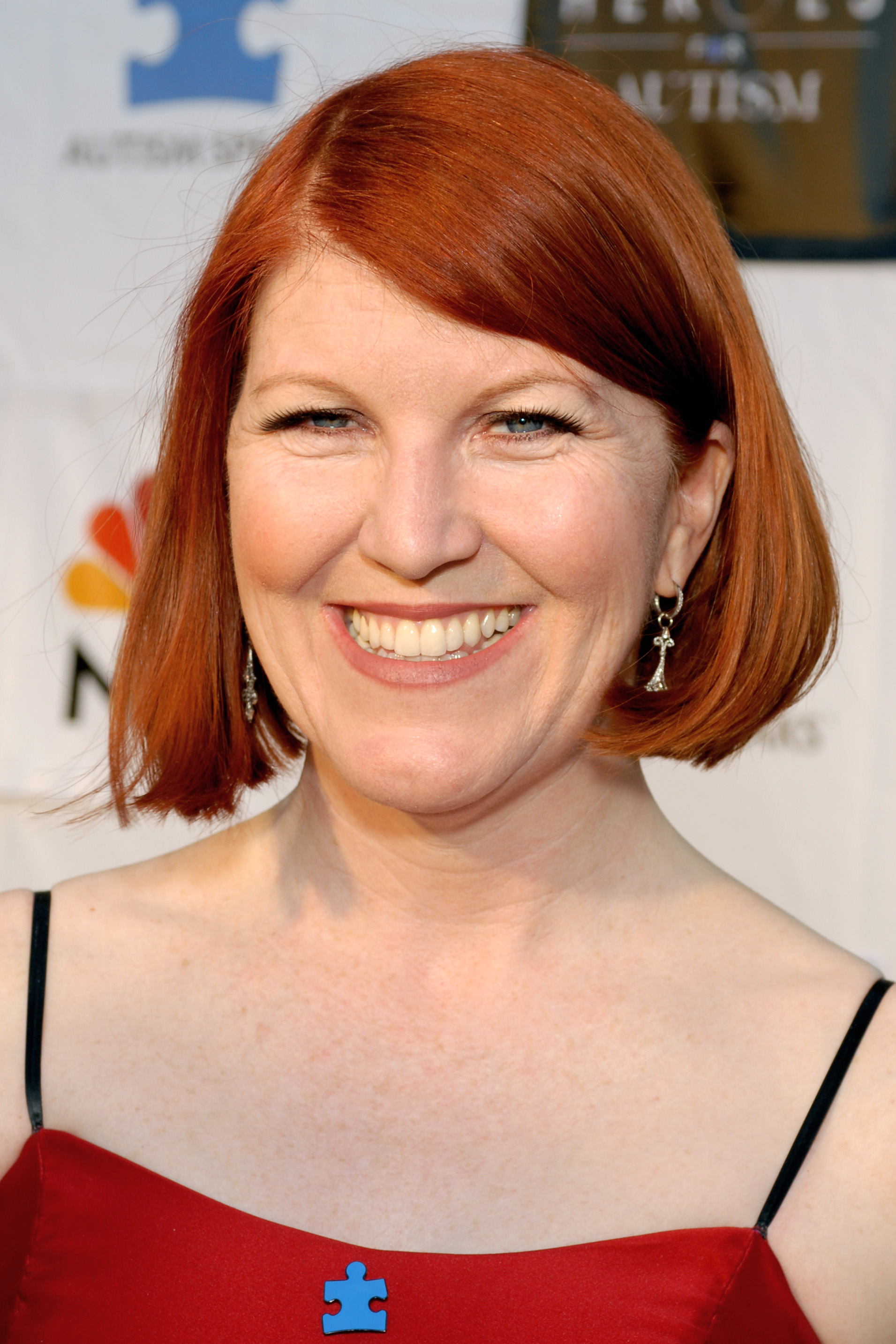
Actress Kate Flannery's "flashing" scene was filmed with no monitors, in order to preserve Flannery's modesty.

The episode was directed by Charles McDougall, his first credit for the series. According to Kinsey, McDougal, in order to set the characters' moods, would start every scene by saying "everyone happy, Angela pissed!" McDougal sought to bring movement to the Secret Santa scene, due to it being a largely stationary sequence. The cold opening was shot four different times, and almost every time, the ceiling tile that Michael displaces with a tree "crashed through the ceiling and almost killed Steve Carell". The scene wherein Angela starts crying when the Christmas party descends into chaos was based on a deleted scene from the earlier season two episode "The Fire", in which Angela starts crying during a talking head due to the stress of the situation. The fake snow was created by a company that specialized in producing fake snow. Daniels was initially worried that the shots would look fake, but he was pleased with the final results. According to Fischer, on the last day of shooting, the cast had a snowball fight—a scene that is included in the episode—which she called a "magic moment".

In order to make her scenes more real Phyllis Smith forced herself to cry for "30 minutes" between takes. Many of the cast members asked her what was wrong, but Smith refused to speak to them, in order to stay in character. The series' writers researched local Pennsylvania laws and discovered one that requires a liquor salesman must wear a tie. Thus, the show features a liquor store worker wearing a tie. Several of the scenes were improvised. During the sequence in which Angela angrily throws Christmas bulbs at a wall, Angela Kinsey was unable to get them to break, so she decided to stomp on them. Kate Flannery improvised her line about not drinking during the week while she was filming her talking head.

During the flashing scene, Carell told Flannery that he "wasn't staring at" her breasts; rather, he was looking at her clavicle. Despite what appears on camera, Flannery was not completely topless, as she was wearing pasties. The scene was shot several times; Flannery admitted that the shooting was excruciating and it felt like they had been shooting the one scene for "14 hours". To preserve Flannery's modesty, the series' monitors were shut off and the memory card for the digital camera was removed. Carell actually took pictures during the Christmas party shoot. All of the photos were released online.

The season two DVD contains a number of deleted scenes from this episode. Notable cut scenes include Oscar and Creed moving a desk, Dwight confirming that Phyllis is bringing a date to the party and Pam is not, Dwight saying he prefers the way humans give presents to the way bears give them, Kevin singing "Christmas in Hollis" by Run DMC, Oscar revealing that he was not really enthusiastic about the shower radio because Kelly gave him the same thing last year, Toby and Kelly doing a post-swap trade of the name plate for the book of short stories, and Michael explaining that Christmas is about seeing people envy the gifts that you give to others.

== Reception ==
"Christmas Party" originally aired on NBC in the United States on December 6, 2005. The episode received a 4.3 rating/10 percent share among adults between the ages of 18 and 49. This means that it was seen by 4.3 percent of all 18- to 49-year-olds, and 10 percent of all 18- to 49-year-olds watching television at the time of the broadcast. The episode was ranked number one in adults, men, and women in the 18–23 demographic and number one in all key adult male demographics as well. The episode was viewed by 9.7 million viewers, making it, at the time, the highest-rated episode of the season. An encore presentation of the episode on December 28 received a 3.2 rating/8 percent share and was viewed by over 6.5 million viewers and was ranked number one in the adults 18–34 demographic.

The episode received largely positive reviews from television critics. M. Giant of Television Without Pity gave the episode an "A" grade. Matt Fowler of IGN named the episode the second-best Christmas special of the series, calling it "a classic full of holiday cheer" with "one of the best comedic experiences ever". The Cincinnati Post named the episode, and specifically the scene where Michael makes the office play "Yankee Swap," one of the 2005 "Holiday Highlights". In addition, the episode was nominated for two Primetime Emmy awards, one for Outstanding Single-Camera Picture Editing for a Comedy Series, and one for Outstanding Writing for a Comedy Series.

Erik Adams of The A.V. Club awarded the episode an "A−", and applauded its vignette-style presentation, noting that this format "work[s] in the show’s favor". He also applauded the characterization of Michael, writing that it allowed him to "indulge in some David Brent-like behavior without it coming off as a lackluster impression or a bad shade on the show." Ultimately, he positively commented upon the fact that the episode started The Office's tradition of delivering usually strong Christmas-themed episodes.

Several lines from the episode were met with critical praise. Fowler cited Michael's line apologizing for Jesus' birthday being "so lame" as the best in the episode. TV Fanatic reviewed several of the quotes for the episode. The site ranked Kevin's admission that he got himself in Secret Santa, Dwight's declaration that "Yankee Swap" is like "Machiavelli meets Christmas", Michael's explanation about the true meaning of Christmas, and Michael's question about whether 15 bottles of vodka is enough "to get 20 people plastered", a five out of five.
