= Conflict resolution (disambiguation) =

Conflict resolution is the methods and processes involved in facilitating the peaceful ending of social conflict.

Conflict Resolution may also refer to:

- Conflict Resolution (album), a 2008 album by the Passive Aggressives
- "Conflict Resolution" (The Office), an episode of The Office
- Conflict resolution, dealing with multiple editors simultaneously changing the same source document in Revision control

== See also ==
- Journal of Conflict Resolution
