= Casino Night =

22nd episode of the 2nd season of The Office

- The Office episode
- Episode no.: Season 2 Episode 22
- Directed by: Ken Kwapis
- Written by: Steve Carell
- Cinematography by: Randall Einhorn
- Editing by: Dean Holland; David Rogers
- Production code: 2021
- Original air date: May 11, 2006
- Running time: 28 minutes

Guest appearances
- Nancy Walls as Carol Stills; Craig Robinson as Darryl Philbin; Marcus A. York as Billy Merchant

Episode chronology
← Previous "Conflict Resolution"	Next → "Gay Witch Hunt"
- The Office (American TV series) season 2

"Casino Night" is the second season finale of the American comedy television series The Office and the twenty-eighth episode overall. Written by Steve Carell, who also stars in the series as Michael Scott, and directed by Ken Kwapis, the episode originally aired in the United States on May 11, 2006, on NBC. The episode guest stars Nancy Carell as Carol Stills and Melora Hardin as Jan Levinson.

The series depicts the everyday lives of office employees in the Scranton, Pennsylvania branch of the fictional Dunder Mifflin Paper Company. In this episode, the office hosts a casino night, to which Michael Scott (Carell) inadvertently invites two dates. Meanwhile, Jim Halpert (John Krasinski) reveals to Pam Beesly (Jenna Fischer) his feelings for her.

The episode was the first of the series to run as a "supersized" episode, featuring twenty-eight minutes and twenty seconds of content rather than the standard twenty minutes and thirty seconds. In addition, the episode was the first of the series to be written by Carell; he had suggested the idea for the episode to executive producer Greg Daniels, who thoroughly enjoyed the idea and green lit the script. "Casino Night" also introduces the musical exploits of Kevin Malone, played by Brian Baumgartner. The episode received wide acclaim from television critics and earned a Nielsen rating of 3.9 in the 18–49 demographic, being seen by 7.7 million viewers. It is generally considered by both critics and audiences to be one of the show's greatest episodes.

== Plot ==
In the cold open, Jim Halpert attempts to convince Dwight Schrute that he can move inanimate objects through telekinesis. Jim "moves" a coatrack next to Pam Beesly's desk (in reality moved by Pam, using an umbrella, without Dwight seeing), shocking Dwight.

As he prepares for a charity casino night in the office building, Michael Scott invites his boss, Jan Levinson, to attend. She initially declines, and Michael instead invites his real estate agent, Carol Stills. However, Jan shortly thereafter reverses her earlier decision and tells Michael she will attend, leaving Michael with two dates.

Jim and Pam go through wedding band audition tapes, and are amused to discover that coworker Kevin Malone's Police cover band, "Scrantonicity", is among the submissions. Jim, upset about Pam's impending marriage to Roy Anderson, tells the documentary crew that he met with Jan about transferring to Dunder Mifflin's Stamford, Connecticut branch, because he has "no future" in Scranton.

During Casino Night, Dwight wins a game of craps and kisses Angela Martin on the cheek, disregarding their attempts to keep their intimate relationship a secret. She slaps him and walks away, with the two quietly enjoying the experience. Jan and Carol share an awkward conversation when they realize Michael has invited them both. As Jan takes a smoke break outside the building, she encourages Jim, also milling about outside, to tell others about his potential transfer. Jan reveals that she indeed did hook up with Michael. Kevin, a onetime World Series of Poker bracelet winner, is badly beaten at poker by Phyllis Lapin, but cheers up when Roy states his intent to hire Scrantonicity for his and Pam's wedding. Creed Bratton, an avowed kleptomaniac, finishes as the night's biggest "winner" after spending the entire night stealing poker chips, and wins a minibar from Vance Refrigeration (which he tells Bob Vance is the first refrigerator he has ever owned).

After Roy leaves, Jim approaches Pam in the parking lot and tells her that he is in love with her. A stunned Pam turns Jim down while assuring him of the importance of their friendship, but Jim apologizes for misinterpreting their relationship and walks away. Jan leaves Michael and Carol, noticeably upset from the night's events, and it is revealed she packed an overnight bag in her car, implying she had planned to spend the night with Michael.

Pam returns to the office and talks to her mother over the phone about Jim's confession. Jim enters the room and approaches her as she hastily hangs up. She begins to say something but Jim kisses her, and after hesitating, she returns the kiss, ending with the two staring at each other in silence.

== Production ==
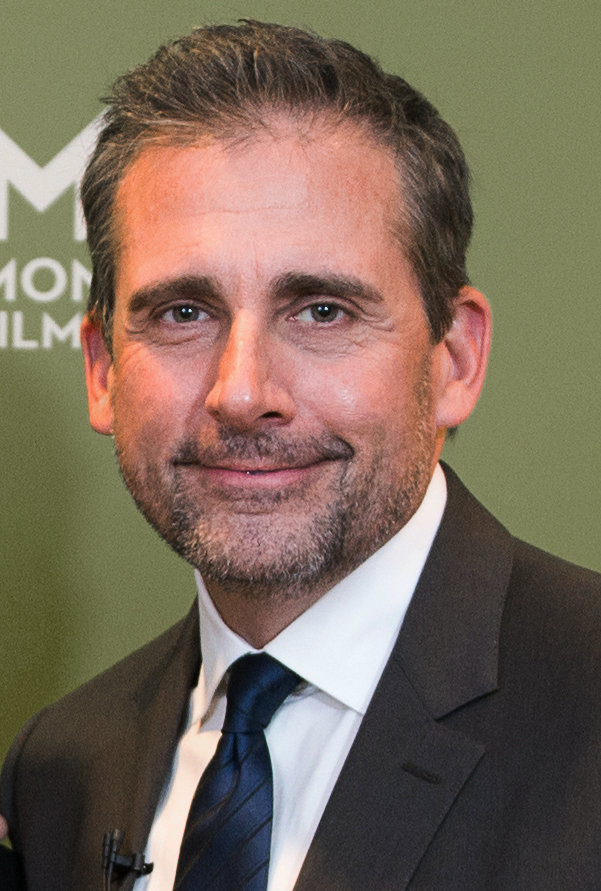
Actor Steve Carell (pictured) wrote "Casino Night".

"Casino Night" was the first episode of the series written by Steve Carell. Initially, Carell suggested to executive producer Greg Daniels that an episode should revolve around a casino night. When it came time to plan the finale for the show, Daniels chose the idea and picked Carell to write the script. Parts of the script were fleshed out during the flights to and from New York City when the show was filming the earlier episode "Valentine's Day". Later, Carell had only one weekend to write the bulk script. Daniels was very happy with the rough script and noted that Carell "came in with a great draft". Jenna Fischer admitted that filming the episode was a relief because she had "been carrying around the secret cliff-hangers for two months". Toby Flenderson, who is portrayed by writer Paul Lieberstein, stated during the episode "I'm gonna chase that feeling" after winning at a game of poker. The line was originally intended to lead to a subplot wherein Toby develops a gambling addiction, but the storyline was later abandoned.

The episode was the fifth episode of the season and the seventh of the entire series directed by Ken Kwapis. During the editing of the episode, executive producer Greg Daniels publicly addressed NBC in an interview, stating, "I'd like to get a supersized episode, because it's a really long script with a lot of good stuff." In response, fans of the show set up an online petition to "supersize" the season finale. The website generated over 2,800 signatures. On April 20, NBC announced it would be extending the season finale by ten minutes. Although other NBC shows Will & Grace and My Name Is Earl that aired on the same night had extended episodes, cast members David Denman and John Krasinski credited in interviews the petition for the extended time. Denman and Krasinski both believed that the petition was partially responsible for the other two shows getting extended times as well.

When filming the cold open, Fischer discovered that the prank as scripted would not work since the umbrella was not long enough to reach the coat rack, so the crew tied a string around the coat rack for her to pull on.

The filming of the episode's ending caused a "huge divide among the writing staff and the director and the cast". Carell, Kwapis, and the actors wanted the moment when Pam and Jim kiss to "follow the characters and the emotion of the moment" by having the action captured in full by the show's cameramen. The writing staff, on the other hand, wanted Pam and Jim's moment to be private and only heard via the mics; Daniels explained, "The writing staff was itching to do something kind of weird [with the scene] and have it be a private moment that the doc crew didn't know was going to happen and so only heard on their mics and came running around the corner to film."

The episode features Kevin Malone playing the drums in a band, which had been an idea circulated since the first season, when allusions to him being in a Steve Miller tribute band were written; the scenes had to be removed from the series due to issues negotiating with the singer. The crew later decided to have Kevin be in a Police tribute band called Scrantonicity because he "talks so low, and has very little expression, and there is no band that sings higher and with more expression than the Police." While Kevin was always intended to be the band's lead singer, executive producer Greg Daniels approached Baumgartner about possibly playing an instrument, but the actor replied he could not play anything. Daniels and Baumgartner then discussed instruments that would be "funny" to play and brought up harmonicas, saxophones, and drums. They ultimately decided on drums because they deemed a "drumming lead singer [to] be the funniest choice," regardless of the fact that the actor had "absolutely no drumming experience, and it's a difficult instrument."

The Season Two DVD contains the following deleted scenes from this episode: the staff playing Dunder Mifflin Mad Libs, Dwight and Jim choosing their charities, Dwight considering Jim's telekinetic powers, an extension of Michael's scene with Darryl, Pam finding planning a wedding stressful, and Meredith being recognized by the casino dealer.

== Cultural references ==
On the phone with Jan, Michael compares the performance of the Scranton branch of Dunder Mifflin to the biblical story of David and Goliath. He later tells her that she's the "Eva Peron to his Cesar Chavez". He later answers a phone from her by saying "Jan Levinson, I presume", a reference to the quote "Dr. Livingstone, I Presume", supposedly said by Henry Morton Stanley to David Livingstone after the former met the latter on the shores of Lake Tanganyika in 1871. Michael reasons that the money from the casino night should benefit the Boy Scouts of America because "They don't have cookies like the Girl Scouts!" He later states that he will donate all of his charity winnings to Comic Relief, a British charity. Kelly reasons that she would donate her winnings to Kobe Bryant's foundation, only because he bought his wife a large ring.

When Michael mentions donating money to "Afghanistanis with AIDS", the conversation gets confused, and the various office workers begin talking about Afghanis, Afghans, and the nonsensical "Afghanistanannis". In a talking head, Michael notes that AIDS is not a humorous disease, and is one of the many things that is off-topic in comedy, including the assassination of John F. Kennedy and the Holocaust. However, he notes that the assassination of Abraham Lincoln recently became funny. While looking through the various cover bands, Jim and Pam stumble upon a Kiss tribute and Jim tells Pam that her wedding should have three stages like Lollapalooza. Kevin's band is playing a cover of "Don't Stand So Close to Me" by the Police.

== Reception ==
=== Ratings ===
"Casino Night" originally aired on NBC in the United States on May 11, 2006. The episode received a 3.9 rating/10 percent share among adults between the ages of 18 and 49. This means that it was seen by 3.9 percent of all 18- to 49-year-olds, and 10 percent of all 18- to 49-year-olds watching television at the time of the broadcast. The episode was viewed by 7.7 million viewers, and retained 93 percent of its lead-in "My Name Is Earl" audience. For his work on this episode, Steve Carell was nominated for and won the Writers Guild of America Award for Television: Episodic Comedy.

=== Reviews ===
"Casino Night" received widespread critical acclaim from television critics. Michael Sciannamea of TV Squad stated that "This episode, the season finale, was, in a word, brilliant. You could not ask for a better way to tie up story lines that occurred over the course of a season while opening up new ones at the same time." Sciannamea went on to praise Carell's writing, as well as the progression of the relationship arcs in the show. Brian Zoromski of IGN said that "'Casino Night,' was full of great character development, awkward situations and laugh-out-loud moments." Zoromski enjoyed the unfolding of the Jim-Pam relationship during the latter half of season two, and the climax of it in the season finale. He also enjoyed and praised the development of two minor characters, Kevin Malone and Creed Bratton, the latter played by the actor of the same name. He ultimately awarded the episode a ten out of ten, denoting a "Masterpiece". Jacob Cliffton of Television Without Pity awarded the episode an "A". Gillian Flynn of Entertainment Weekly noted that, unlike other shows that featured resolved sexual tension, The Office was in no worry of being cancelled. She based this deduction on the fact that the show "isn't based entirely on the endearing flirtation between" Jim and Pam. In a 2011 poll conducted by fansite OfficeTally, fans voted "Casino Night" as their favorite of all Office episodes that had been aired at that time.
