= Gay Witch Hunt =

- The Office episode
- Episode no.: Season 3 Episode 1
- Directed by: Ken Kwapis
- Written by: Greg Daniels
- Cinematography by: Randall Einhorn
- Editing by: David Rogers
- Production code: 301
- Original air date: September 21, 2006
- Running time: 22 minutes

Guest appearances
- Creed Bratton as Creed Bratton; Charles Esten as Josh Porter; Ed Helms as Andy Bernard; Rashida Jones as Karen Filippelli

Episode chronology
| ← Previous "Casino Night" | Next → "The Convention" |
- The Office (American season 3)

"Gay Witch Hunt" is the third-season premiere of the American comedy television series The Office and the show's twenty-ninth episode overall. Written by executive producer and show runner Greg Daniels and directed by Ken Kwapis, the episode first aired in the United States on September 21, 2006, on NBC.

The series depicts the everyday lives of office employees in the Scranton, Pennsylvania branch of the fictional Dunder Mifflin Paper Company. In the episode, Michael Scott (Steve Carell) discovers that Oscar Martinez (Oscar Nunez) is gay. Michael tries to show Oscar that he is accepting of his sexual orientation, but only ends up insulting him. After kissing Pam Beesly (Jenna Fischer), Jim Halpert (John Krasinski) transfers to Stamford. In addition, Pam calls off her engagement with Roy Anderson (David Denman).

An estimated 9.1 million viewers watched the episode, a 23 percent increase from the previous season premiere "The Dundies". "Gay Witch Hunt" received positive reviews from television critics.

== Plot ==
Jim Halpert is revealed to have transferred to Dunder Mifflin's Stamford, Connecticut office from Scranton, with Ryan Howard taking over his old job.

After calling Oscar Martinez "faggy", Michael Scott is reprimanded by Toby Flenderson, who reveals to Michael that Oscar is in fact gay. While attempting to apologize, Michael inadvertently outs Oscar to the entire office. Jan Levinson berates Michael for his behavior, after Michael's seminar on homosexuality is a disaster. When Oscar threatens to quit, Michael attempts to reconcile with Oscar, first by hugging him, and then kissing him on the lips. Oscar is given three months paid vacation and use of a company car in exchange for not suing Dunder Mifflin.

In a flashback to the moments after their kiss, Pam Beesly confirms to Jim her intention to marry her fiancé, Roy Anderson. However, in the present, Pam reveals to the documentary crew that just days before the wedding, she got cold feet and called it off, moving into her own apartment and beginning to take art classes. Pam's rejection sent Roy into a downward spiral, hitting rock bottom with a drunk driving arrest. In an interview with the camera crew, Roy vows to win Pam back.

At Stamford, Jim meets smug co-worker Andy Bernard, who brags about his wild college days at Cornell University. Sales representative Karen Filippelli expresses uncertainty about Jim's interactions with the documentary crew, particularly his facial expressions. Jim pranks Andy by encasing his desk calculator in gelatin, but is surprised when Andy reacts with fury.

In a closing credits scene, Dwight receives a handheld metal detector as a gift from Jim, who has convinced Dwight it is a "gaydar" device. Dwight uses the device on Oscar, whose belt buckle sets it off, convincing Dwight that Jim was telling the truth; Dwight's own belt buckle also sets off the metal detector, perturbing him and amusing Pam.

== Production ==
"Gay Witch Hunt" was the eighth episode of the series directed by Ken Kwapis. Kwapis had previously directed "Pilot", "Diversity Day", "Sexual Harassment", "The Fire", "The Fight", "Booze Cruise", and "Casino Night". "Gay Witch Hunt" was written by executive producer and show runner Greg Daniels.

The kiss between Michael and Oscar in the conference room was scripted to be on the cheek, but according to Paul Lieberstein, "One take, [Michael actor] Steve [Carell] just won't let Oscar [Nunez] turn away. He got closer and closer and it just got creepy." The other cast members were laughing during the kiss but because the camera stays focused on Carell and Nunez, the scene was still usable. Nunez has said that the scene was shot a couple times without Carell kissing him at all.

At Paleyfest in early 2007, Steve Carell later recalled that he enjoyed the episode "because it spoke to the fact that Michael is not a homophobe; he just doesn't understand the world. They are two very different things. It's not that he's intrinsically racist or homophobic or sexist, he just doesn't have a frame of reference. He's not capable of understanding. And once he does glean some understanding he misinterprets it into something altogether. But I think at least the way I feel about the character is he's a decent heart, a decent person and he's just trying his best."

The third season DVD contains a number of deleted scenes from this episode, including Karen pulling a prank on Jim by programming the "9" button on his office phone to speed dial a Hong Kong number and then rebuffing his attempt to establish camaraderie, Andy demonstrating his vertical leap to Jim, Michael suggesting Pam use a body pillow as a surrogate for Roy, Jim explaining why he prefers Josh as a boss, and Michael updating the documentary crew on his relationship with Carol.

== Reception ==
"Gay Witch Hunt" first aired on NBC on September 21, 2006. The Nielsen ratings for "Gay Witch Hunt" indicated that it was watched by approximately 9.1 million viewers, a 23 percent increase from the second season premiere "The Dundies". During its timeslot, "Gay Witch Hunt" ranked second among men ages 18–49 and 24–54, and first among men ages 18–34.

"Gay Witch Hunt" generally received praise from critics. TV Guide's Matt Roush admitted that he "loved Oscar's self-deprecating reaction to his newfound notoriety". Roush said that when watching Michael "you can't help but forgive the idiot, while wondering how in the world he manages to keep his job," and that the kiss between Michael and Oscar was "horrifically funny". Brian Zoromski of IGN rated the episode with a 9 out of 10, an indication of an "amazing" episode. He observed that the episode's best scenes "show the impact of Jim and Pam being in different offices," and thought Andy's reactions made the audience appreciate Dwight more.

Steve West of CinemaBlend stated that "the balance between laughing at Michael’s ineptitude and the discomfit of Oscar was handled so deftly that it’s a wonder the show became successful when similarly great writing in Arrested Development did nothing to garner viewers." For his work on this episode, Greg Daniels won the Primetime Emmy Award for Outstanding Writing for a Comedy Series. Ken Kwapis also received a Primetime Emmy Award nomination for Outstanding Directing for a Comedy Series for his work on this episode as well, but lost to Ugly Betty's Richard Shepard for his work on the pilot episode.
