= Conflict Resolution (The Office) =

- The Office episode
- Episode no.: Season 2 Episode 21
- Directed by: Charles McDougall
- Written by: Greg Daniels
- Cinematography by: Randall Einhorn
- Editing by: David Rogers
- Production code: 2020
- Original air date: May 4, 2006
- Running time: 22 minutes

Guest appearance
- Scott Adsit as Photographer

Episode chronology
← Previous "Drug Testing"	Next → "Casino Night"
- The Office (American TV series) season 2

"Conflict Resolution" is the twenty-first and penultimate episode of the second season of the American comedy television series The Office the show's twenty-seventh episode overall. Written by executive producer and show runner Greg Daniels and directed by Charles McDougall, "Conflict Resolution" first aired in the United States on May 4, 2006, on NBC. The episode guest stars Scott Adsit, from Moral Orel and 30 Rock, as a photographer.

The series depicts the everyday lives of office employees in the Scranton, Pennsylvania branch of the fictional Dunder Mifflin Paper Company. In the episode, Michael Scott (Steve Carell) resolves a conflict between Oscar Martinez (Oscar Nunez) and Angela Martin (Angela Kinsey), and then discovers a file of other unresolved complaints between staff members and he determines to resolve them. But Michael's attempts actually unearth old tensions and create new ones between the office employees. Meanwhile, an unkind comment from Dwight Schrute (Rainn Wilson) about being transferred causes Jim Halpert (John Krasinski) to seriously rethink his work situation.

"Conflict Resolution" features the return of a poster created for the earlier episode "Christmas Party". The ending of the installment bears a striking similarity to the ending of the 1981 action film Raiders of the Lost Ark. Receiving largely positive reviews, the episode received a 3.7 Nielsen rating and was watched by 7.4 million viewers.

== Plot ==
When Michael Scott hears Oscar Martinez complaining about Angela Martin's baby poster to Toby Flenderson, he intervenes and resolves the conflict by forcing Oscar to wear the poster like a t-shirt. Inspired, Michael wrestles the file outlining other unresolved office complaints from Toby, determined to resolve them all. Michael publicly reads all the outstanding complaints, even though they were supposed to be anonymous, which only serves to further increase office tensions. Pam Beesly is angered by a redacted complaint that she plans her wedding during office hours. She concludes that the complaint was filed by Angela, which particularly angers her as she is covering for Angela's secret relationship with Dwight Schrute.

When photos for identification badges are being taken in the break room, Jim Halpert makes Dwight's new ID 5x7 inches, labels Dwight as a security threat, and changes his middle name from Kurt to "Fart". Dwight becomes even more furious that his voluminous complaints against Jim have gone ignored, and tells Michael that either Jim gets fired or Dwight will quit. When Michael reads all of Jim's pranks on Dwight, Jim begins to regret how much time he has wasted at the office. Dwight taunts Jim with a notice of a Dunder Mifflin position in Stamford, saying that Jim should look into it. Michael surveys the angry, divided office and nods to a watching Toby, acknowledging his efforts were a disaster. He defuses Dwight's anger by saying he will make his decision but needs indeterminate time to do so, which placates Dwight.

As everyone prepares to leave, Michael pays the photographer to take a special group photo, but goes through a lot of money before he, albeit poorly, photoshops one himself. During the procedure, Jim admits to Pam that he had registered the complaint about her wedding planning, and Pam looks shocked. The next day, Jim secretly sees Vice President Jan Levinson for an interview about the position in Stamford.

== Production ==
"Conflict Resolution" was the fifth episode of the series written by Greg Daniels, who is also the executive producer and show runner for The Office. The episode was the third of the series directed by Charles McDougall; he had previously directed the earlier season two episodes "Christmas Party" and "Dwight's Speech". The episode features Angela and Oscar arguing over Angela's poster of two babies playing saxophones. Jenna Fischer said that "As a cast, the baby poster is one of our favorite props... Angela received the poster from her Secret Santa in the Christmas episode." Fischer went on to say that "I had to stand in between Angela and Oscar as they bicker about the poster while Michael tries to mediate the situation. The whole time, the cute jazz babies are staring at me from the poster. It was hilarious!"

The Season Two DVD contains a number of deleted scenes from this episode. Notable cut scenes include Dwight finding his desk encircled in police tape, Dwight annoying the photographer in various ways, Michael discussing conflict and conflict resolution and dedicating himself to resolving all the old cases "before Toby can kill or rape another person", Dwight giving Pam "Level Red" security clearance, Meredith and Kevin getting their pictures taken, and Dwight being hassled by building security.

== Cultural references ==
The ending of "Conflict Resolution" bears a striking similarity to the ending of the 1981 action film Raiders of the Lost Ark. In the film, the Ark of the Covenant is boarded up and hidden away in a secret government warehouse containing thousands of identical boxes. In "Conflict Resolution", Toby is seen taking the box of complaints and placing it in a warehouse containing hundreds of other identical paper boxes.

== Reception ==
"Conflict Resolution" originally aired on NBC in the United States on May 4, 2006. The episode received a 3.7/9 among 18- to 49-year-olds in the Nielsen ratings. This means that 3.7 percent of all people 18–49 viewed the episode, and nine percent of all people 18–49 watching television viewed the episode. "Conflict Resolution" was watched by 7.4 million viewers overall, and retained 93 percent of viewers 18–49 from its lead-in My Name Is Earl.

The episode received generally good reviews from critics. Terry Morrow of the Knoxville News Sentinel stated that "But better yet, this episode defines what The Office does best. It turns mundane work events – like having new security-badge photos taken – into insightful and witty character studies." Morrow also praised the acting in the episode, which he called "one of this show's finest moments." Michael Sciannamea of TV Squad stated that "After a so-so episode last week, this was one was a return to brilliance." Like Morrow, Sciannamea went on to praise the work of the cast, stating that "The interplay between the cast was top-notch, and even though I've complained much about Dwight's over-the-top behavior, it seemed to work quite well this time around, and actually had a purpose to the story." M. Giant of Television Without Pity awarded the episode a rare "A+". He called the scene wherein Michael reads aloud Dwight's complaints "my favorite sequence in The Office history, if not sitcom history."
