= Drug Testing (The Office) =

- The Office episode
- Episode no.: Season 2 Episode 20
- Directed by: Greg Daniels
- Written by: Jennifer Celotta
- Cinematography by: Randall Einhorn
- Editing by: David Rogers
- Production code: 2022
- Original air date: April 27, 2006
- Running time: 22 minutes

Episode chronology
← Previous "Michael's Birthday"	Next → "Conflict Resolution"
- The Office (American season 2)

"Drug Testing" is the twentieth episode of the second season of the American comedy television series The Office and the twenty-sixth episode overall. It was written by Jennifer Celotta and directed by Greg Daniels, who is also an executive producer, and the series' show runner. It first aired in the United States on April 27, 2006, on NBC. The episode guest stars Hugh Dane as Hank the security guard.

The series depicts the everyday lives of office employees in the Scranton, Pennsylvania branch of the fictional Dunder Mifflin Paper Company. In the episode, Dwight Schrute (Rainn Wilson) finds pieces of a joint in the parking lot, and begins an investigation to find the owner. Michael Scott (Steve Carell), worrying that he may not pass a drug test, pressures Dwight for a cup of clean urine to pass the drug test. Failing to find the culprit and guilty over providing the urine to Michael, Dwight resigns as a volunteer sheriff. Later, Michael assigns Dwight the title of "Honorary Security Adviser".

Several of the scenes were based on the actors' real-life talents, such as Krasinski's ability to impersonate people. The episode was also the final episode of the season to be filmed, though not the last to air. "Drug Testing" was watched by 7.8 million viewers and received mostly positive reviews from critics, although one review did criticize the plot for not quite coming together.

== Plot ==
Dwight Schrute finds a half-smoked joint in the parking lot of the Scranton, Pennsylvania branch of the Dunder Mifflin Paper Company, and investigates its source in his capacity as volunteer sheriff deputy. When Dwight sets up urine testing, Michael Scott worries that a "clove cigarette" he smoked at an Alicia Keys concert will show up. He conducts an anti-drug meeting for the office in an attempt to cast suspicion off himself and excuse himself from the drug test. When Dwight informs Michael that he is not exempt, he pressures Dwight for a cup of his "clean" urine, which he uses to pass the drug test. Deeming this a violation of his oath as sheriff deputy, Dwight turns in his badge. Michael feels guilty, so he makes Dwight an "Honorary Security Advisor" for Dunder Mifflin Scranton.

When Jim Halpert and Pam Beesly say the same thing simultaneously, Pam calls "jinx", meaning Jim cannot talk until he buys her a Coke. The vending machine is sold out, and Pam insists that by the rules Jim must remain silent. Jim holds up his end of the jinx, even when Pam torments him by encouraging Kelly to continue with a one-sided conversation with Jim. When Pam teasingly says to Jim "you can tell me anything", he gives her a yearning and solemn look, then looks down, leaving her speechless. Later, Pam buys Jim his Coke, which she urges him to buy from her so that he can talk to her again. She expresses how weird it was for them not to talk all day. They share a smile and grab a bite in the kitchen as they discuss what happened in the day.

In a talking head interview, Jim discusses Dwight's sacrifice for Michael. He concludes, "I just don't get it. What does he get out of that relationship?" A cut-away emphasizes his own relationship with Pam.

== Production ==
"Drug Testing" was written by Jennifer Celotta and directed by show runner and executive producer Greg Daniels. Jenna Fischer noted that the subplot featuring Jim unable to talk was important because "Pam and Jim can say a lot to one another without any words at all", a reference to the "27 seconds of silence" the two shared in the earlier episode "Booze Cruise". The idea of Pam jinxing Jim had been under consideration for a long time, and after it became apparent that Jim actor John Krasinski could do exceptional work with silence, the show's staff pushed it forward. Michael has a bandage around his finger in this episode because Steve Carell hurt his finger during the week and was unable to remove his wedding ring due to the swelling. Instead of cutting off his ring, the crew simply wrapped a bandage around it.

When Michael tells Pam to "write this down", Fischer's response to the camera was improvised. "I thought it was funny that I didn't have a pad of paper but Michael was telling me to take notes," she explained in her MySpace blog, "so I just looked to the camera and showed my lack of pen and paper." Dwight's voice-over about his father was actually an improvised talking head recorded for the pilot; it ended up not being used for that episode, but Daniels loved it and had been looking for a place to fit it into an episode ever since. Jim's impression of Stanley in this episode was inspired by Krasinski's actual talent of doing impressions on the set.

This was the final episode of the season to be filmed, though not the last to air. According to Jenna Fischer, everybody on the set was excited in a manner that she likened to students on the last day of school. The giddiness particularly shows in Fischer's performance: Pam skips after Jim into the break room, she bounces on her toes at the end of the "fake crying" talking head, and she taps the soda can three times to get Jim to release the jinx.

A scene in which Dwight turns in his uniform and badge at the sheriff's office was filmed but cut because the producers realized it was unnecessary and it seemed implausible that the documentary crew could enter a sheriff's office without being challenged. The Season Two DVD contains a number of deleted scenes from this episode. Notable cut scenes include Jim doing impressions of Kevin, Dwight, and Angela for Pam, Dwight saying he is so determined to find the culprit that he is prepared to pray "to Thor himself", Toby saying that Michael should take drugs, Dwight talking about how dismal Jim's present life is, Pam toying with Dwight by admitting that she "was a teensy bit high... in the parking lot at the Quick and Easy", Meredith coming to Jim because Pam told her he had something to tell her, Kelly speaking to a customer she left on hold during the conference, Dwight taking notes during the conference, Pam showing the camera the flyer that Michael made up for the conference, and Lee and Gino, the workers at Vance Refrigeration, discarding a joint in the parking lot.

== Cultural references ==
Michael notes that he had gotten high at an Alicia Keys concert. During Michael's anti-drug meeting, he misidentifies hookah as an illegal drug; Toby points out the fact that it is merely a pipe. Dwight notes that he'll have to bring in his bō staff, a long staff weapon used in Okinawa and feudal Japan, to protect the office. Jim later notes that Dwight was dressed like a member of the disco group the Village People.

== Reception ==
"Drug Testing" originally aired on NBC in the United States on April 26, 2006. "Drug Testing" received 3.9/10 in the ages 18–49 demographic in the Nielsen ratings. This means that 3.9 percent of all households with an 18- to 49-year-old living in it watched the episode, and ten percent had their television tuned to the channel at any point. "Drug Testing" was watched by 7.8 million viewers.

"Drug Testing" was generally well received by critics. Lindsey Thomas of Rolling Stone named Dwight interrogating the workers in the Office after finding the joint in the parking lot number fifteen of the top twenty-five moments from the show. Alan Sepinwall of The Seattle Times wrote that "Drug Testing" allowed the show to finally make "The Leap." Brendan Babish of DVD Verdict was pleased with the entry and awarded it an "A−". He was pleased with the episode's emphasis on Dwight and called it "a far better showcase for Dwight's many charms than 'Dwight's Speech'." M. Giant of Television Without Pity awarded the episode an "A". Michael Sciannamea of AOL TV was more critical of the episode and wrote that he "didn't think this episode was so hot", calling the premise "a good idea that didn't really take off". He also disliked Jim and Pam's subplot and called it "rather childish" and wrote that it "didn't seem to go anywhere".
