= Dwight's Speech =

- The Office episode
- Episode no.: Season 2 Episode 17
- Directed by: Charles McDougall
- Written by: Paul Lieberstein
- Cinematography by: Randall Einhorn
- Editing by: Dean Holland
- Production code: 2017
- Original air date: March 2, 2006
- Running time: 22 minutes

Episode chronology
← Previous "Valentine's Day"	Next → "Take Your Daughter to Work Day"
- The Office (American season 2)

"Dwight's Speech" is the seventeenth episode of the second season of the American comedy television series The Office and the show's twenty-third episode overall. Written by Paul Lieberstein and directed by Charles McDougall, the episode first aired in the United States on March 2, 2006 on NBC.

The series depicts the everyday lives of office employees in the Scranton, Pennsylvania branch of the fictional Dunder Mifflin Paper Company. In the episode, Michael Scott (Steve Carell) helps Dwight Schrute (Rainn Wilson) with an important speech that he is going to give. Meanwhile, Jim Halpert (John Krasinski) plans a vacation to avoid Pam Beesly's (Jenna Fischer) wedding.

The speech scene employed over 500 extras, an unusual occurrence for the series. Much of Dwight's speech is based upon real speeches by Italian fascist dictator Benito Mussolini. The episode received largely positive reviews from television critics. In its original broadcast, "Dwight's Speech" earned a Nielsen rating of 4.4 in the 18–49 demographic, being viewed by 8.4 million viewers.

== Plot ==
Dwight Schrute is named Northeastern Pennsylvania Salesman of the Year and must make a speech at an association meeting at the Radisson Lackawanna Station Hotel, getting some assistance from Michael Scott. Before he leaves, Jim Halpert gives Dwight tips on how to give public speeches. Unknown to Dwight, Jim's tips are taken from speeches by various dictators, such as Italian fascist leader Benito Mussolini. When Michael and Dwight make it to the convention, Dwight gets cold feet. Michael goes up and tries to relive his glory days of winning Salesman of the Year two years in a row, but ends up embarrassing himself on the stage. Dwight finally works up the nerve to give his speech and, by using Jim's advice, wins over the crowd with a passionate yet unorthodox speech. Michael ends up leaving the convention room and later entertains Dwight with his tales at the bar.

Meanwhile, back in the office, Pam Beesly begins to write invitations for her approaching wedding with help from Ryan Howard and Kelly Kapoor. Kelly talks about her dreams of getting married someday and is hurt when Ryan responds to her flirtatious question about wedding dates by saying he does not think he will ever marry. When Kelly leaves the room, Pam advises Ryan to be considerate of Kelly's feelings, but Ryan curtly notes "I know what I said." Aggrieved at Pam's continuous working on wedding plans at the office, Jim makes plans for a vacation but struggles to come up with a destination. The other employees subtly duel over the thermostat. Jim tells Pam that he will be going to Australia and will be missing her wedding as a result.

== Production ==
"Dwight's Speech" was directed by Charles McDougall, making it his second directing credit after the earlier second season episode "Christmas Party". "Dwight's Speech" was written by Paul Lieberstein, who plays human resources director Toby Flenderson. Lieberstein later revealed that Jim never went on his trip to Australia, noting "The whole Pam thing took him by surprise, he transferred and then wasn’t really up for vacation. Unless, of course, we find a good joke in his vacation."

During the earlier scenes when Dwight is in Michael's office, Pam can be seen in the background talking to Meredith. According to actress Jenna Fischer, she and Kate Flannery stayed in character and acted out mundane talking scenes. Although they were not recorded, the dialogue was very detailed. In a guest post written for TV Guide, Fischer described several of the conversations, which ranged from Pam and Meredith discussing "the problems with the new quality-assurance computer-input program", that the computers don't "accept both alpha and numeric characters", "backlog [of] receipts dating to 2001", and that Dunder Mifflin "changed to all-numeric product codes in 2004 and the computer system does not allow for the earlier records."

The speech scene employed over 500 extras, which was unusual for The Office, and was hectic for the crew to organize.

The Season Two DVD contains a number of deleted scenes from this episode. Notable cut scenes include Dwight coming to work wearing sunglasses, Michael criticizing Dwight's speaking skills, Dwight trying to tell another joke to the office, Ryan bringing the wrong type of stamps for Pam's wedding invitations, and an extended scene of Michael's unfunny and very awkward speech.

== Cultural references ==
In order to practice his public speaking skills, Dwight tries to convince the office that Brad Pitt was in a car accident. Kelly Kapoor (Mindy Kaling) then states that it "is karma because of what he did to Jennifer Aniston." During the meeting in the break room Dwight references Good Morning, Vietnam. Michael later references the movie at the actual convention when he is filling time for Dwight. When Jim asks the office where he should go for vacation, Kevin tells him he should go to Hedonism Resorts, describing it as "Club Med, only everything is naked." Toby tells him he should go to Amsterdam, while Creed informs him that he should go to Hong Kong. Dwight later reveals that, given the chance, he would go to New Zealand to "walk the Lord of the Rings trail to Mordor and I will hike Mount Doom." Much of Dwight's speech is drawn from a variety of sources, including the following:

Excerpts from Dwight's speech	Source Quote	Source
"Blood alone moves the wheels of history!"	"It is blood which moves the wheels of history!"	Paraphrased from a speech Mussolini gave in Parma on December 13, 1914, advocating Italian entry into World War I.
"Have you ever asked yourselves in an hour of meditation, which everyone finds during the day, how long... we've been at war—the war of work.	"Have you ever asked yourselves in an hour of meditation, which everyone finds during the day, how long we have been at war?"	Taken from a speech Mussolini gave on February 23, 1941.
"I say to you, and you will understand, that it is a privilege to fight!"	"I say to you, and you will understand, that it is a privilege to fight with them."	Taken from Mussolini's speech about the Italian declaration of war on the United States on 11 December 1941.
"We are warriors! Salesmen of north-eastern Pennsylvania, I ask you once more: Rise and be worthy of this historical hour!"	"Italians! Once more arise and be worthy of this historical hour!"	Taken from Mussolini's speech about the Italian declaration of war on the United States on 11 December 1941.
"No revolution is worth anything unless it can defend itself!"	"No revolution is worth anything unless it can defend itself."	Taken from a speech given by Vladimir Lenin to the All-Russian Central Executive Committee in 1918.
"I say salesmen—and women—of the world, unite!"	"Working men of all countries, unite!"	Taken from the final chapter of the Communist Manifesto (1848) by Karl Marx and Friedrich Engels.
"We shall never acquiesce"	"We shall never surrender"	Taken from the We shall fight on the beaches speech (1940) by Winston Churchill

== Reception ==
"Dwight's Speech" originally aired on NBC on March 2, 2006. The episode received a 4.4 rating/10 percent share among adults between the ages of 18 and 49. This means that it was seen by 4.4 percent of all 18- to 49-year-olds, and 10 percent of all 18- to 49-year-olds watching television at the time of the broadcast. The episode was viewed by 8.4 million viewers, and retained 88 percent of its lead-in My Name Is Earl audience. An encore presentation of the episode on August 15 received a 1.9 rating/6 percent share and was viewed by over 4.6 million viewers and retained 100 percent of its lead-in audience.

"Dwight's Speech" received mostly positive reviews. Michael Sciannamea of TV Squad wrote that he wonders if the Jim-Pam relationship "will reach some sort of resolution or become a season-ending cliffhanger". Sciannamea also noted that "you know you're living in a Bizarro World when Dwight wins Dunder Mifflin's salesman of the year award." M. Giant of Television Without Pity graded the episode with an "A–." Francis Rizzo III of DVD Talk felt that Dwight's enlarged role was great, but noted that the episode was not as funny as his "strange behavior" in "The Injury." Betsy Bozdech of DVD Journal described "Dwight's Speech" as an instant classic. Not all reviews were so glowing. Brendan Babish of DVD Verdict felt that "Dwight's Speech" was "one of the few misfires" of the season, noting that it "certainly has laughs", but that "its humor is a bit too absurd compared to the show's usual riffs on office ennui". He ultimately gave the episode a "B−", but wrote that "Dwight's Speech" being the worst episode of the season was a "testament to the show's excellence."

IGN ranked the scene with Dwight making his speech as its third-best moment in the first two seasons, and called Wilson's performance a "hilariously spot-on impersonation of Mussolini's crazed arm movements." In addition, Rolling Stone named the same scene the eighteenth-funniest scene in the first three seasons of The Office.
