= Michael's Birthday =

- The Office episode
- Episode no.: Season 2 Episode 19
- Directed by: Ken Whittingham
- Written by: Gene Stupnitsky; Lee Eisenberg
- Cinematography by: Randall Einhorn
- Editing by: Dean Holland
- Production code: 2019
- Original air date: March 30, 2006
- Running time: 22 minutes

Guest appearance
- Nancy Carell as Carol Stills

Episode chronology
← Previous "Take Your Daughter to Work Day"	Next → "Drug Testing"
- The Office (American season 2)

"Michael's Birthday" is the nineteenth episode of the second season of the American comedy television series The Office and the show's twenty-fifth episode overall. Written by Gene Stupnitsky and Lee Eisenberg, and directed by Ken Whittingham, the episode first aired in the United States on March 30, 2006, on NBC. The episode guest stars Nancy Carell as Carol Stills.

The series depicts the everyday lives of office employees in the Scranton, Pennsylvania branch of the fictional Dunder Mifflin Paper Company. In the episode, Michael Scott (Steve Carell) is disappointed when only Dwight Schrute (Rainn Wilson) celebrates his birthday. Meanwhile, Kevin Malone (Brian Baumgartner) spends the day waiting to find out if he has skin cancer.

The ice skating scenes were shot in an actual rink; Carell's talent at hockey was the reason the writers decided to set the episode there. Fischer had also learned to skate in preparation for the movie Blades of Glory, but the writers decided that there was no reason for Pam to be a good skater, so they had Pam lean on Jim. "Michael's Birthday" was watched by 7.8 million viewers and received mostly positive reviews from critics.

== Plot ==
Michael Scott is excited to be celebrating his birthday, and tries to get the employees excited with him. Dwight Schrute is the only one to join in; the rest of the employees are more concerned about Kevin Malone, who is awaiting results from his skin cancer screening. Pam Beesly and Jim Halpert sneak out to buy gifts for Kevin to cheer him up. After goofing around at the store, Jim and Pam return to the office.

When Michael finds out about Kevin's predicament, he gives Kevin his condolences, but is bitter that his birthday fun is ruined. Dwight and Angela Martin are less subtle than they think they are being when discussing their secret relationship within earshot of Ryan Howard.

In an attempt to make Kevin feel better and celebrate his birthday, Michael takes the employees out ice skating. At the rink, he runs into his real estate agent Carol Stills and her children. He entertains them, which makes Carol smile. Kevin gets the word that his screening results are negative, to the relief of everyone except Michael, who believes that negative means he has cancer, and reacts for the first time with genuine concern and compassion for Kevin. Gifts are passed out to Kevin and Michael. Pam says in an interview that Michael's birthday "was a good day", and appears to struggle to come up with an explanation for why it was good. The documentary crew suggestively intercuts this with footage of her shopping with Jim.

== Production ==
This episode was the second episode of the series directed by Ken Whittingham. Whittingham had previously directed the first season episode "Health Care". "Michael's Birthday" was written by Gene Stupnitsky and Lee Eisenberg. The two had previously written the episodes "The Fight" and "The Secret".

The ice skating scenes were shot in an actual rink. According to Jenna Fischer, Steve Carell used to play hockey, and the writers had been looking for a reason to use Carell's ice skating skills in an episode. Fischer had also learned to skate in preparation for the movie Blades of Glory, but the writers decided that there was no reason for Pam to be a good skater, so they had Pam lean on Jim. Saturday Night Live alumna Nancy Carell, who played Carol Stills, is actually Steve Carell's wife. At the rink, Michael tells Pam to be wary of breast cancer. This is the third joke that Stupnitsky and Eisenberg had aimed at Pam's breasts, after one each in "The Fight" and "The Secret". Fischer later jokingly said that "my breasts play a central role in one of tonight's scenes." Fischer also noted that, due to the slight emphasis her breasts were receiving, many fans on the internet were arguing that Fischer had breast implants. Fischer denied the rumors, but stated that she was "flattered".

The Season Two DVD contains a number of deleted scenes from this episode. Notable cut scenes include Dwight explaining his duties on Michael's birthday, Ryan helping Michael attach balloons to his chair, and Ryan presenting his research on skin cancer.

== Cultural references ==
The cold opening features Michael trying to get various members of the office involved in a pyramid scheme, which is a non-sustainable business model that involves promising participants payment or services, primarily for enrolling other people into the scheme, rather than supplying any real investment or sale of products or services to the public. The scheme is generally considered one of various internet scams.

Michael notes that he shares his birthday with Eva Longoria, and that it will be a perfect icebreaker if he ever meets Teri Hatcher. After Michael asks what Dwight is playing on the recorder, Dwight replies that it is "For The Longest Time", by "William Joel" (Billy Joel released "The Longest Time" in 1984). When Kevin mentions he might have skin cancer, Kelly starts discussing a case involving cancer on the popular medical drama Grey's Anatomy. She later says that the saddest funeral she ever saw was the one for Princess Diana. For Michael's birthday, his mother sent him a picture of James Dean. Resignedly, Michael notes that "I bet Luke Perry's friends don't treat him like this". While at the drug store, Jim and Pam buy a copy of the American comedy movie American Pie 2. Pam later impersonates Darth Vader, a character from the science fiction movie franchise Star Wars, on the store's intercom. To show his support for Kevin, Michael makes a fake Livestrong wristband out of yellow Post-it notes. Dwight later gives Michael a Wilkes-Barre/Scranton Penguins jersey with the words "From Dwight" on the back.

== Reception ==
"Michael's Birthday" originally aired on NBC in the United States on March 30, 2006. "Michael's Birthday" received 4.0/10 in the ages 18–49 demographic in the Nielsen ratings. This means that 4.0 percent of all households with an 18- to 49-year-old living in it watched the episode, and ten percent had their television tuned to the channel at any point. "Michael's Birthday" was watched by 7.8 million viewers.

"Michael's Birthday" received very positive reviews. Michael Sciannamea of TV Squad wrote that the episode was "simply the best one yet", and that it "was so brilliant and so right on that I can't give it any higher praise". Sciannamea went on to write that "the scenes at the ice rink were hysterical" and The Office "is the best sitcom on TV". M. Giant of Television Without Pity graded the episode with an "A". Lindsey Thomas of Rolling Stone magazine named the scene wherein Michael confuses the term "negative" to mean that Kevin has skin cancer as the seventeenth greatest moment in the series. Brendan Babish of DVD Verdict was moderately pleased with the entry and awarded it a "B+". He called the entry a "good episode", but noted that it was helped by "great supporting work from Dwight", who he called "as not only the best supporting character on the show, but perhaps the best in television."
