= The Fire (The Office) =

- The Office episode
- Episode no.: Season 2 Episode 4
- Directed by: Ken Kwapis
- Written by: B. J. Novak
- Cinematography by: Randall Einhorn
- Editing by: David Rogers
- Production code: 2001
- Original air date: October 11, 2005
- Running time: 22 minutes

Guest appearances
- David Denman as Roy Anderson; Amy Adams as Katy Moore; Leslie David Baker as Stanley Hudson; Brian Baumgartner as Kevin Malone; Kate Flannery as Meredith Palmer; Mindy Kaling as Kelly Kapoor; Angela Kinsey as Angela Martin; Paul Lieberstein as Toby Flenderson; Oscar Nunez as Oscar Martinez; Phyllis Smith as Phyllis Lapin

Episode chronology
← Previous "Office Olympics"	Next → "Halloween"
- The Office (American season 2)

"The Fire" is the fourth episode of the second season of the American comedy television series The Office and the show's tenth episode overall. Written by B. J. Novak and directed by Ken Kwapis, the episode first aired in the United States on October 11, 2005, on NBC. The episode features Amy Adams as Jim's girlfriend, Katy.

The series depicts the everyday lives of office employees in the Scranton, Pennsylvania branch of the fictional Dunder Mifflin Paper Company. In the episode, Michael Scott (Steve Carell) takes it upon himself to teach Ryan Howard (B. J. Novak) about business, and the office is evacuated due to a fire. While outside, Michael continues to show an interest in Ryan, causing Dwight Schrute (Rainn Wilson) to be jealous. Meanwhile, Jim Halpert (John Krasinski) organizes games to play outside.

According to B. J. Novak, the episode was "a fun one to film". "The Fire" was filmed in 100 °F (38 °C) weather, but the actors had to pretend to shiver. The firemen were played by actual firemen, and their costumes were designed in order to look like authentic Scranton firefighters.

== Plot ==
Jim Halpert's girlfriend Katy Moore starts calling him at the office, annoying Pam Beesly since she has to forward the calls. Michael Scott gives Ryan Howard a glowing checkpoint review, and Dwight Schrute bitterly remarks that he has not been evaluated in years. When Ryan voices interest in starting his own business someday, Michael takes it upon himself to teach Ryan the "ten rules of business". The fire alarm sounds, and while Dwight and Angela Martin both attempt to take charge of the evacuation, Michael pushes others out of the way in his escape from the building.

Outside, Dwight tries to insert himself into Michael's rapport with Ryan by dubbing the three of them "The Three Musketeers", but this only succeeds in stirring Ryan's fear of getting an office nickname. The employees play spoken games to pass the time, including "Desert Island Picks" and "Who Would You Do?". When Ryan reveals that he is attending business school at night, Michael becomes enamored of his newfound protégé. Dwight's jealousy of Ryan's favor with Michael increases, and he sulks in his car. When Michael mentions that he left his cell phone in the office, Dwight rushes back into the building to fetch it. Michael has Ryan call his cell phone to help Dwight find it, alerting them that it is in Michael's pocket. Dwight emerges, coughing, from the building and reveals the fire was started by Ryan, who left a cheese pita in the toaster-oven set to "oven" instead of "toaster". Dwight and Michael mock Ryan and dub him "The Fire Guy".

== Production ==
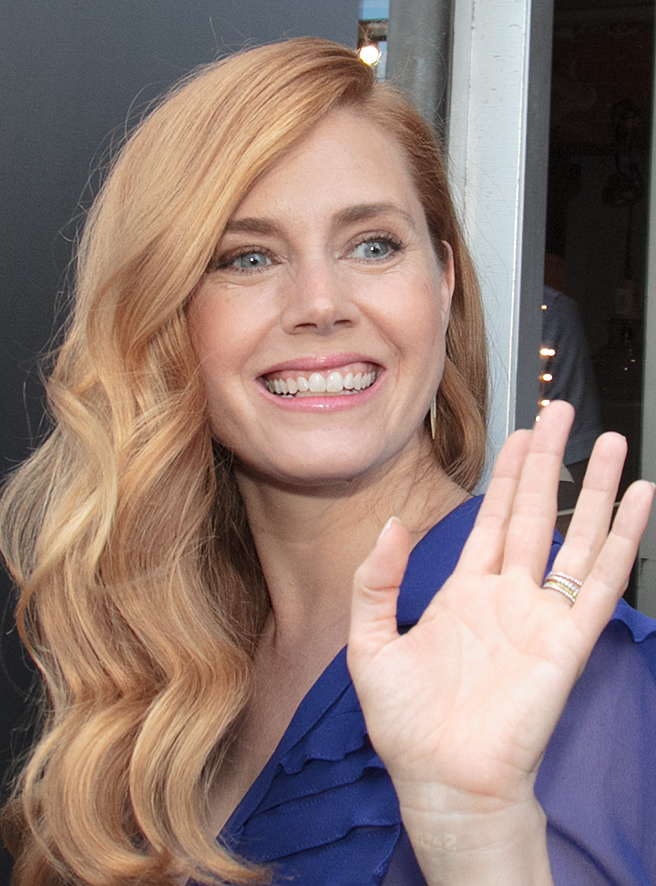
Amy Adams guest starred in the episode, playing Katy.

"The Fire" was the fourth episode of the series directed by Ken Kwapis. Kwapis had previously directed "Pilot", "Diversity Day", and "Sexual Harassment". "The Fire" was written by B. J. Novak, who also acts on the show as Ryan Howard. Novak had previously penned the episodes "Diversity Day" and "Sexual Harassment". "The Fire" featured the second appearance of Katy, portrayed by Amy Adams. Adams thoroughly enjoyed her work on the show. In an interview with Advocate.com, she said, "[The Office] was the best work experience. I loved that show and that cast so much. I don't know if they believe me, but every time I see them I'm like, 'Oh my gosh, I'll do anything to come back.'"

Novak described the episode as "a fun one to film". The episode was filmed in 100 °F (38 °C) weather, but according to cast member B. J. Novak, they "couldn't look hot". The area outside the building was shot in Van Nuys, California in what Novak called a "bad area": he later noted that they "had to pretend we weren't scared, even though every car that is left next to our set overnight is stripped to the bone for parts." Greg Daniels noted that during the filming of "The Fire", the cast and crew kept being interrupted by the sound of helicopters. The firemen in the scene were played by actual firemen. The crew of The Office had someone in Scranton take photographs of local firefighters' uniforms, so the costumes would be accurate. However, in an interview with the Pittsburgh Post-Gazette, Scranton firefighter Art Franklin pointed out that the uniform is actually tan, instead of the black ones seen on the show.

== Cultural references ==
When lecturing Ryan, Michael compares himself to Yoda and Mr. Miyagi. When he later attempts to do a Yoda voice, Ryan misinterprets it as an impression of Fozzie Bear (both characters are voiced by Frank Oz). When Dwight is dejectedly listening to music in his car, he is playing "Everybody Hurts" by R.E.M. Dwight and Michael sing a parody of the Billy Joel song "We Didn't Start the Fire".

During the game of desert island, the employees reference specific movies and books. Angela says she would take The Bible, A Purpose Driven Life, and The Da Vinci Code, but only to burn the last one. Dwight says that he would take the Physicians' Desk Reference, but hollow it out and fill it with supplies; he also states he would bring Harry Potter and the Sorcerer's Stone or Harry Potter and the Prisoner of Azkaban in case he got bored. Meredith says that she would bring Legends of the Fall, My Big Fat Greek Wedding, Legally Blonde, The Bridges of Madison County, and "just the pottery scene" from Ghost to watch. Pam picks Fargo, Edward Scissorhands, Dazed and Confused, The Breakfast Club, and The Princess Bride. After asking what Dwight would bring, Jim says The Crow.

== Reception ==
"The Fire" originally aired on NBC in the United States on October 11, 2005. The episode was viewed by 7.6 million viewers and received a 3.7 rating/9% share among adults between the ages of 18 and 49. This means that it was seen by 3.7% of all 18- to 49-year-olds, and 9% of all 18- to 49-year-olds watching television at the time of the broadcast. The episode won its timeslot. An encore presentation of the episode, on June 6, 2006, received 1.9 rating/6% share and was viewed by over 4.6 million viewers.

"The Fire" received mostly positive reviews from critics. TV Squad's Michael Sciannamea wrote that "The Fire" was "another good episode". Sciannamea went on to write that "show has definitely improved and it's nice to see the other characters emerge". "Miss Alli" of Television Without Pity graded the episode with a "B+". Dwight's reinterpretation of "We Didn't Start the Fire" inspired fans of The Office to make their own song parodies. One version, "Ryan Started the Fire", lists several events from The Office. After posting the song, Margaret Lyons from Entertainment Weekly wrote, "Yay for the Internet!"

Erik Adams of The A.V. Club awarded the episode an "A−", saying that "'The Fire' is not the second season's funniest half-hour, but I love it for its simplicity." Writing that the episode bore similarities to a bottle episode, he enjoyed the way that the conversations among the employees allowed the audience to more fully understand all of the individual characters. Adams also praised the interaction between Carell and Novak, as well as the performance of Wilson, which he called "unsettling".
