= Kevin Malone =

Fictional character of American TV series/mockumentary The Office

- The Office character
- First appearance: "Pilot" (2005)
- Last appearance: "Finale" (2013)
- Created by: Greg Daniels; Ricky Gervais; Stephen Merchant
- Based on: Keith Bishop (British counterpart)
- Portrayed by: Brian Baumgartner

In-universe information
- Occupation: Accountant, Dunder Mifflin, Scranton
- Origin: Scranton, Pennsylvania, United States

Kevin Malone is a fictional character in the American television series The Office, portrayed by Brian Baumgartner. In the series, Kevin is a member of the accounting department at the Scranton branch of Dunder Mifflin. He is shown to have eccentric interests and a lack of communication skills.

In the original UK TV series, Kevin's counterpart is Keith Bishop, who is portrayed by Ewen MacIntosh.

== Storylines ==
=== Seasons 1–2 ===
Kevin is a prominent supporting character throughout the first season.

In season two, Kevin begins a relationship with Stacy, to whom he later proposes. In "Take Your Daughter to Work Day," Kevin brings Stacy's daughter Abby to the office, where she quickly becomes friends with Jim.

In "Michael's Birthday," Kevin gets tested for skin cancer, which takes the attention away from party festivities to Michael's dismay. The test results are negative, though Michael mistakenly believes "negative" means that his test revealed cancer.

Later in the season, Jim and Pam encounter Kevin's The Police tribute band "Scrantonicity" while searching for bands for Pam and Roy's wedding.

In "Casino Night," Kevin is revealed as an adept poker player and 2002 winner of a World Series of Poker tournament.

=== Seasons 3–4 ===
In "Cocktails," Kevin is asked if he and Stacy have set a date for their wedding. Kevin says they have, but it is complicated, hinting that they may have separated.

Kevin suffers a series of setbacks during the third season. In the episode "Money," Kevin announces that he has split from the band "Scrantonicity" and formed "Scrantonicity II" instead. To Kevin's dismay, none of his coworkers came to support his new band.

In "The Chair Model," Kevin is angered when the Dunder Mifflin employees are forced to park in a satellite parking lot, and works with Andy to reclaim their parking spaces. Though Michael denies him the opportunity to call a meeting, Kevin and Andy decide to call a meeting with the bosses of the office park, and they are given the parking spaces back. Kevin is cheered up by the news, revealing that he's had a hard time because Stacy broke off their engagement.

In "Goodbye, Toby," Dwight pranks the office's new HR representative Holly Flax by telling her that Kevin is mentally challenged, and that he got his job at Dunder Mifflin through a special program. Holly pays special attention to Kevin, praising him for doing simple tasks. On the other hand, Kevin interprets Holly's frequent praise as flirting.

=== Seasons 5–6 ===
At the beginning of the season, Holly still believes Kevin is mentally challenged. When Angela berates Kevin over a mistake he made, Holly steps in; Kevin reveals he is not mentally challenged, which embarrasses Holly.

In "Blood Drive," Kevin meets a woman named Lynn, but is awkward when talking to her. Andy, Jim, and Pam give him advice on wooing her in "Golden Ticket," and ultimately, he successfully asks her to dinner and a movie. They are later seen kissing in Michael's "Cafe Disco." In a deleted scene, Kevin reveals that he and Lynn had broken up.

In "Casual Friday," Kevin brings a batch of his homemade chili upstairs to the office, only to drop the pot, causing chili to spill all over the floor in front of Erin's desk. He desperately tries to clean up the mess, only to drench papers and binders in chili while spreading it across the carpet.

In "Scott's Tots," Michael tells Erin Hannon that Kevin had originally applied for a position in the warehouse. However, Michael decided to hire him as an accountant instead because he "had a feeling about him."

In "The Delivery," Michael attempts to set Kevin up with the new receptionist Erin, telling Kevin that she is interested in him. When Erin tells Michael that she likes Andy, not Kevin, Michael rudely tells Kevin that he is not good enough to date Erin, infuriating and confusing Kevin. Kevin reveals that he is a gourmand who has "cooked his way through Julia Child's cookbook."

In "Secretary's Day," the office staff are amused by a video Oscar creates that compares Kevin's voice to Cookie Monster's. Kevin reports the video to Gabe, but the office ignores Gabe's attempts to stop the mockery. Ultimately, Kevin ends up impersonating Gabe. At the end of the episode, Kevin makes a video of Oscar as The Count, which only Michael finds funny.

=== Seasons 7–9 ===
Following the holiday break, Kevin writes on Pam's "New Year's Resolution Board" for him to eat more vegetables. Later, Michael is upset that Holly did not stick to her ultimatum with A.J. and projects his anger onto the rest of the office for not sticking to their resolutions; he forces Kevin to eat a stalk of broccoli. Michael later apologizes to Kevin, and Kevin readily forgives him.

In "Todd Packer," Kevin is excited when he learns Todd Packer will be working at the office full-time, but upon his arrival at the office, Todd insults him. Visibly hurt, Michael later calls Kevin to the front of the office so Packer can apologize to him, though Packer's apology is insincere.

In "Goodbye, Michael," Michael's initial going-away present to Kevin is a caricature of Kevin as a pig sloppily eating a pizza. Michael rips it up, telling Kevin that he will eventually be thin and find love. Kevin informs Michael that he's okay with who he is.

In "Trivia," Kevin tries to join the "A-team" for the trivia contest, which includes Andy, Jim, Darryl, and Ryan, only to be gently steered away from that group and into the "Hail Mary" team with Kelly, Erin, and Meredith. To the shock of Andy and all the other teams, the Hail Mary team and Kevin in particular prove to be excellent at trivia questions and win the $1,000 prize. Kevin speaks with pride about the achievement. However, in the episode's closing scenes, Kevin and the rest of his team try to win a higher-stakes trivia contest and fail.

While Kevin is generally portrayed as a simple-minded and unsophisticated person, he is shown to exhibit remarkable astuteness, being one of the few staff members to notice Andy is suffering from a mental breakdown following his abrupt dismissal from Dunder Mifflin. Towards the end of the season, Kevin is revealed to have adopted an old and feeble dog named Ruby.

In "The Boat," Kevin overhears Oscar talking about kissing Angela's husband, Robert. When Oscar sees that Kevin heard, he goes to great lengths to ensure that Kevin keeps the secret. Later, in "Vandalism," Kevin and Oscar attend Angela's son's birthday party, where Kevin confronts Robert and accuses him of using Oscar and Angela to boost his political campaign.

In the series finale, Dwight mentions that he had fired Kevin shortly after the airing of the documentary; a later interview reveals that Kevin had been cooking the books at Dunder Mifflin for the duration of the series, using the invented number "Keleven" to correct his accounting errors.

During Dwight's bachelor party, Jim takes all the current and past men from the office to a bar, where it is revealed that Kevin is the owner. When Kevin refuses them service and tells them to leave, Dwight tells Kevin that he was only fired because of his constant mistakes, and that he misses him and still considers him a friend. Kevin forgives Dwight and tells him that he misses him too. He is later seen attending Dwight and Angela's wedding.

== Webisodes ==
=== The Accountants ===
Between the second and third seasons, NBC created and uploaded The Accountants, a season of "webisodes" (online mini episodes) with Kevin, Oscar, and Angela attempting to solve an accounting error. The error ends up being the fault of Angela and when it is discovered, Kevin says it is the best day of his life.

=== Kevin's Loan ===
In the summer between the fourth and fifth seasons, NBC's website featured a new season of webisodes entitled Kevin's Loan. The four online episodes detailed Kevin's attempts to find money in order to pay his gambling debt back to his bookmaker. Kevin settles on trying to get a small business loan under the auspices of selling ice cream. When his first attempt goes poorly, Darryl joins Kevin in making the proposal to another loan officer at the same bank, and they bring a sample into the meeting. Darryl flirts with the female loan officer and asks her to taste the ice cream. When she does, she remarks that it tastes like Breyers. The first loan officer comes in and Darryl asks him to taste the ice cream. The loan officer asks if they made the ice cream or bought it in a store, and Kevin throws a nervous fit, hissing at Darryl to abort their mission. The webisode season ends with Kevin selling ice cream outside the office to pay back his debt. Stanley comes out to buy some but refuses to pay the ten-dollar cost. Kevin is seen with a smile turn to a frown.

== Reception ==
Kevin became a fan favorite due to his eccentric personality, though Screen Rant noted several inconsistencies with his character. The spilled chili scene became one of the most seen moments on the show, with actor Brian Baumgartner paying homage to the scene in a real-life commercial for Bush's Baked Beans aired on National Chili Day. Baumgartner, along with several Office cast mates, appeared in Scranton, PA to meet fans for the show's "Wrap Party" which took place in May 2013, and has made several appearances in the "Electric City" where the show is set.
