= Kelly Kapoor =

Fictional character from NBC's The Office

- First appearance: "Diversity Day" (2005)
- Last appearance: "Finale" (2013)
- Created by: Greg Daniels; B. J. Novak
- Portrayed by: Mindy Kaling

In-universe information
- Occupation: Customer service representative, Dunder Mifflin; Minority executive, Dunder Mifflin Sabre
- Family: Rupa Kapoor (sister); Nipa Kapoor (sister); Tiffany Kapoor (sister)
- Significant others: Ryan Howard (boyfriend); Darryl Philbin (ex-boyfriend); Ravi (boyfriend)
- Religion: Hinduism
- Nationality: Indian-American

Kelly Rajanigandha Kapoor is a fictional character from the American television series The Office, portrayed by Mindy Kaling. She is the customer service representative at the Scranton branch of Dunder Mifflin from seasons 1 to 8. Following Kaling's departure from the show, Kelly leaves the Scranton branch at the beginning of the ninth season to get married and move to Ohio.

== Storylines ==
=== Seasons 1–2 ===
Kelly is first featured in the episode "Diversity Day", where Michael conducts a diversity training seminar. Michael attempts to demonstrate how to play his diversity game by speaking to Kelly, who has just entered the room, in a stereotypical Indian accent. Offended, Kelly slaps Michael and leaves the conference room.

In the second season, Kelly gets involved in a wildly uneven relationship with Ryan Howard, the office temp. Ryan expresses his regret that their first kiss occurred the day before Valentine's Day. In the episode "Take Your Daughter To Work Day", Kelly witnesses Stanley's teenage daughter, Melissa, hitting on Ryan, and tells Stanley about the situation. Stanley berates Ryan. In the season finale "Casino Night", Ryan wearily admits to Jim that he is still dating Kelly.

=== Seasons 3–4 ===
Kelly and Ryan's relationship continues throughout the third season, though at the Hindu Diwali festival, Kelly's parents criticize Ryan for not making enough money and not being committed to marriage and family, and try to set her up with an Indian doctor. In "Business School", Michael moves Ryan's desk next to Kelly's. Kelly is excited by the move, and she and Ryan bicker and passionately make up frequently. In "Product Recall", Kelly trains Oscar, Angela, and Kevin to take customer service phone calls after an obscene watermark is printed on Dunder Mifflin paper, prompting too many complaint calls for Kelly alone to answer.

In "The Job", Ryan abruptly ends his relationship with Kelly after receiving a promotion to the corporate headquarters. In "Dunder Mifflin Infinity", Kelly attempts to win Ryan back by telling him she is pregnant with his child. Kelly is overjoyed when Ryan agrees to have dinner with her, but the plan backfires when he learns that she is not actually pregnant. Kelly does not understand why the lie would upset him and is surprised and upset when he refuses to date her again. Ryan later asks Corporate to have Kelly's job outsourced to India.

Getting over her breakup with Ryan, Kelly begins a new relationship with warehouse foreman Darryl Philbin. However, Darryl seems less than enthusiastic about the relationship, evoking Ryan's previous attitude toward Kelly. Darryl also complains that Kelly seems to still have feelings for Ryan. In "Goodbye, Toby", Ryan is arrested on charges of fraud, amusing Kelly.

=== Seasons 5–6 ===
Kelly continues to date Darryl, though Ryan seems to have a renewed interest in her. In "Business Trip", Ryan moves back to the annex with Kelly; though Kelly states she has no intention of getting back together with Ryan given the way he treated her, the two later passionately kiss. Kelly breaks up with Darryl and rekindles a relationship with Ryan; however, they break up again when Ryan takes a trip to Thailand.

Towards the end of the fifth season, Kelly shows interest in her new boss, Charles Miner, and befriends the new receptionist, Erin. When Ryan returns to the Scranton office, he and Kelly begin dating again.

=== Seasons 7–9 ===
In "The Search", Ryan and Kelly announce to the staff they are getting a divorce, having married over a week earlier on the spur of the moment. They claim the break-up was mutual, but after getting little reaction to their news, Ryan declares that the split was not amicable. Following the divorce, Ryan and Kelly continue to date. Kelly enrolls in a minority executive training program, despite Dwight trying to force her out of it. She implies to Dwight that if what she learns there gets her into a position where she would have the authority to fire him, she would. At the end of the season, she joins the committee to find a new manager, replacing Gabe after he is sent back to the corporate headquarters. She is implied to have been bribed to allow Dwight to have the job, to the displeasure of Jim, also on the committee.

In Season 8, wanting to get Kelly away from Ryan, Pam sets her up with Cece's pediatrician, Ravi. Ryan makes several attempts to get back with Kelly, even writing a poem that Kelly refuses to read. When Ryan pressures her to choose between Ravi and him, Kelly rejects Ryan and chooses Ravi, though she expresses hope that she and Ryan can stay friends. She also mentions that she went to the minority executive training program, but does not seem to have learned anything from it. The only thing she is shown doing as a result of it is selecting the employees' Christmas gift, Hello Kitty laptop sleeves, which none of them like. A scene where she calls her professor also implies they may have had a relationship (which explains how she completed the program despite seemingly not learning anything).

At the beginning of Season 9, Kelly reveals she and Ravi got engaged and moved to Oxford, Ohio. Kelly happily quit her job at Dunder-Mifflin, mistakenly believing she was moving to Miami with Ravi. Upon discovering Kelly's move, Ryan also moves to Ohio, though he claims it's for unrelated reasons. In the series finale, Kelly and Ravi are still engaged, while Ryan is a single parent, raising a baby named Drake. At Dwight and Angela's wedding reception, Ryan induces a mild allergic reaction in his baby so that Ravi will have to examine him, using that as an excuse to get Kelly alone and tell her that he wants her back. Ecstatic, Kelly runs away with Ryan, abandoning Drake at the wedding reception; Nellie then offers to adopt Drake.

== Behind the scenes ==
Kelly's character was conceived after the pilot episode; she first appears in the second episode "Diversity Day", in which she angrily slaps Michael Scott (played by Steve Carell) after he speaks in a stereotypical Indian accent during a conference meeting. Kelly's portrayer Mindy Kaling, who served as a writer on the show for the first eight seasons, revealed that the conception of her character was a last-minute decision by co-creator Greg Daniels, commenting "[In the script], they needed a minority to slap [Michael], and [Greg] picked me", further adding, "Greg wanted a kind of shy character that you didn't know much about, except that she was ethnic, to kind of wander in, really pissed off."

Initially introduced in the first season as a quiet and mild-mannered employee, Kelly was rewritten and expanded in the second season, with the character being portrayed as loquacious and adolescent. In a 2007 interview with The A.V. Club, Kaling spoke about the character change, stating, "[The] first season seems so different than how she is now—the way she dresses, and everything else." She credited the season 2 episode "Valentine's Day" as helping her understand Kelly's personality: "She goes on for a page and a half of dialogue about what happened to her the day before, [and] I really felt like I had an idea of what Kelly was about." The character's new personality received positive reviews from critics; Dhalia Lithwick, a senior editor at Slate magazine called the character one of the reasons to look forward to the return of the show in the fall of 2007.

Kaling departed from the cast and crew after the eighth season to work on The Mindy Project, which Kaling created and starred as the lead character. As a result, Kelly was written out of the ninth season; she has a guest appearance in the ninth season premiere and the series finale.
