= Valentine's Day (The Office) =

- The Office episode
- Episode no.: Season 2 Episode 16
- Directed by: Greg Daniels
- Written by: Michael Schur
- Cinematography by: Randall Einhorn
- Editing by: David Rogers
- Production code: 2016
- Original air date: February 9, 2006
- Running time: 22 minutes

Guest appearances
- Charles Esten as Josh Porter; Craig Anton as Craig; Andy Buckley as David Wallace; Conan O'Brien as himself

Episode chronology
| ← Previous "Boys and Girls" | Next → "Dwight's Speech" |
- The Office (American season 2)

"Valentine's Day" is the sixteenth episode of the second season of the American comedy television series The Office and the show's twenty-second episode overall. Written by Michael Schur and directed by Greg Daniels, the episode first aired in the United States on February 9, 2006 on NBC. The episode guest stars Craig Anton, Andy Buckley, Charles Esten, and Conan O'Brien as himself.

The series depicts the everyday lives of office employees in the Scranton, Pennsylvania branch of the fictional Dunder Mifflin Paper Company. In this episode, Michael Scott (Steve Carell) travels to New York City to give a presentation to new Dunder Mifflin CFO David Wallace (Buckley), but carelessly tells everyone that he "hooked up" with Jan Levinson (Melora Hardin). Meanwhile, the rest of the office is jealous when Phyllis Lapin's (Phyllis Smith) boyfriend Bob Vance gives her several gifts. Also, Angela Martin (Angela Kinsey) gives Dwight Schrute (Rainn Wilson) a bobblehead model of himself.

The episode was the first time that Pam Beesly (Jenna Fischer) had a different hairstyle. Many of the scenes were improvised, including Dwight's line about ham and Michael's antics in New York. "Valentine's Day" received mostly positive reviews from television critics and was watched by 8.95 million viewers.

== Plot ==
Before a Valentine's Day meeting at the corporate offices in New York City with Jan Levinson and the new CFO David Wallace, Michael Scott, defending Jan to the other branch managers, lets slip that he and Jan "hooked up". At the meeting, Michael shows a sentimental video about the staff at his branch called "The Faces of Scranton" before providing data on the financial status of his branch as asked. Craig, from the Albany branch, is completely unprepared for the meeting and attempts to cover for it by insinuating that Jan is giving Michael preferential treatment because of the supposed sexual encounter between them. Due to Wallace hearing this accusation, Jan is convinced that her career is over. Michael defuses the situation by telling the CFO that it was a bad joke and Jan is innocent of any unethical behavior. As Michael leaves, Jan kisses him in the elevator, but groans when she realizes they were caught on camera.

Back in the office, Angela Martin gives Dwight Schrute a "Dwight" bobblehead doll. Not having anticipated Angela would be interested in Valentine's Day gifts, Dwight consults with Pam Beesly, who advises him to choose a gift based less on the gift itself than on the meaning of giving it. He gives Angela a key to his home. Phyllis Lapin is inundated with gifts from her boyfriend Bob Vance, while Pam is irritated with her fiancé Roy Anderson when the only thing he gives her for Valentine's Day is the promise of the "best sex of [her] life". Jim Halpert is happy to be single on Valentine's Day, leaving him free to enjoy a poker night with friends. He is forced to listen to Kelly Kapoor talk about how Ryan Howard kissed her during a bar meetup with friends. Ryan regrets the entire encounter because it happened the day before Valentine's Day, and turns down Kelly for a date on Valentine's Day. Jim tries in vain to persuade Kelly to give up on Ryan.

== Production ==
This episode was the fourth episode of the series directed by series creator Greg Daniels. Daniels had previously directed the first season episode "Basketball", along with the second season episodes "The Dundies" and "The Client". "Valentine's Day" was written by Michael Schur, who plays Dwight's Amish cousin Mose.

The episode was deliberately written and shot to play against viewer expectations that a Valentine's Day episode of The Office would necessarily include a Jim and Pam plot thread, including a number of shots where they both appear without interacting. The initial draft of the script in fact ended with a scene in which Jim steals Dwight's poem for Angela and gives it to Pam to lighten her mood after her disappointing Valentine's Day, but this scene was cut as the writers decided to emphasize that Jim is moving on from Pam and starting to enjoy a life independent of her.

For the first time ever on The Office, Pam Beesly's (Jenna Fischer) hair is in a different style. Several hairstyles were shown to Greg Daniels before the one used in the episode was selected. Dwight's line about a ham being a romantic gift was written during filming on the set. The writers did not have a punchline in the scene, so they came up with several alternatives, including ham, as well as "a boombox". Schur wrote the scene where Michael mistakes a woman for Tina Fey, inspired by his time working for Saturday Night Live, when he observed that seemingly every woman with glasses who walked by the Rockefeller Center was mistaken for Tina Fey. However, most of the street scenes in New York City were improvised. They had to be kept short because crowds quickly formed around Steve Carell when he was recognized. Conan O'Brien appeared in a cameo in the episode. He previously worked with Daniels on the writing staffs for Not Necessarily the News, Saturday Night Live and The Simpsons and the two also went to Harvard University together. Despite the brevity of his appearance, the shot required 15 takes due to difficulties getting the timing right and the frequency with which passers-by recognized O'Brien.

The film-within-a-TV-episode "The Faces of Scranton" was written to use "With or Without You" as background music. After the writers found out that the rights for the song's use were extremely expensive, they tried a number of other, less costly songs, but could not find one which was as funny in the scene. They were pleasantly surprised when the studio approved the expense of using "With or Without You". Michael having the requested branch info was not originally part of the episode, but this short scene was added in because the show's producers felt it was implausible that Michael would not be fired if he presented a sentimental film in lieu of a financial report requested by his superiors.

The Season Two DVD contains a number of deleted scenes from this episode. Notable cut scenes include Michael handing out plastic roses to the female staff of the Scranton branch, Michael choosing the most attractive part of a woman, Creed calling Oscar "Ace", Michael meeting Devon in New York, the Vance Refrigeration employees getting into a slapping fight, Michael wondering why his meeting is on Valentine's Day, Jim learning that Dwight has a girlfriend, and Kevin learning that his fiancée has returned to town.

== Cultural references ==
Michael notes that New York is the "city so nice they named it twice". He then proceeds to explain that the other name is Manhattan, failing to realize the limerick refers to the city of New York, which also lies in the state of New York. Later, he eats pizza at a Sbarro restaurant, a chain restaurant, but calls it his "favorite New York pizza joint". At Rockefeller Center, Michael thinks he sees Tina Fey, but it turns out to be a random person. Unbeknownst to Michael, Conan O'Brien walks past him. Near the end of the episode, Michael is posing in front of a Broadway sign for Fiddler on the Roof, and he says "Oy, vey! Schmear!" in a Yiddish accent. Michael's "Faces of Scranton" video plays over "With or Without You" by the Irish rock band U2. Michael later quotes a line from the 1980 comedy film Airplane! when he talks to Jan: "Don't call me Shirley".

When preparing to enter the Dunder Mifflin office for his presentation, Michael is seen sitting by the fountain in front of the tower at 1251 Sixth Avenue, directly across the street from Rockefeller Center. He gets up and walks toward the street, then is seen speaking to the camera in the lobby of the Simon & Schuster building at 1230 6th Avenue, indicating that Dunder Mifflin corporate has offices in that building.

== Reception ==
"Valentine's Day" originally aired on NBC in the United States on February 9, 2006. The episode was viewed by 8.95 million viewers. This marked a dramatic improvement from the previous episode "Boys and Girls", which was viewed by only 5.42 million viewers.

"Valentine's Day" received mostly positive reviews. Michael Sciannamea of TV Squad wrote that "The Office continues to deliver outstanding episodes week after week." Sciannamea went on to say that the episode was "one of their best" and that it left him "wanting more". "M. Giant" of Television Without Pity graded the episode with a "A". Brendan Babish of DVD Verdict was pleased with the entry and awarded it an "A−". He named the highlight of the episode "Michael's overwrought 'The Faces of Scranton' presentation played over U2's 'With or Without You.'" Betsy Bozdech of DVD Journal called the episode "memorable" and noted that it illustrated Pam and Jim's relationship ebb and flow. Francis RizzoIII of DVD Talk declared that Ryan's statement about beginning to date Kelly before Valentine's Day was "one of the funniest lines in the entire season."

After the episode, fans wanted their own bobblehead dolls of Dwight. A petition was started to get NBC to sell them at their online store. NBC responded by creating an initial run of 4,000 bobblehead dolls, which sold out almost immediately. The network decided to make more, and since then, the bobblehead has become the best-selling merchandise on the NBC website, and has sold over 150,000 units.
