= The Dundies =

- The Office episode
- Episode no.: Season 2 Episode 1
- Directed by: Greg Daniels
- Written by: Mindy Kaling
- Cinematography by: Randall Einhorn
- Editing by: David Rogers
- Production code: 2003
- Original air date: September 20, 2005
- Running time: 22 minutes

Guest appearances
- Melora Hardin as Jan Levinson; David Denman as Roy Anderson; Christopher T. Wood as Chili's manager

Episode chronology
← Previous "Hot Girl"	Next → "Sexual Harassment"
- The Office (American season 2)

"The Dundies" is the first episode of the second season of the American comedy television series The Office and the show's seventh episode overall. Written by Mindy Kaling and directed by Greg Daniels, who is also a producer for the show, the episode originally aired in the United States on September 20, 2005, on NBC.

The series depicts the everyday lives of office employees in the Scranton, Pennsylvania branch of the fictional Dunder Mifflin Paper Company. In the episode, Michael Scott (Steve Carell) hosts "The Dundies", the annual awards show in which he presents awards to various members of the office. But the night does not turn out as he plans, and Michael ends up angering or humiliating the majority of the office staff. Meanwhile, after Pam Beesly (Jenna Fischer) argues with her fiancé, she becomes obviously intoxicated and kisses Jim Halpert (John Krasinski).

"The Dundies" was the second episode of the series directed by Greg Daniels. Many of the scenes at the Chili's had to be changed so the restaurant would allow filming, most notably the scenes where Pam falls over. "The Dundies" was viewed by an estimated 9.0 million viewers and received a 4.3/10 rating share among adults between the ages of 18 and 49, making it the highest episode of the series since the show's pilot. The episode received positive reviews from critics.

== Plot ==
Michael Scott is the only person who looks forward to "The Dundies", his annual office awards show at the local Chili's restaurant. Many of the awards given by Michael at past Dundies, as well as most of his jokes during the "ceremony," are offensive and/or make embarrassing references to his employees' personal lives. Jim Halpert tries to dissuade Michael from once again awarding Pam Beesly the "World's Longest Engagement" award. Meanwhile, Dwight Schrute learns that there is graffiti about Michael on the ladies' room wall, and his attempts to investigate are embarrassingly unsuccessful.

At the awards show, Michael's performance as MC falls flat. Ryan Howard is embarrassed when Michael awards him "Hottest in the Office". Pam's fiancé Roy Anderson and Darryl Philbin leave, taking Pam with them. In the parking lot, Roy and Pam argue, and Pam returns alone to the restaurant, where she begins soliciting partially-drank alcoholic beverages from other customers. Heckled by other customers, Michael becomes despondent and decides to end the show, but an intoxicated Pam leads the office in encouraging him to continue. Relieved upon winning the Dundie for "Whitest Sneakers" (as opposed to "Longest Engagement"), Pam gives a drunken and heartfelt acceptance speech and kisses Jim on the lips. This leaves Jim surprised, but happy.

Having caught Pam taking other customers' drinks, a Chili's manager tells the camera crew that she will be banned from the chain's restaurants. (Note: In 2017, Fischer returned to Chili's and tweeted a selfie standing outside the restaurant with the caption "Should I try to go in?" Chili's responded with "we hope you felt God tonight," referring to Pam's line in the episode, "I feel God in this Chili's tonight". Chili's later issued a press release stating that it had "removed the longstanding ban on a Scranton, Pennsylvania woman who allegedly caused a disturbance during a company awards party held at a Chili's near the Pennsylvania town of Scranton." Chili's president Kelli Valade said, "After reviewing the good conduct of Pam, I have decided to lift the now 11-year ban ... Pam is an inspiration to many and we welcome her with open arms.") As the group leaves the restaurant, Pam admits to Jim that it was she who wrote the graffiti. She begins to ask Jim a question, but stops when she notices the camera. Jim helps Pam into Angela Martin's car.

== Production ==
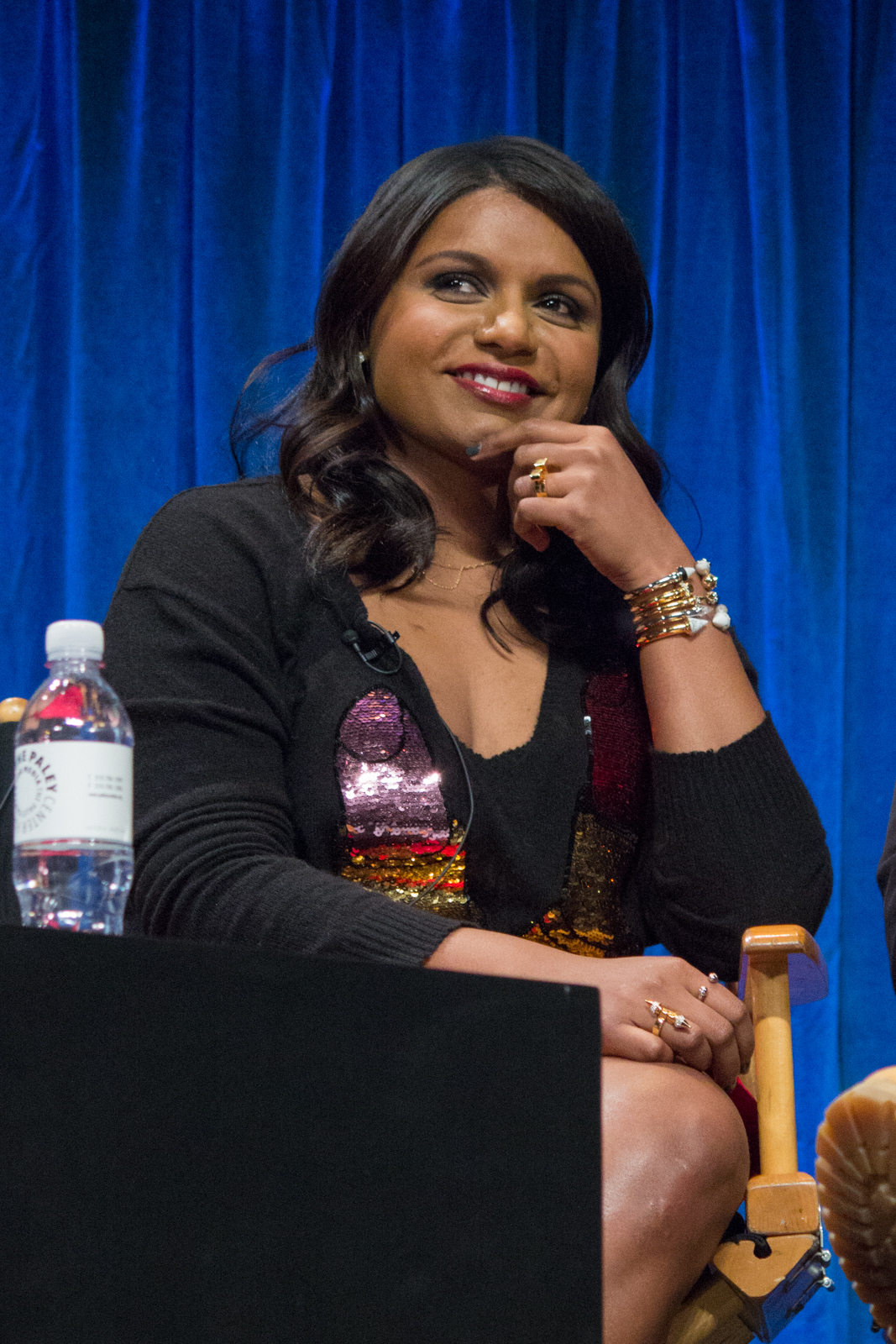
The episode was written by Mindy Kaling.

"The Dundies" was the second episode of the series directed by Greg Daniels. Daniels had previously directed the first season episode "Basketball". "The Dundies" was written by Mindy Kaling, who also acts for the show as customer service representative Kelly Kapoor. According to Daniels, while he worked on the Fox animated series King of the Hill, the show would have an annual Dundies-type event called the "Swampy Awards". He previously considered using the plot from this episode for the pilot, but decided it was a "very risky thing to do" and decided to make the pilot a direct adaption of the first episode of the British version. Following the mixed reaction towards the first season, the writers attempted to make the series more "optimistic" and make Michael more likable. They also began fleshing out the supporting characters of the series more by giving them actual personalities. Finally, to further differentiate the series from its British inspiration, the producers made the lights in the office brighter.

"The Dundies" was the third episode produced for season two, and was intended to bring to a head the building plot thread of Michael hitting on Ryan that began in "The Fire", but the broadcast order shuffled episodes around such that "The Dundies" instead introduced this plot thread to audiences.

Certain parts of the episode were filmed at a former Chili's in the San Fernando Valley, in the city of Panorama City, California, on the corner of Roscoe Blvd. and Tobias Ave, across the street from Panorama Mall. The episode was filmed "from dawn, until very late at night", according to Kaling. During filming breaks, Kaling explained that she took "ladylike" naps, Paul Lieberstein made notes on the episode and its script, and Phyllis Smith and Angela Kinsey read novels. Kaling found the location unpleasant because the air conditioning was inadequate and she found the server bringing them fake food to be mean.

While filming, many parts of the script were changed so the restaurant would allow the shoot to continue. For instance, in the original script, Pam vomits at Chili's and Dwight responds, "A woman has vomited!" Because the completed script was not available for Chili's to review until shooting had already started, when they were finally given a chance to read it, they objected to a customer vomiting in their restaurant. Chili's withdrew its permission to shoot, but, after a few hours, Steve Carell developed a compromise: Pam would fall off her bar stool and Dwight would respond, "A woman has had a seizure!" In the original version, Pam was also to be over-served alcohol by the Chili's staff, but Chili's—feeling that this would reflect poorly on their character as a company—did not want this in the episode either. To solve this issue, the writers had Pam steal drinks off other tables.

Since Jenna Fischer does not drink much in real life, B. J. Novak took her out so she could get drunk while Novak described to her how she was behaving and how it did not match her own perception. She drew upon this experience for her performance. For the fight with Pam and Roy, Fischer and David Denman were told that they would not be audible in the finished scene, so they improvised largely nonsensical dialogue, only for the crew to end up including the audio in the episode.

== Cultural references ==
Michael calls Jim "Fat Halpert", using a voice reminiscent of the cartoon character Fat Albert. During the "Last Year's Dundies" video, Michael awards Oscar the "Show Me the Money" award, a reference to the 1996 movie Jerry Maguire. Dwight later plays a recorder version of Lou Bega's 1999 cover of "Mambo No. 5" while Michael sings parody lyrics. During a phone call, Jan makes reference to a "tsunami relief fundraiser which somehow lost a lot of money." Michael defends his actions, noting that it was a "fun-raiser", in an attempt to raise the morale of the people in the office following the events of the 2004 Indian Ocean earthquake and tsunami. Michael's psychic act is an homage to and parody of Johnny Carson's Carnac the Magnificent act.

At the Dundies party Michael sings various song parodies, including spoofs of Naughty by Nature's 1991 hit "O.P.P." ("You Down with the Dundies") and Elton John's 1971 hit "Tiny Dancer" ("You Have Won a Tiny Dundie"). He also sings Hot Chocolate's 1975 single "You Sexy Thing" while presenting the "Hottest in the Office" award. Originally, a parody of Eminem's 2002 hit "Lose Yourself" was slated to be featured in the episode, but was axed when Eminem refused to allow permission. In the background of one scene, Michael is seen singing the 1987 song "(I've Had) The Time of My Life", by Bill Medley and Jennifer Warnes. The final scene in the episode features "Tiny Dancer" playing over the actual footage of the show.

== Release and reception ==
"The Dundies" originally aired on NBC in the United States on September 20, 2005. In its original American broadcast, the episode received a 4.3/10% share among adults between the ages of 18 and 49. This means that it was seen by 4.3% of all 18- to 49-year-olds, and 10% of all 18- to 49-year-olds watching television at the time of the broadcast. The episode was seen by 9.0 million viewers, making it the highest-rated episode of the series since the show's pilot episode.

"The Dundies" represented a turning point in the series, in which the show found its own tone and differentiated itself from the British version. It received critical acclaim, unlike the first season. In its "The Top 10 Moments from The Office", IGN ranked Pam's drunken scene at Chili's as number five. Michael Sciannamea of TV Squad stated that "This season's first episode showed a marked improvement over the final episode from last season", and went on to praise the episode's expansion of supporting characters as one of the main reasons for the improvement. In a flashback review, Travis Fickett of IGN complimented the episode for creating the personalities of the supporting characters and for the workers affection towards Michael in the episode. He also praised the Jim and Pam moments in the episode. He ultimately gave the episode a 9.0/10. Seb Patrick of Noise to Signal, while comparing the American version of The Office favorably to its UK counterpart, writes that the series "could be finding its feet again over the course of its opening couple of episodes."

Jacob Clifton from Television Without Pity gave the episode an A rating. Erik Adams of The A.V. Club awarded the episode a "B". Part of his review focused on the scene wherein Pam and Jim both convince Michael to continue on with the Dundies celebration, writing that "they’re clapping and chanting for Michael Scott, human being, and that’s incredibly important for the episodes that will follow". However, he felt that the episode's reputation was slightly inflated by its success, and that the episode, while good, is merely just a start for the success that would follow it.
