= Angela Martin =

Fictional character from The Office (US)

- The Office character
- Angela Kinsey as Angela Martin
- First appearance: "Pilot" (2005)
- Last appearance: "Finale" (2013)
- Created by: Greg Daniels; Ricky Gervais; Stephen Merchant
- Based on: Sheila (British counterpart)
- Portrayed by: Angela Kinsey

In-universe information
- Nickname: Monkey (by Dwight)
- Occupation: Head Accountant, Dunder Mifflin, Scranton, Pennsylvania; Head of the Party Planning Committee, Dunder Mifflin, Scranton, Pennsylvania; Safety Officer, Dunder Mifflin, Scranton, Pennsylvania
- Family: Sean Martin (father); Anne-Marie Martin (mother); Rachael Martin (sister)
- Spouses: Robert Lipton (m. 2011; div. 2013) Dwight Schrute (m. 2014)
- Significant other: Andy Bernard (ex-fiancé)
- Children: Phillip Halsted Schrute (son)
- Religion: Protestant
- Nationality: United States

Angela Noelle Schrute (née Martin; formerly Lipton) is a fictional character in the American version of the television sitcom The Office, portrayed by actress Angela Kinsey. The character is based on Sheila from the original version of The Office. She is introduced as the senior accountant, head of the Party Planning Committee, and safety officer at the Scranton branch of Dunder Mifflin. Her character serves as the stuck-up and more professional face of the branch. She begins a relationship with co-worker Dwight Schrute, whom she begins secretly dating in the second season, has a child with in the eighth, and marries in the ninth. This relationship continues during the fourth season while she is engaged to salesman Andy Bernard. She also has a short-lived marriage with Pennsylvania State Senator Robert Lipton, who is initially believed to be the father of her child, Phillip. Dwight often refers to her affectionately as "Monkey".

== Casting ==
Kinsey initially auditioned for the role of Pam Beesly, which eventually went to Jenna Fischer. The casting director for the show, Allison Jones, said that Kinsey's portrayal of Pam was "too feisty". Sometime later, the casting team offered Kinsey a role written for her named Angela Martin.

== Character biography ==
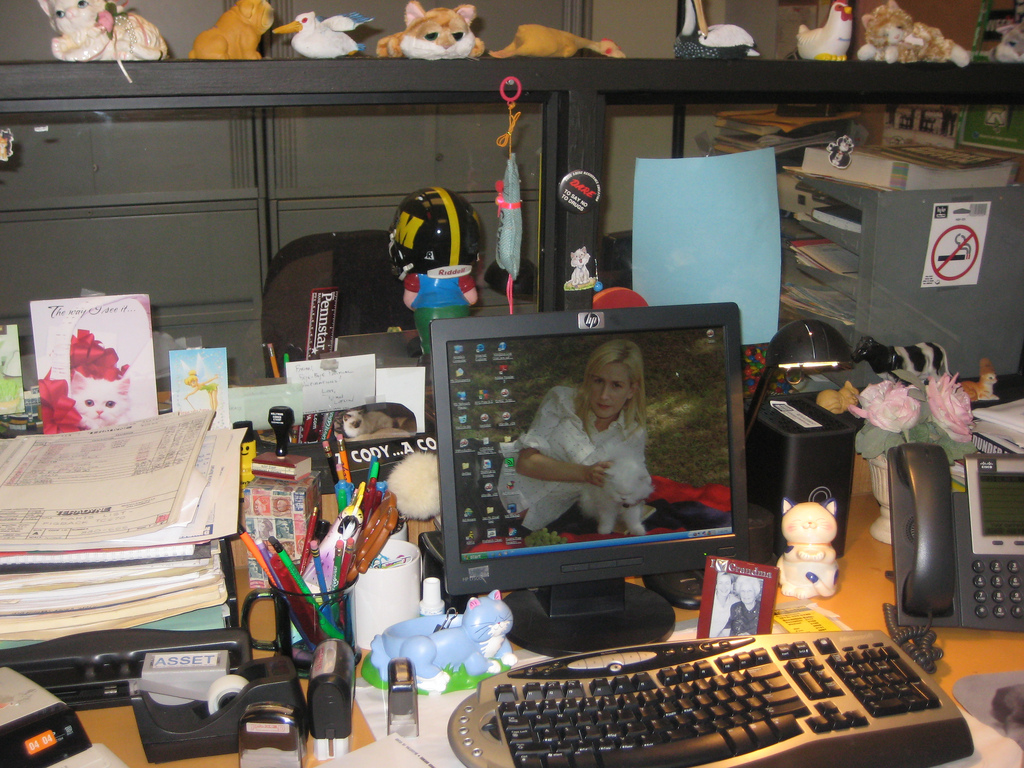
Angela's desk on the set of the show in 2009

Angela Martin was born on November 11, 1974, in Dayton, Ohio. She has one sister named Rachael who is her best friend. In the series finale, she and her sister speak in a secret language they created when they were little. During a talking head in the episode "Performance Review", she says that she "enjoys being judged" and that she participated in beauty pageants as a child. In "A Benihana Christmas", Martin tells the documentary crew that she has a sister who she hasn't spoken to in sixteen years due to a small argument, but it is unknown whether this sister was Rachael. Angela has 12 cats over the course of the series, her favorites being Sprinkles (who is killed by Dwight Schrute in "Fun Run"), Princess Lady, and Garbage whom she accepted as a gift from Andy Bernard when he found it in the warehouse. This stray cat was originally a gift to Angela by Dwight as an apology but she did not accept. The other names of her cats are Ember, Milky Way, Diane, Lumpy, Petals, Mr. Ash, Phillip (the inspiration for her son's name), Bandit, and Comstock, who she gives away when she realizes her son is allergic to him. Over the series, she is seen to be very close to her cats. During "Lecture Circuit: Part 2", fellow accountants Oscar Martinez and Kevin Malone see her communicating with her pets at her home via nanny cam.

Angela is very petite and is constantly mocked by regional manager Michael Scott for it. During the episode "Women's Appreciation", she tells the documentarian that she'll sometimes buy clothes for large, colonial dolls from the American Girl Doll store because "the clothes at the GAP Kids are too flashy." She later reveals that she is 5'1" at her tallest, and in "Stress Relief" she says she is eighty-two pounds. In the season one episode "Health Care", Dwight confirms that she has dermatitis. At the Scranton branch of Dunder Mifflin, she is the senior accountant and was the head of the party planning committee (P.P.C.). She was replaced by Phyllis Vance in the fourth season finale as a use of blackmail. She was also the branch's safety officer until Dwight takes over sometime in the second season. Also in the second season, she begins a secret relationship with Dwight. This is first suspected by Pam Beesly in the episode "Email Surveillance", where Angela is seen buying two candy bars, one for Dwight. It is also noticed by Jim Halpert in the episode "The Negotiation". When at work, Angela and Dwight hook up in a supply closet in the branch's warehouse. She is also engaged to salesman Andy Bernard in the fifth season and married to Pennsylvania State Senator Robert Lipton in the eighth and ninth seasons.

Throughout the series, Angela is shown to have very picky taste. While playing a game of Desert Island in the episode "The Fire", she states that the books she would bring to a deserted island would be the Bible, The Purpose Driven Life, and The Da Vinci Code (just so that she could burn it). She is fan of the song "The Little Drummer Boy", posters of young children doing adult-like activities, Anne Geddes-style photographs of babies, and she has a crush on Boris Becker. Angela also apparently watches Will & Grace, but only the scenes with Harry Connick Jr. During the episode "Office Olympics", she tells the documentarian that she likes playing games with her cats and singing. She dislikes apologizing, Kevin, and the colors green and orange. She is seen driving a first-generation Ford Focus Sedan in the second season and a second-generation Saturn S-Series in the sixth. During the fourth season, Andy offers several locations for their wedding, including EPCOT Center, a Marriott Ballroom, and hot-air balloon rides. She turns these all down and eventually requests to be married at Schrute Farms, Dwight's beet farm. However, when Andy suggests a retirement in Celebration, Florida, she happily agrees. Angela also states several times that she is vegetarian.

== Character history ==
=== Seasons 1–3 ===
Angela is first seen in the pilot episode in a corner of the office behind reception, where the accountants work, at the Scranton branch of Dunder Mifflin Paper. She is later revealed to be the senior accountant, the head of the Party Planning Committee (first seen in "The Alliance"), and the safety officer (seen in "Basketball"). She is very stuck-up and is a "tight-ass" according to Michael ("The Dundies"). While she has respect for Oscar's intelligence, they often quarrel over who is right in various discussions. She is also disgusted by Kevin, who is constantly filling out worksheets wrong and eating, although she is very occasionally shown to be enjoying Kevin's company and engaging in playful banter with him (such as in "The Injury") . She also has a power struggle with Dwight, who thinks that he is the safety officer. In a deleted scene from the season two opener, she tells the documentary crew that she is also the branch's designated driver. In the episode "Halloween", she wears a white cat costume, which she is also seen wearing in a photo of her and Sprinkles.

During "Email Surveillance", Pam begins to suspect a relationship between Angela and Dwight. Her suspicion is proved to be correct when the two can be seen making out at Jim's party later that night, though Pam doesn't see them. In the next episode, "Christmas Party", Angela plans the branch's annual Christmas party and is given a poster of two toddlers playing jazz instruments by Toby Flenderson. Later that season, Angela and Dwight once again have an argument about who will plan Michael's birthday party. During "Conflict Resolution", Michael finds that Angela has lodged several complaints against Dwight but that they were all removed six months prior, most likely because of their relationship. In the episode "The Fire", Pam's then-fiancé Roy thoughtlessly states that he would "do" Angela while playing "Who Would You Do?", and it is strongly hinted that Angela is attracted to Roy too, as not only is he the only character to whom Angela never demonstrates any disapproval, she is seemingly unable to restrain herself from describing him glowingly in private as "strong and capable" and possessing of "character".

In the second episode of the third season, Dwight and Michael travel to a convention with Dunder Mifflin corporate, and Angela secretly follows to surprise Dwight. The next episode, Dwight confides to Angela that while he is fond of Michael, he would be a better regional manager. Angela agrees, and Dwight secretly meets with Jan Levinson-Gould to discuss the matter. Michael finds out and tricks Dwight into thinking that he is no longer regional manager. Not knowing it's a prank, Dwight promises Angela the position of his right-hand man. At the branch's Christmas party, Angela invites transferred employee Karen Filippelli to join the P.P.C. but quickly removes her, claiming that she has no good ideas. This leads Pam and Karen to form The Committee to Plan Parties, and they create a margarita-karaoke Christmas party. This causes some tension between Angela and Pam, and Angela reveals to the camera that she never likes to apologize. Eventually, they decide to merge the parties, and Angela sings her favorite song, "The Little Drummer Boy", on the karaoke machine for the office. At Phyllis' wedding, Angela and Dwight slow-dance together outside the chapel. After Roy Anderson tries to attack Jim Halpert as revenge for kissing Pam on the office's casino night and Dwight saves Jim with a bottle of mace, Angela asks around the office to hear the story of Dwight's bravery. During "Product Recall", Angela is temporarily in charge of answering phone calls due to an inappropriate watermark on Dunder Mifflin's stationery. When the women of the Scranton branch go to the Steamtown Mall ("Women's Appreciation"), Angela shops at the American Girl Store for clothes for "large, colonial dolls", to fit her petite figure.

=== Seasons 4–5 ===
In the season-four opener, Dwight offers to feed Angela's cat, Sprinkles, but ends up killing the cat instead. Though he tries to replace Sprinkles with a farm cat named Garbage (who she later renames Bandit), Angela breaks up with him. In an attempt to win her back, Dwight holds a battle against Dunder Mifflin's new website by trying to make more sales than it within the first hour of being launched. He beats the website's sales, but Angela is unimpressed. At the end of the episode, Andy Bernard asks Angela out by singing "Take a Chance on Me" by ABBA. She accepts, much to Dwight's sadness. In the episode "Dinner Party", Angela and Andy are invited to Michael's condo to have dinner with Pam, Jim, and Jan. Tensions rise at the party, and it only gets worse when Dwight shows up. In the season finale, Andy proposes to Angela in front of his parents, and she reluctantly says yes. However, in the very end of the episode, Phyllis Vance catches Angela and Dwight hooking up in the office. Throughout season five, Angela continues her secret romance with Dwight while engaged to Andy. Meanwhile, Andy spends most of the season trying to find the perfect wedding location, but most of them are turned down by Angela. They eventually settle on Schrute Farms, Dwight's beet farm. In "The Surplus", Andy and Angela tour the farm and stage a fake wedding so Andy can see what the ceremony will look like. However, Dwight later reveals to her that he actually married her, because they both said "I do." Angela reacts angrily to this and makes him annul it. In the next episode, Phyllis hosts her first Christmas party as head of the P.P.C. Angela gets fed up with Phyllis' demands and allows her to spill the secret about her and Dwight, not thinking Phyllis has the guts. However, Phyllis announces it to the whole office, besides Andy, who was in the annex. Andy soon finds out in the following episode, "The Duel". Andy and Dwight plan a duel in the parking lot after work to decide who will get to keep Angela. In the end, they both realize that neither of them want Angela, and she is left single. Angela soon develops a crush on Charles Miner, a new employee at corporate, and battles with Kelly Kapoor for his attention.

=== Seasons 6–9 ===
In "The Delivery", Dwight sees that Pam and Jim are using their unborn child as a selling point and decides that he would like to do the same. He suggests to Angela that they try to create a child together. Angela is excited by Dwight's sudden attention toward her but realizes that he just wants her to make a baby. In "Happy Hour", Dwight blows off Angela to meet with Pam's cousin, Isabel, which angers Angela. Soon after, Angela hires a mediator to go over the contract she and Dwight signed and realizes that he could be forced to give her $30,000. Knowing he cannot pay this, Angela gives Dwight a "settlement" of attempting to procreate five separate times. He agrees to this and they use a punch-card to keep track. In the third episode of the seventh season, Dwight reveals that he is no longer interested in Angela. However, he still takes her to a play Andy is performing in that evening. After the show, Dwight offers to use one of their five attempts, but Angela clips the punch-card, happy enough with a simple date. In the end of "WUPHF.com", Angela meets Pennsylvania State Senator Robert Lipton at Dwight's hay festival in the office parking lot. They hit it off, and Angela decides to talk with the senator instead of meeting Dwight. In the season finale, Robert proposes to Angela, and she accepts. At the start of the eighth season, Angela is married to the senator and pregnant. While giving a speech at Andy's "Garden Party", Angela reveals the name of her son to be Phillip, named after her favorite cat, and argues with Pam, who is also naming her son Phillip. In "Jury Duty", Angela gives birth to her son, and Dwight believes it to be his, though Angela denies this. In the eighth season finale, "Free Family Portrait Studio", Dwight steals a full diaper from Angela to test Phillip's DNA. During the ninth season, Angela suspects that Robert may be cheating on her and asks Oscar to help her find out, not knowing that Oscar is dating Robert. Oscar takes Angela to her husband's yoga class, where they see Robert flirting with multiple young men. They see him dialing his phone and Oscar's phone rings. Angela finds out the truth and goes to break off her marriage. Several episodes later, Dwight invites Angela to come to his house to help him to take care of his aunt (who raised him). The aunt assumes that they are engaged, but Angela says rather sadly, "We are just friends." However, this friendship is ended when Dwight begins to date a neighboring brussels sprout farmer, just to make her jealous. In "A.A.R.M.", Dwight proposes to Angela and she finally reveals to him that he is indeed the father of Phillip. She accepts the proposal and they are married in the series finale.

== Reception ==
On FanSided, Patrick Schmidt describes Angela as "The cold-hearted head of accounting. A petite woman, she views her co-workers mostly as distractions. Angela is definitely not out to make friends. Often she shows open disdain for her co-workers, especially Kevin and Meredith." Screen Rant said "While she'll always be known as the rudest one in the office, fans have to admit that she's a different woman by the series finale. She started joining the office shenanigans, made more small-talk with Pam, and dare we say smiled more."
