= Hot Girl (The Office) =

- The Office episode
- Episode no.: Season 1 Episode 6
- Directed by: Amy Heckerling
- Written by: Mindy Kaling
- Cinematography by: Randall Einhorn
- Editing by: Dave Rogers
- Production code: 1003
- Original air date: April 26, 2005

Guest appearances
- Amy Adams as Katy Moore; Melora Hardin as Jan Levinson; David Denman as Roy Anderson

Episode chronology
← Previous "Basketball"	Next → "The Dundies"
- The Office (American TV series) season 1

"Hot Girl" is the sixth episode and season finale of the first season of the American comedy television series The Office. The episode aired on NBC in the United States on April 26, 2005. The episode was written by consulting producer Mindy Kaling, marking her first writing credit for the series. The episode was directed by Amy Heckerling, her only directing credit for the series.

In this episode, Michael (played by Steve Carell) allows an attractive salesperson (Amy Adams) to sell her purses in the office, catching the eye of almost every male in the office. Pam (Jenna Fischer) and Jim (John Krasinski) use the situation to play another prank on Dwight (Rainn Wilson).

"Hot Girl" received mostly positive reviews from critics. According to Nielsen Media Research, the episode received 4.8 million viewers and received a 2.3 rating/5% share among adults between the ages of 18 and 49.

== Plot ==
Corporate informs Michael Scott that an incentive program has been set up where the top Dunder Mifflin sales representative will be rewarded with a prize of up to $1,000. As Michael decides on the prize, Katy Moore, a pretty young purse saleswoman, comes into the office to sell her wares. Michael lets her set up shop in the conference room. As he shows her around the office, Michael tries to impress her while doing his best to impede the chances of any other office male getting a date with her, going so far as to spend the aforementioned $1,000 on an espresso machine because she likes coffee. Roy Anderson mentions that he would go for her if he were not dating Pam Beesly, and an angry Pam corrects him that they are engaged.

Jim Halpert convinces Dwight Schrute to approach Katy and buy a purse, which he does to Pam and Jim's delight. However, Katy turns Dwight down when he asks her out. When Michael hears she will need a ride home, he offers to drive her. While Pam is sitting on Jim's desk and talking to him, Roy comes up and gets Pam out of her bad mood by tickling her; an uncomfortable Jim leaves his desk. Jim strikes up a conversation with Katy, and later tells Pam that he and Katy are going on a date for the weekend, but Pam is unsure if he is joking or not, particularly after he says he and Katy may get matching tattoos. Katy accepts a ride from Jim, leaving Michael devastated. As Katy and Jim agree to go out for a drink while getting in his car, Pam realizes Jim was serious about him and Katy.

== Production ==
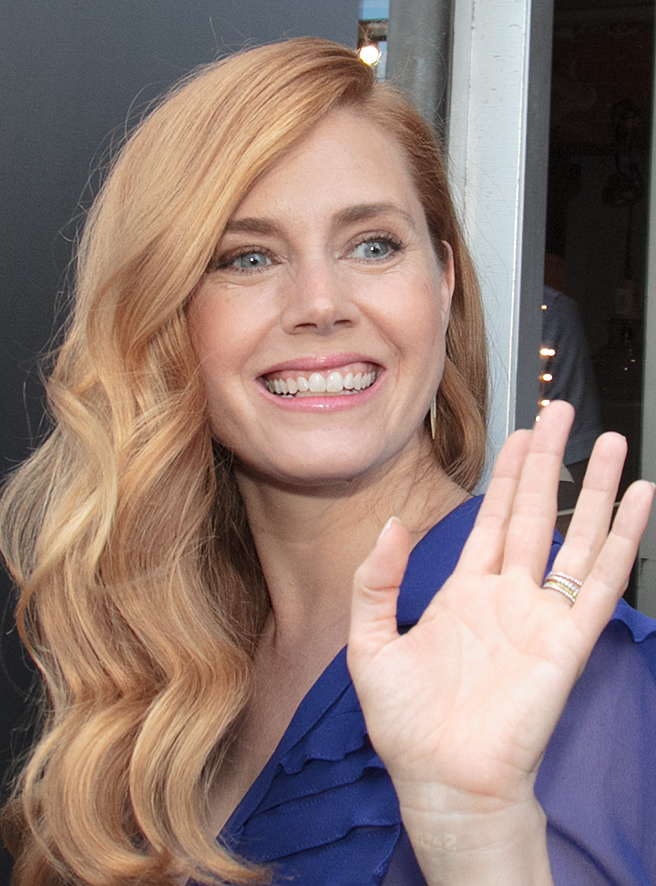
"Hot Girl" introduced the recurring character Katy, played by Amy Adams.

"Hot Girl" was the first episode written by writer and actress Mindy Kaling, who portrays Kelly Kapoor. Kaling became one of the most prolific writers for the series, writing 22 of its episodes. She was later promoted to executive producer of the show for its eighth season. The episode was also the first and only one directed by Amy Heckerling.

"Hot Girl" introduced the recurring role of Katy, portrayed by Amy Adams. Katy would appear in two more episodes: "The Fire" and "Booze Cruise". Adams remarked that she thoroughly enjoyed her work on the show. In an interview with The Advocate, she said that The Office "was the best work experience. I loved that show and that cast so much. I don't know if they believe me, but every time I see them I'm like, 'Oh my gosh, I'll do anything to come back.'" The show writers initially felt that Adams and Jenna Fischer were too similar, so a different actress was cast as Katy instead. However, after a day of filming, NBC felt that the new actress was not the right fit, and so the producers gave the role to Adams. Several years after she left the show as a recurring character, B. J. Novak wanted to write her a cameo in the seventh season episode "Threat Level Midnight", but she was unavailable for filming. "Hot Girl" was one of two first-season episodes, the other being "Health Care", that did not contain commentary by members of the cast and crew on the season DVD.

== Reception ==
=== Ratings ===
In its original American broadcast on April 26, 2005, "Hot Girl" was viewed by an estimated 4.8 million viewers and received a 2.3/5% rating share among adults between the ages of 18 and 49. This means that it was seen by 2.3% of all 18- to 49-year-olds, and 5% of all 18- to 49-year-olds watching television at the time of the broadcast. The episode, airing after Scrubs, retained 81% of its lead-in audience. The episode, along with Scrubs, ranked fourth in its timeslot, being beaten by a rerun of the Fox medical drama House which received a 6.3 rating in the 18–49 demographic, the CBS reality show The Amazing Race which received a 5.1 rating, and ABC, which ran a rerun of the comedy According to Jim and a new episode of the sitcom Rodney, averaging a 3.3 rating. "Hot Girl" received the lowest rating in the show's history until it was beaten by the season eight episode "Tallahassee" almost seven years later. After the lackluster reception of the episode, Media Life Magazine erroneously predicted that "Hot Girl" would also serve as the de facto series finale.

=== Reviews ===
The episode received moderately positive reviews from critics. Travis Fickett from IGN retroactively gave the episode an 8.0 out of 10, signifying a "great" episode. Fickett wrote that "Hot Girl" helped to establish what type of character Michael would eventually become in the subsequent seasons, noting the character's "deep and desperate loneliness" which would eventually become a main conceit in the series. He concluded that the episode ended with a "classic Office moment"—Michael realizing that Jim will be giving Katy a ride home—that "captures the desperation and loneliness of [Pam, Jim, and Michael] – and does a great job of setting the stage for the show's terrific second season." Miss Alli from Television Without Pity gave the episode a B but described it as "the weakest of the first season". Alli noted that the episode was largely the "play on the same joke", featuring Michael and Dwight "making idiots of themselves over Katy". However, she did positively compare the American version of the show to the British version, stating, "All things considered, I think the first season is very underrated owing to unnecessary comparisons to the British version", but concluded that the episode was "its weak moment".

Erik Adams of The A.V. Club awarded the episode a "B+". Adams largely praised Fischer's performance, noting that she "helped build her character's arc every step of the way" in the series and that several of her moments in "Hot Girl" helped to emphasize this point. Furthermore, he complimented the appearance of Katy, noting that she causes a rift between Pam and Jim, but due to "the confidence of Adams' performance and some hidden compartments in Kaling's script", she also has "legitimate agency".
