= The Office (American TV series) season 1 =

The Office
- Season 1
- DVD cover
- Showrunner: Greg Daniels
- Starring: Steve Carell; Rainn Wilson; John Krasinski; Jenna Fischer; B. J. Novak
- No. of episodes: 6

Release
- Original network: NBC
- Original release: March 24 – April 26, 2005

Season chronology
- Next → Season 2

The first season of the American television comedy The Office premiered in the United States on NBC on March 24, 2005, concluded on April 26, 2005, and consists of six episodes. The Office is an American adaptation of the British TV series, and is presented in a mockumentary format, portraying the daily lives of office employees in the Scranton, Pennsylvania branch of the fictitious Dunder Mifflin Paper Company. The season stars Steve Carell, Rainn Wilson, John Krasinski, Jenna Fischer, and B. J. Novak.

This season introduced the main characters, and established the general plot, which revolves around Michael Scott (Carell), regional manager of the Scranton branch office, trying to convince the filmmakers of the documentary that he presides over a happy, well-running office. Meanwhile, sales rep Jim Halpert (Krasinski) finds methods to undermine his cube-mate, Dwight Schrute (Wilson); receptionist Pam Beesly (Fischer) tries to deal with Michael's insensitivities and flubs; and temporary employee Ryan Howard (Novak) is acting mostly as an observer of the insanity around him.

The first season of The Office aired on Tuesdays in the United States at 9:30 p.m. The season debuted to high numbers and garnered moderately positive reviews from critics, aside from the pilot, which received mixed reviews. While some enjoyed the pilot, others opined that it was a mere copy of the original British version. Universal Studios Home Entertainment released the season in a single DVD on August 16, 2005. The DVD contained all six episodes, along with commentaries from creators, writers, actors, and directors on most of the episodes, as well as deleted scenes from all of the episodes.

== Production ==
The first season of the show was produced by Reveille Productions and Deedle-Dee Productions, both in association with NBC Universal Television Studio. The show is based on the British comedy series of the same name, which was created by Ricky Gervais and Stephen Merchant for the British Broadcasting Corporation (BBC). This season was produced by Greg Daniels, along with consulting producers Larry Wilmore and Lester Lewis. Writers for the season included Daniels, Gervais, Merchant, Michael Schur, Mindy Kaling, Paul Lieberstein, and B. J. Novak. For this season, Schur was a co-producer, Kaling was a staff writer, Lieberstein was a consulting producer, and Novak was an executive story editor. Though Daniels is credited as a writer for "Pilot", the majority of the episode was adapted from "Downsize" of the British series, with many scenes being transferred almost verbatim.

The first season featured episodes directed by five different directors: Ken Kwapis directed "Pilot" and "Diversity Day", Ken Whittingham directed "Health Care", Bryan Gordon directed "The Alliance", Amy Heckerling directed "Hot Girl", and Daniels both produced and directed "Basketball". This season of The Office was almost entirely filmed in an actual office building in Los Angeles, California. Footage of Scranton, Pennsylvania, taken by John Krasinski was also used in the opening theme.

== Cast ==
The Office employed an ensemble cast. Most of the main characters, and some supporting ones, are based on characters from the British version of The Office. While these characters normally have the same attitudes and perceptions as their British counterparts, the roles have been redesigned to better fit the American show. The show featured a large cast size, many of whom were known for their improvisational work.

=== Main ===
- Steve Carell as Michael Scott, regional manager of the Dunder Mifflin Scranton Branch. Loosely based on David Brent, Gervais' character in the British version, Scott is a dim-witted and lonely man, who attempts to win friends as the office comedian, usually making himself look bad in the process.
- Rainn Wilson as Dwight Schrute, who, based upon Gareth Keenan, is the assistant to the regional manager, although the character frequently intentionally omits the "to the" in his title.
- John Krasinski as Jim Halpert, a sales representative and prankster, who is based upon Tim Canterbury, and has a crush on Pam Beesly, the receptionist.
- Jenna Fischer as Pam Beesly, a receptionist based on Dawn Tinsley, is shy, but is often a cohort with Jim in his pranks on Dwight.
- B. J. Novak as Ryan Howard, a temporary worker.

=== Recurring ===
- Melora Hardin as Jan Levinson-Gould, vice president of regional sales.
- David Denman as Roy Anderson, a warehouse worker and Pam's fiancé.
- Leslie David Baker as Stanley Hudson, a grumpy salesman.
- Brian Baumgartner as Kevin Malone, a dim-witted accountant.
- Creed Bratton as Creed Bratton, the office's strange quality assurance officer.
- Kate Flannery as Meredith Palmer, the promiscuous supplier relations rep.
- Mindy Kaling as Kelly Kapoor, the pop-culture obsessed customer service representative.
- Angela Kinsey as Angela Martin, a judgemental accountant, who also serves as Dwight's love interest.
- Paul Lieberstein as Toby Flenderson, the sad-eyed human resources representative.
- Oscar Nunez as Oscar Martinez, an intelligent accountant.
- Craig Robinson as Darryl Philbin, the warehouse manager.
- Phyllis Smith as Phyllis Lapin, a motherly saleswoman.
- Devon Abner as Devon White, a supplier relations representative.

=== Notable guests ===
- Toby Huss as the voice of Todd Packer, a rude and offensive traveling salesman, and Michael's best friend.^{i}
- Larry Wilmore as Mr. Brown, a consultant who arrives to teach the office about tolerance and diversity.
- Patrice O'Neal as Lonny Collins, a warehouse worker.
- Amy Adams as Katy Moore, a handbag saleswoman.

== Broadcast and reception ==
=== Ratings ===
Ratings for each episode of The Office that aired this season.^{i}

The first episode of The Office scored well in ratings, gaining over eleven million viewers, as well as ranking third in its timeslot on the night of its airing. However the episode aired on a Thursday evening, and between the change from the first episode and the second episode, The Office moved to Tuesday evenings. The Office subsequently tumbled in the ratings, averaging under 6.0 million viewers, just over half that of the previous episode. The first-season finale, "Hot Girl", received one of the lowest ratings in the show's history, earning just a 2.2 rating with a 10 share. After the lackluster reception of the episode, many critics erroneously predicted that "Hot Girl" would also serve as the de facto series finale. The Office averaged 5.4 million viewers for its entire season, ranking it #102 for the 2004–2005 U.S. television season.

=== Reviews ===
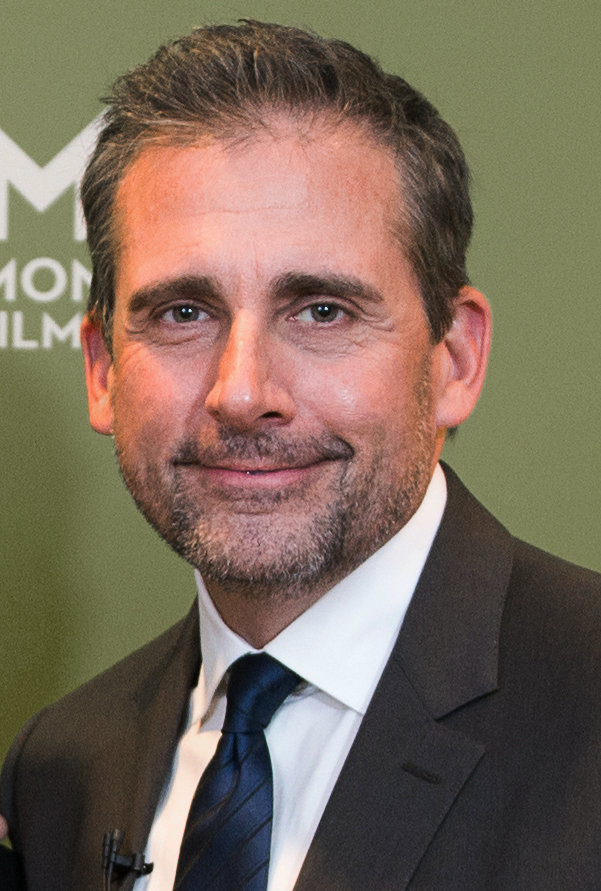
Steve Carell was initially criticized for his portrayal of Michael Scott, although his character soon garnered critical favor.

The series premiere, "Pilot", received largely mixed reviews from critics. After the first episodes, critics thought The Office would be another failed remake of a British comedy, much like how the American version of Coupling was in relation to the original British series. The Deseret Morning News believed The Office was a failed remake, and said "Maybe, after The Office dies a quick death on NBC, the network will decide that trying to Americanize British TV comedies isn't such a great idea." The New York Daily News said the show was "neither daring nor funny", adding that "NBC's version is so diluted there's little left but muddy water". The Los Angeles Times complained that Steve Carell, who portrays Scott and also appeared in the movie Anchorman: The Legend of Ron Burgundy, was "too cartoon" and said: "Lost in translation is the sadness behind the characters."

Despite these criticisms, the remainder of the season earned mostly positive reviews among critics. The season as a whole scored 62 out of 100 on Metacritic (a website that assigns a weighted average score for media), which translates to "generally favorable" reviews. Time magazine wrote that "It's ironic that NBC's most original sitcom in years is a remake, but who cares? The Office is a daring, unflinching take on very American workplace tensions." Boston.com felt that the first season of The Office was good, and the differences between the characters of the American and the original series added to the popularity of the series. Rob Owen of the Pittsburgh Post-Gazette felt that The Office succeeded in its first season, and that although NBC had failed in the past with television shows such as Coupling, it had found achievement with The Office. Entertainment Weekly awarded the season a "B+" and wrote that The Office "is clever and insular, capturing all the drudgery, awkwardness, and rivalry of cubicle living" and that the last five episodes help to illustrate that the series has "crossed the pond handily."

=== Accolades ===
In its first year, The Office was nominated for several awards, including three Writers Guild of America Award nods. These included nominations for Best Comedy Series and Best New Series. For his work on "Diversity Day", B. J. Novak was also nominated for Best Screenplay – Episodic Comedy.

== Episodes ==
No. overall	No. in season	Title	Directed by	Written by	Original release date	Prod. code	U.S. viewers (millions)
1	1	"Pilot"	Ken Kwapis	Ricky Gervais & Stephen Merchant and Greg Daniels	March 24, 2005	1001	11.23
A documentary crew arrives at the Scranton, Pennsylvania, offices of Dunder Mifflin to observe the employees and learn about modern management. Regional manager Michael Scott (Steve Carell) tries to paint a happy picture in the face of potential downsizing from corporate. The office also gets new employee Ryan Howard (B. J. Novak) as a temporary worker, while salesman Jim Halpert (John Krasinski) pranks and antagonizes fellow salesman Dwight Schrute (Rainn Wilson), much to the enjoyment of receptionist Pam Beesly (Jenna Fischer).
2	2	"Diversity Day"	Ken Kwapis	B. J. Novak	March 29, 2005	1002	5.95
Michael's controversial imitation of a Chris Rock routine forces the staff to undergo a racial diversity seminar. A consultant named Al Brown (guest star Larry Wilmore) arrives to teach the staff about tolerance and diversity, but Michael insists on imparting his own knowledge, aggravating both Al and the entire office staff, and creates his own diversity seminar. He eventually assigns each staff member an index card with a different race on it, causing tempers to slowly simmer until they finally snap. Meanwhile, Jim struggles to keep hold of a lucrative contract extension, but Dwight makes the sale for himself. Nevertheless, when Pam falls asleep on Jim's shoulder at the end of the meeting, he concludes that it was "not a bad day."
3	3	"Health Care"	Ken Whittingham	Paul Lieberstein	April 5, 2005	1006	5.83
In an effort to save money to prevent downsizing, Michael puts Dwight in charge of choosing the company's new health care plan. Dwight's chosen plan slashes benefits, much to the chagrin of the other employees. In an attempt to appease them, Michael promises the entire office a surprise, and then spends the rest of the day scrambling to come through with his promise. The employees wait for Michael's surprise, which he awkwardly never delivers. Meanwhile, Jim and Pam amuse themselves with Dwight's medical forms.
4	4	"The Alliance"	Bryan Gordon	Michael Schur	April 12, 2005	1004	5.26
As downsizing rumors swirl, paranoia takes over the members of the office. Dwight forms a "Survivor"-esque alliance with Jim against the other employees—later adding Pam also. Meanwhile, Michael arranges a morale-boosting birthday party for Supplier Relations representative Meredith Palmer (Kate Flannery), although her birthday is more than a month away. Michael agonizes over writing the perfect greeting in her birthday card, and in the end, his joke (and subsequent rejected ones) falls flat, ruining the party.
5	5	"Basketball"	Greg Daniels	Greg Daniels	April 19, 2005	1005	5.03
Michael and the office staff take on the workers in the warehouse in a basketball game, with the losers having to work on Saturday. Through racist and sexist ideals, Michael chooses many of the lesser skilled office workers over their more athletic peers. Michael claims a "flagrant personal intentional foul", stops the game, and declares his team as the winners. The warehouse finds the call unfair and Michael caves under pressure, and concedes the victory to the warehouse staff. Michael eventually tells the office that they don't have to come in on Saturday either, but it does little to calm them: "Like coming in an extra day is going to prevent us from being downsized."
6	6	"Hot Girl"	Amy Heckerling	Mindy Kaling	April 26, 2005	1003	4.83
When an attractive purse saleswoman named Katy (Amy Adams) comes to the office, Michael and Dwight openly vie for her attention. Meanwhile, the corporate office allocates $1,000 as a prize for the top office salesman, but Michael spends the money on an espresso machine, trying to impress Katy. However, in the end she leaves with Jim, devastating both Michael and Dwight.

== DVD release ==
The first season of The Office was released by Universal Studios Home Entertainment as a single-disc Region 1 DVD set on August 16, 2005. The set includes all 6 episodes presented in a 1.78:1 aspect ratio with Dolby Digital 2.0 Stereo sound and optional English and Spanish subtitles. The release also included audio commentaries for 4 episodes, as well as deleted scenes from every episode.

== Explanatory notes ==
^i Toby Huss provided Todd Packer's voice in "Pilot". In subsequent episodes, the character would be played by David Koechner.
^ii Information on individual episode ratings can be found in the "Episodes" section.
