= Diversity Day (The Office) =

- The Office episode
- Episode no.: Season 1 Episode 2
- Directed by: Ken Kwapis
- Written by: B. J. Novak
- Cinematography by: Randall Einhorn
- Editing by: Dave Rogers
- Production code: 1002
- Original air date: March 29, 2005

Guest appearance
- Larry Wilmore as Mr. Brown

Episode chronology
← Previous "Pilot"	Next → "Health Care"
- The Office (American TV series) season 1

"Diversity Day" is the second episode of the first season of the American comedy television series The Office. Written by B. J. Novak and directed by Ken Kwapis, it first aired in the United States on March 29, 2005, on NBC. The episode guest-stars Office consulting producer Larry Wilmore as Mr. Brown.

In this episode, Michael's controversial imitation of a Chris Rock routine, "Niggas vs. Black People", forces the staff to undergo a racial diversity seminar. A consultant arrives to teach the staff about tolerance and diversity, but Michael insists on imparting his own knowledge—aggravating both the consultant and the entire office staff—and creates his own diversity seminar. He eventually assigns each staff member an index card with a different race on it, causing tempers to simmer until they snap. Meanwhile, Jim struggles to keep hold of a lucrative contract extension, but Dwight makes the sale for himself.

"Diversity Day" was the first episode of The Office to feature original writing, as the pilot episode ("Pilot") contained many jokes from the British series pilot. Wilmore, a writer for the show, had to formally audition with other actors because of stipulations with the Screen Actors Guild. The episode received positive reviews from television critics. Despite this, it received a 2.7/6 in the Nielsen ratings among people aged 18–49 and garnered 6.0 million viewers overall, losing almost half of its audience from the previous week.

== Synopsis ==
In answer to Michael's recitation of Chris Rock's "Niggas vs. Black People" routine, the corporate offices of Dunder Mifflin send a representative (Mr. Brown) from Diversity Today to hold a diversity training seminar. After Michael repeatedly attempts to take over the training and makes an issue of signing the form saying he learned something, Brown privately explains to him that the training was purely for Michael's benefit, the other employees were included solely so as not to shame Michael, and corporate will not allow Brown to leave until Michael signs the form. Michael finds this insulting and, as a response, holds his own diversity meeting. He shows a brief video that addresses nothing of significance, claims that his heritage is "two-fifteenths Native American", and instructs everyone to wear index cards with a certain race on it and to treat others however they might treat people of those races. When he delivers a racist impression of an Indian person to Kelly (who is not wearing a card, having missed the activity due to a meeting), she takes offense and slaps him.

Meanwhile, Jim tries to re-up an annual sale that will amount to a quarter of his yearly commission, but he is ultimately undercut by Dwight. However, at the end of Michael’s diversity meeting, Pam dozes on his shoulder, leading Jim to conclude that it was nevertheless "not a bad day".

== Production ==
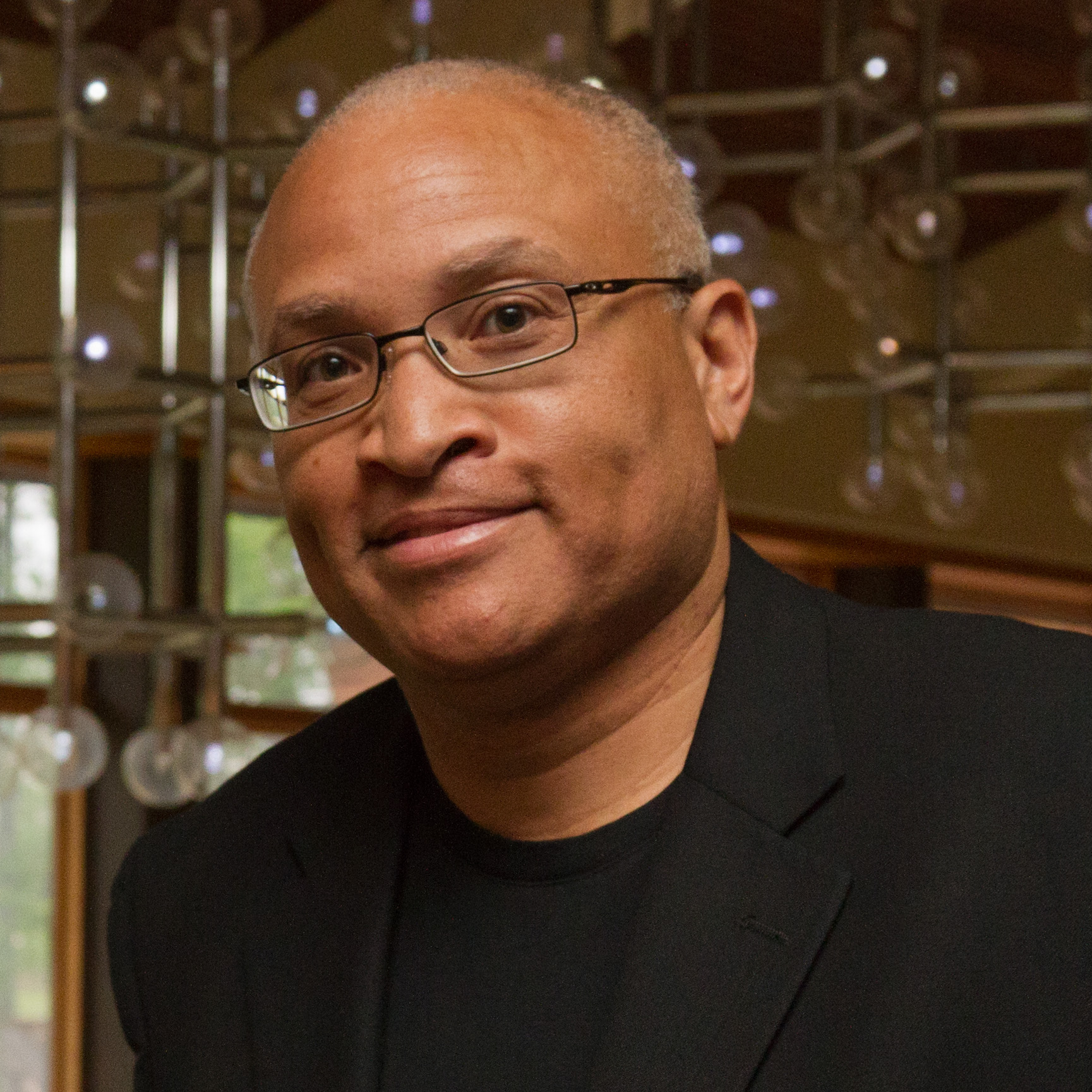
The episode guest-starred Larry Wilmore as Mr. Brown.

Larry Wilmore, who plays the sensitivity trainer Mr. Brown, is a writer for the show. At the table-read for this episode, they had not cast the part yet and producer Greg Daniels had Wilmore read for the role to fill in. After the read, Daniels thought he was perfect for the role. However, because of stipulations with the Screen Actors Guild, producers still had to have Wilmore formally audition with other actors for the role. Daniels was also not sure where to use Mindy Kaling on-screen in the series until the point came in this episode's script when Michael needed to be slapped by a minority. Her character in this episode, however, is far from the bubbly, chatty character that Kelly later becomes.

The second episode of the series was the first to feature predominantly original writing, as the pilot episode contained many jokes from the British series pilot. During one of Michael's impersonations, a racial expletive spoken by Michael had to be censored by the producers for NBC. Daniels was terrified that the scene would leak unedited, so he personally oversaw the censoring of the master copy.

The scene during which Pam rests her head on Jim's shoulder after Dwight has stolen his sale and Jim smiles and says "not a bad day after all" came about when Greg Daniels spoke to the writers about wanting to have small, happy interactions between Jim and Pam and mentioned the head-on-shoulder idea, which B. J. Novak wrote into his script. Paul Lieberstein did not want to appear in the episode and did so assuming it would be a one-time event, but Kevin Reilly was impressed by his work and said the show should use him more, leading to the expansion of Lieberstein's work as Toby Flenderson. Two scenes that were cut involved Michael Scott responding to Mr. Brown's "HERO" acronym by creating an "INCEST" acronym, and Jim replacing Dwight's "Asian" card with "Dwight" and then having the other co-workers complain to a clueless Dwight about how annoying his behavior is.

== Web release ==
NBC webcast this episode on March 16, 2005, on MySpace to promote the show's then-upcoming premiere. This was NBC's first-ever online debut of a complete episode of a network series, and also included a trimmed-down webisode version of the episode for on-demand viewing on MySpace the following day. Greg Daniels later noted in an interview with Uproxx that cutting it to the required 12 minutes "was almost impossible" and that he had already "really sweated" during the process of getting the episode down to the 22 minutes for broadcast.

== Reception ==
=== Ratings ===
"Diversity Day" premiered on NBC on March 29, 2005. While the pilot episode garnered over eleven million viewers, the second episode lost over half its viewing audience from the previous episode. The episode received a 2.7/6 in the Nielsen ratings among people aged 18–49, meaning that 2.7 percent of all 18- to 49-year-olds viewed the episode and six percent of all 18- to 49-year-olds watching TV viewed it. The episode garnered 6.0 million viewers overall. The episode, airing after Scrubs, retained 90% of its lead-in 18–49 audience. In addition, "Diversity Day", along with the other first-season episodes of The Office, helped NBC score its highest-rated Tuesday night slot since February 1, 2005.

=== Reviews ===
Contrary to the lukewarm response to the pilot, "Diversity Day" earned positive reviews from television critics. Entertainment Weekly gave the episode positive reviews, stating that: "Think of the toss-off racism of the original, plopped into a PC-gone-wrong showcase that might be entitled The Accidental Bigot. As when the African-American diversity trainer introduces himself as Mr. Brown, and Scott assures him, 'I will not call you that.'" Ricky Gervais (the lead in the British series) stated that in comparison to the British version, "[i]t is as good. I love the fact that, apart from the first one, the scripts are all original. You've gone back to the blueprint of what the characters are and you've started from there, as opposed to copying anything." Rolling Stone magazine named the scene wherein Michael shows the office his diversity video the third greatest Moment from The Office. The article particularly praised Michael's line: "Abraham Lincoln once said, 'If you are a racist, I will attack you with the North.'"

Erik Adams of The A.V. Club awarded the episode a "B+" and felt that, as the show lost viewers in the first season, the stories got better, and that "Diversity Day" is an excellent example of this "unfortunate trend". He noted that the episode "would go on to be one of the series' defining episodes, an installment that put a more hopeful spin on the original Office's views on accepting the disparity between our dreams and our realities." However, Adams noted that Carell's character was still too aggressive for Michael Scott to be completely lovable, and that the second season episode "Sexual Harassment" would serve as "a gentler spiritual sequel" to this episode, featuring a similar premise, but with a softened Michael Scott. For his work on this episode, B. J. Novak was nominated for a Writers Guild of America Award for Best Screenplay – Episodic Comedy.

On August 22, 2021, the channel Comedy Central removed the episode from its reruns of the show. However it remains in rotation on Freeform and is still available to stream on Peacock, NBCUniversal's streaming service.
