= The Alliance (The Office) =

- The Office episode
- Episode no.: Season 1 Episode 4
- Directed by: Bryan Gordon
- Written by: Michael Schur
- Cinematography by: Randall Einhorn
- Editing by: Dave Rogers; Stuart Bass
- Production code: 1004
- Original air date: April 12, 2005

Guest appearances
- David Denman as Roy Anderson; Craig Robinson as Darryl Philbin

Episode chronology
← Previous "Health Care"	Next → "Basketball"
- The Office (American TV series) season 1

"The Alliance" is the fourth episode of the first season of the American comedy television series The Office. The episode aired on NBC in the United States on April 12, 2005. It was written by Michael Schur and directed by Bryan Gordon, marking their first credits for the show.

In this episode, paranoia takes over the members of the office as downsizing rumors swirl. Dwight Schrute (played by Rainn Wilson) forms a Survivor-esque alliance with Jim Halpert (John Krasinski) against the other employees—later adding Pam Beesly (Jenna Fischer). Meanwhile, Michael Scott (Steve Carell) arranges a morale-boosting birthday party for Meredith Palmer (Kate Flannery), although her birthday is more than a month away. Michael agonizes over writing the perfect greeting in her birthday card, and in the end, his joke falls flat, ruining the party and the employees' morale.

The episode was inspired by popular reality television shows, most notably Survivor. The first cut of the episode ran 37 minutes and the producers considered making the episode a two-parter, one focusing on the alliance and another focusing on Meredith's birthday party, but decided against the idea. "The Alliance" was viewed by an estimated 5.4 million viewers and received a 2.4/6% rating share among adults between the ages of 18 and 49. The episode received positive reviews from critics.

== Plot ==
Dwight Schrute feels threatened by the downsizing rumors at Dunder Mifflin, and forms an alliance with co-worker Jim Halpert. Jim agrees as a lark. He enlists Pam Beesly's help with a series of office pranks at the expense of Dwight.

Michael Scott tries to boost morale in the office by having an office birthday party for Meredith Palmer, even though her birthday is a month away. Michael agonizes over writing the perfect greeting in her birthday card. He resorts to a joke about the rumored downsizing, which causes everyone to worry about the downsizing, the very thing Michael launched the party in order to avoid. Oscar gets him to donate money to his nephew's cerebral palsy walk-a-thon. Not knowing what a walk-a-thon is, Michael pledges per mile what he intended as a one-time donation. Jim points out Michael's mistake to him, but Oscar refuses to let Michael revise or take back his pledge.

Jim giddily grabs Pam's hand as he explains that he has persuaded Dwight to go undercover at the Stamford branch. Pam's fiancé Roy Anderson catches this and sees it as Jim making a move on Pam. Jim explains to Roy that he was pranking Dwight and asks Dwight to back him up, but Dwight simply denies any involvement leaving Jim looking guilty. Dwight claims to the documentary crew that he proposed the alliance with Jim as a plan for this betrayal from the beginning.

== Production ==
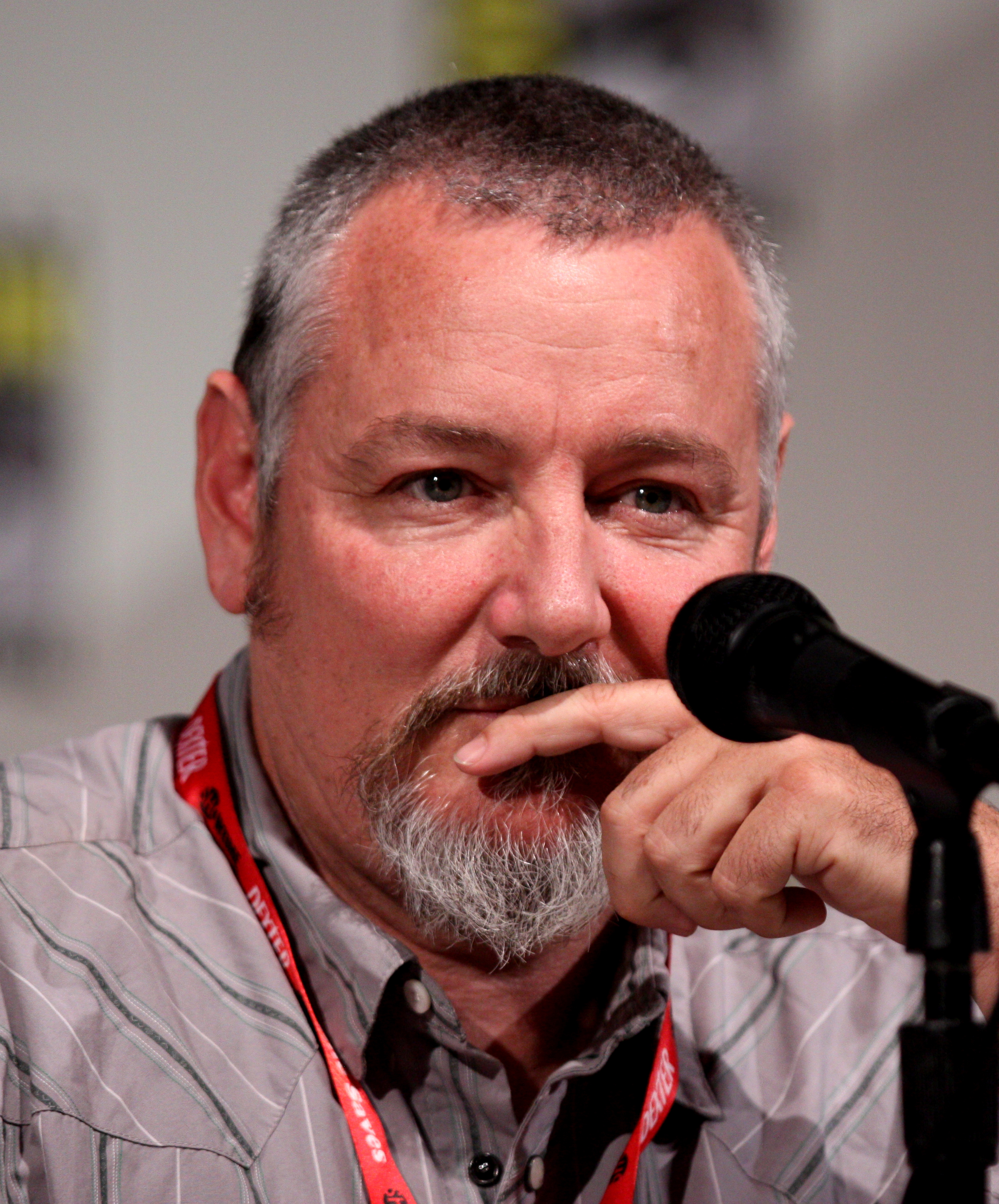
Randall Einhorn, a former Survivor crew member, shot the episode.

The episode was inspired by popular reality television shows, most notably Survivor. The "Can I trust Jim?..." line was a direct reference to the show and was a "last-second addition" according to Daniels. In addition, Randall Einhorn, the cameraman for the episode, was a cameraman for Survivor. When the episode was being written, many of the cast and crew feared that Oscar refusing to let Michael off the hook for his walk-a-thon pledge was a lapse from the realistic tone the show was aiming for, more resembling the unreasonable behavior seen on Curb Your Enthusiasm. Daniels defended the plausibility of Michael making the pledge, saying that since he was aware of the documentary crew filming him during that scene, he would be self-conscious to the extent that he might write the pledge without examining exactly what he was agreeing to. During the writing of the episode, Daniels made the writers spend actual time on the set, most notably in Michael's office. Mindy Kaling later noted that she "hated it".

The first cut of the episode ran 37 minutes long and the producers were tasked with cutting the footage down to 22 minutes. Executive producer Greg Daniels considered making the episode a two-parter, one focusing on the alliance and another focusing on Meredith's birthday party, but the appearance of party hats in the alliance scenes caused him to nix this idea. Because the episode had to be cut down due to time, several scenes were drastically cut. The footage of Steve Carell coming up with terrible card ideas was drastically reduced. During the party, Ryan talks to a different woman in the background of each scene. Although not much footage made it into the final episode, the producers thought this was a nice character touch for the new employee. The penultimate scenes of Michael telling several terrible jokes to Meredith were also trimmed down. The scene where Roy confronts Jim was shot ten different times, each in a different style, ranging from Roy slamming Jim into the wall to Roy asking Jim, "Hey, what are you doing?" Although the crew felt that the wall-slamming version was more dramatic, they realized that it caused the episode to go from a comedy to an "angry drama".

Several of the lines and scenes from the episode were improvised or ad-libbed by the cast. Jenna Fischer named the party planning scene her favorite scene and called it the "longest most horrible meeting of all time". On the commentary track for the episode, Fischer revealed that the scene was almost entirely ad-libbed. At one point, Phyllis Smith, who portrays Phyllis Margaret Vance (née Lapin), made a joke that made every one on set laugh, forcing production to halt for almost 45 minutes. Dwight's "gun show" joke was written by Rainn Wilson. Larry Wilmore later called the "gun show" scene his favorite. Wilmore later said of ab-libs, "part of the fun in writing a show like this is trying to write lines that sound like ad-libs." Daniels also praised the episode's lines, saying, "when you know the acting is really good, it all sounds like it's been improvised."

The scenes where Dwight climbs into a box almost did not make the episode. Mike Schur, who wrote the episode, feared that Dwight climbing into the box would not only make the episode "crazy broad", but also make the rest of the episode look boring by comparison. After shooting the scene, however, he described it as "the most natural thing in the world". Phil Shaw, the stunt man for The Office, did most of the work in the box. Schur described Dwight's emergence from the box as his "action hero" moment. Daniels likened the scene to the movie Alien. Editing the scene proved another hurdle, since the box had slightly shifted across the floor from take to take, making it difficult to piece together takes in a way that avoided obvious inconsistencies.

== Reception ==
=== Ratings ===
In its original American broadcast on April 12, 2005, "The Alliance" was viewed by an estimated 5.4 million viewers and received a 2.4/6% rating share among adults between the ages of 18 and 49. This means that it was seen by 2.4% of all 18–49 year-olds, and 6% of all 18–49 year-olds watching television at the time of the broadcast. The episode, airing after Scrubs, retained 100% of its lead-in 18–49 audience for the second week in a row.

=== Reviews ===
The episode received positive reviews from critics, with many praising the developing relationship between Pam and Jim. Travis Fickett from IGN praised the episode and compared Jim and Pam's relationship in the first season to that of the fourth, saying, "Jim and Pam simply work better before they were a couple. The fact that Roy can come between them here is fun – and reminds us that it was more interesting when something could still come between them!" In summary, he concluded that, "['The Alliance'] is one of the better early episodes of the show, and going out with Dwight talking to the camera – his hair dyed blonde – is genius and gives us (up to this point) the most perfect 'Dwight' moment of the show so far." Television critic Robin Pierson noted that in the episode, "The Jim and Pam relationship begins to take real shape here." He later called the moment when Roy nearly attacks Jim as "a much more 'real' moment that the rest of the episode." Furthermore, Pierson criticized the characterization of Dwight, noting that his actions were "stupidly naïve". Miss Alli from Television Without Pity gave the episode an A.

Erik Adams of The A.V. Club awarded the episode a "B−". He felt that the episode was "akin to a newborn deer working the wobbles out of its legs" and that "it's a milestone for The Office, in that it represents the first time an episode generated so much material it could’ve occupied a full hour of airtime". He felt that Michael's plot was funny, but had issues. He argued that the retooling of Michael's character made him a more likable character even when he was doing something inappropriate; in this episode, however, his behavior is too cringe-inducing. Adams praised the scene wherein Dwight emerged from the box, calling it one of "The Office's first great sight gags". Furthermore, he felt that the scene was symbolic, as it produced "a stronger, deadlier, better character".
