= Let Go (film) =

- Film poster
- Directed by: Brian Jett
- Written by: Brian Jett
- Produced by: Spencer R. Stouffer; Ed Asner
- Starring: David Denman; Gillian Jacobs; Simon Helberg; Maria Thayer; Alexandra Holden; Kali Hawk; Kevin Hart; Ed Asner
- Cinematography: Collin Brink; Eduardo Enrique Mayén
- Edited by: Harry Yoon
- Music by: Bobby Johnston
- Production company: Thousand Miles Entertainment
- Release dates: October 25, 2011 (Austin Film Festival); August 21, 2012 (United States)
- Running time: 95 minutes
- Country: United States
- Language: English

Let Go is a 2011 comedy-drama film starring David Denman, Gillian Jacobs, Kevin Hart, and Ed Asner. It was written and directed by Brian Jett.

== Plot ==
The film centers around the interlocking lives of a bored parole officer and three ex-convicts recently placed under his supervision.

== Cast ==
- David Denman as Walter Dishman
- Gillian Jacobs as Darla DeMint
- Kevin Hart as Kris Styles
- Ed Asner as Artie Satz
- Simon Helberg as Frank
- Maria Thayer as Beth
- Alexandra Holden as Kelly
- Kali Hawk as Angela
- Ogy Durham as Vanessa

== Production ==
It was filmed in Los Angeles, shot in just 24 days. The cast, which includes Denman from The Office and Jacobs from Community, worked for SAG independent film scale. Writer-director Brian Jett cited influences including Dustin Hoffman drama Straight Time.

== Release ==
The film was released October 25, 2011 at the Austin Film Festival, October 31, 2011, at the Savannah International Film Festival before being released in the United States on August 21, 2012.

== Critical response ==
CultureMap considered it a flop: they criticised it for poor technical quality, citing bad lighting, sound, and cinematography, and also felt the script did not give a talented cast much to do.

Magdalena Bresson praised the performances from a variety of actors known for TV comedy, and the film's visual qualities, particularly its use of color.
