= Basketball (The Office) =

- The Office episode
- Michael Scott in the warehouse, wearing his special basketball uniform holding a ball.
- Episode no.: Season 1 Episode 5
- Directed by: Greg Daniels
- Written by: Greg Daniels
- Cinematography by: Randall Einhorn
- Editing by: Dave Rogers
- Production code: 1005
- Original air date: April 19, 2005

Guest appearances
- David Denman as Roy Anderson; Craig Robinson as Darryl Philbin; Patrice O'Neal as Lonny Collins

Episode chronology
← Previous "The Alliance"	Next → "Hot Girl"
- The Office (American TV series) season 1

"Basketball" is the fifth and penultimate episode of the first season of the American comedy television series The Office. The episode aired on NBC in the United States on April 19, 2005. The episode was written and directed by producer Greg Daniels, marking both his first solo writing credit and first directing credit for the series. This episode also marks the first appearance of comedian Patrice O'Neal.

In this episode, Michael Scott (played by Steve Carell) and the office staff take on the workers in the warehouse in a basketball game. The episode was inspired by a deleted scene from the first episode where Michael talks about a pick-up basketball game. For two days, the cast of The Office played actual basketball games, which were then spliced together to give the effect of one continuous game. Several lines from the episode became fans and cast favorites. "Basketball" was viewed by an estimated 5.0 million viewers and received a 2.4/6% rating share among adults between the ages of 18 and 49. The episode received positive reviews from critics.

== Synopsis ==
The office staff are pitted against the warehouse in a game of basketball, with the losers having to work on Saturday. Michael Scott picks Jim Halpert, Ryan Howard, and Stanley Hudson, the last of whom he believes possesses significant basketball skills based on a racial stereotype. He also reluctantly picks Dwight Schrute and Phyllis Lapin, but refuses to pick Oscar Martinez or Kevin Malone. Pam Beesly has plans for an outing on the lake with her fiance Roy Anderson Saturday, provided the warehouse team wins. Jim half-jokingly proposes to Pam that if the office team wins, he will claim Roy's Saturday date with her.

The game begins and Stanley proves to be a horrible player. Furthermore, Michael cannot make a shot, nor is he a fan of passing or defending. Upon gaining possession of the ball, Michael fools around and teases his opponents, which results in Roy snatching the ball and scoring against Michael's team. He blames the scoring on his teammates' ineptitude. Jim switches with Michael on defense and defends Roy. Taking his wager with Pam seriously, Jim plays aggressively against Roy and shows his prowess at the game, with Pam looking on. Michael is accidentally hit in the face and claims it is a "flagrant personal intentional foul". He stops the game and declares the office winners since they were winning when the foul occurred. The warehouse finds the call unfair and Michael caves under pressure, conceding the victory to the warehouse staff. As everybody returns to work, Kevin demonstrates his excellent shooting skills.

Michael, faced with taking the blame for their loss, tells the office staff that they do not have to come in on Saturday either. However, his justification does little to calm them: "Like coming in an extra day is going to prevent us from being downsized."

== Production ==
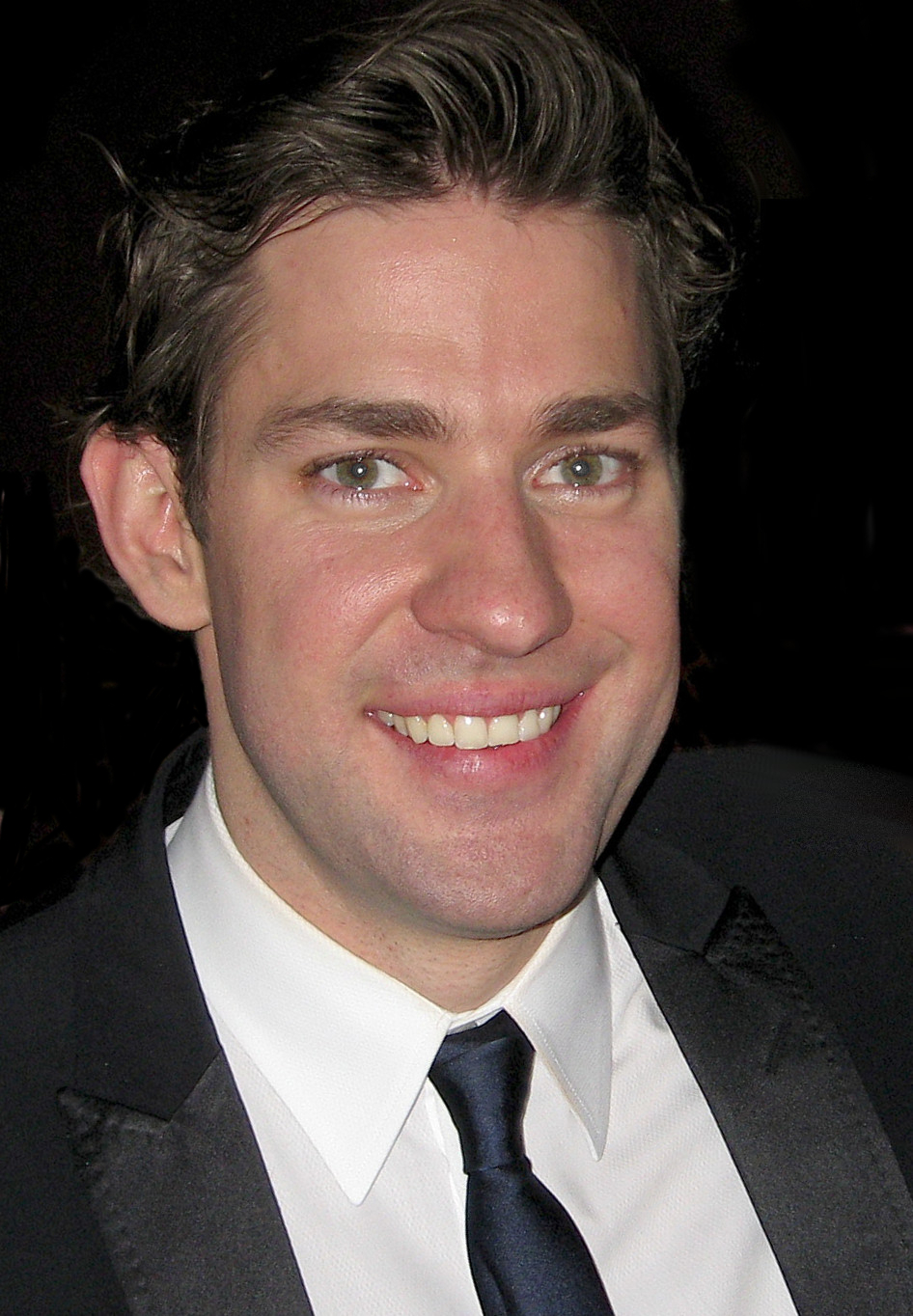
John Krasinski, a former high school basketball star, performed all his own stunts in the episode.

"Basketball" was written and directed by producer Greg Daniels. Although he wrote the episode, Daniels was not originally scheduled to direct "Basketball". Rainn Wilson remarked that he really pushed for Daniels to direct the episode. John Krasinski applauded Daniels for being the first writer to "take [the characters] out of the office". Daniels later said that his favorite shot from the episode was when Michael takes Ryan on a tour of the warehouse because "you got to see the whole basketball [set]". The editors' cut for the episode was 40 minutes long. During the commentary for the episode, Steve Carell argued that the American version of The Office was more difficult to shoot because the British version was 29 minutes long, whereas the American version could only be 22 minutes.

The inspiration for the episode was a deleted scene from the pilot episode where Michael talks about a pick-up basketball game. During filming, the cast and crew were filmed playing real basketball games for two days, with three crew members spraying fake sweat on their faces, hair, and clothes. The takes were then spliced together to make it appear as if only one game had taken place. NBC was worried about the episode because several of their other pilots had done basketball episodes. The network put a lot of pressure on the cast and crew to make the episode appear "as realistic as it could be". Donald Lee Harris designed the warehouse set, which Krasinski described as "amazing" and "detailed".

Several of the actors had basketball experience, such as Krasinski, who played for his high school team. Brian Baumgartner, who portrays Kevin, succeeded in making 14 consecutive free-throw shots, of which several were included in the final footage. Steve Carell later said of his basketball skills, "The thing about looking like you're bad at basketball is, it's like anything else, you have to be incredibly good in order to look bad [...] but that's not the case with me and basketball. I just was bad." However, Carell said that he would "kick ass" at a hockey episode.

"Basketball" contained several lines that became cast favorites. Two of Michael's lines, "The hand strikes and gives a flower" and "Blessed be those who sit and wait" were described by Wilson as Confucian and biblical, respectively. Michael's line "Try not to be too gay on the court" was improvised by Carell and Krasinski's reaction was real. However, Phyllis Smith's reaction to Michael's disgust at the idea of her being a cheerleader was acted.

== Reception ==
=== Ratings ===
In its original American broadcast on April 19, 2005, "Basketball" was viewed by an estimated 5.0 million viewers and received a 2.4/6% rating share among adults between the ages of 18 and 49. This means that it was seen by 2.4% of all 18- to 49-year-olds, and 6% of all 18- to 49-year-olds watching television at the time of the broadcast. The episode, airing after Scrubs, retained 92 percent of its lead-in audience.

=== Reviews ===
The episode received moderately positive reviews from critics. Travis Fickett from IGN retroactively gave the episode a 7.5 out of 10, signifying a "good" episode. Fickett commented that "Basketball" was stylistically different from most of the other episodes in the fledgling series, pointing to its lack of a sub-plot and its characterization of Michael Scott. Fickett, when discussing the latter, singled out the moment wherein Michael hurts Phyllis' feelings by telling her she can't play basketball, writing, "The moment is played mostly straight–and it does feel more realistic and uncomfortable and in that way, the show leans more towards the feel of the UK series. It's a great moment, but feels like a different show." Overall, he wrote that, "There is still quite a bit of funny stuff [in 'Basketball'], but in many ways, this episode suggests what the show would have been like had it taken a slightly different direction in terms of tone and style." Miss Alli from Television Without Pity gave the episode an "A−". Jenna Mullins from E! News referred to "Basketball" as her "all-time favorite episode of The Office" in an article about Steve Carell's last episode of the series.

Not all reviews were as positive, however. Erik Adams of The A.V. Club awarded the episode a "C+" and highly criticized the characterization of Michael. Largely, he felt that Michael's antics made him out to be a jerk because the series has not worked at showing that he truly "isn't a complete asshole". Adams noted that Michael "could truly force Darryl and his staff to work on Saturdays, and he truly could fire them for winning the basketball game. But that would be an outrageous abuse of legitimate power, which isn't funny." Ultimately he argued that the basketball scenes went on for too long; he said the "episode's original cut ran too long to air, and it's obvious where the basketball scenes boxed out other threads of the episode".
