= Health Care (The Office) =

- The Office episode
- Episode no.: Season 1 Episode 3
- Directed by: Ken Whittingham
- Written by: Paul Lieberstein
- Cinematography by: Randall Einhorn
- Editing by: Stuart Bass; Dave Rogers
- Production code: 1006
- Original air date: April 5, 2005

Guest appearance
- Melora Hardin as Jan Levinson

Episode chronology
← Previous "Diversity Day"	Next → "The Alliance"
- The Office (American TV series) season 1

"Health Care" is the third episode of the first season of the American comedy television series The Office. Written by Paul Lieberstein, who also acts in the show as Toby Flenderson, and directed by Ken Whittingham, the episode first aired in the United States on April 5, 2005, on NBC.

In this episode, Michael (played by Steve Carell) is tasked with choosing a new and inexpensive health care plan. He immediately hands it off to enthusiastic volunteer Dwight (Rainn Wilson). Dwight ruthlessly cuts nearly all benefits in the new plan, angering the rest of the office staff. Meanwhile, Pam (Jenna Fischer) and Jim (John Krasinski) make up fake diseases, much to Dwight's chagrin. In an attempt to appease them, Michael promises the entire office a surprise and then spends the rest of the day scrambling to come through with his promise. The employees wait for Michael's surprise, which he awkwardly never delivers.

The episode received positive reviews from television critics. Jenna Fischer later called "Health Care" her favorite season one episode. The episode received a 2.9/7 in the Nielsen ratings among people aged 18–49 and garnered 5.8 million viewers overall. In addition, the episode retained 100% of its lead-in 18–49 audience and ranked, along with the other first-season episodes of The Office, as NBC's highest-rated Tuesday night program since February 1, 2005.

== Plot ==
Jan Levinson-Gould tasks Michael Scott with picking a new healthcare plan for the office, dictating that he must choose a provider and pick the cheapest plan. Unwilling to reveal the bad news that healthcare benefits will be cut to the employees, Michael tasks Jim Halpert with handling the healthcare decision, but Jim instead recommends Dwight Schrute, who eagerly accepts the assignment. To work on the plan, Michael allows Dwight to use the conference room as a temporary workspace, though Dwight lets the power go to his head and refers to his workspace as an office.

Dwight picks a very cheap plan with little coverage, no benefits, and a large deductible. Not willing to confront the disgruntled employees, Michael hides out in his office claiming he is very busy. When the other employees confront him about Dwight's plan, he chastises Dwight and tries to liven the employees' spirits by bluffing that he has a big surprise prepared for them. In another desperate attempt to avoid questions, Michael leaves the office and tries to come up with a surprise.

Dwight distributes forms that ask employees to list any ailments or illnesses they may have so that it may be covered. Jim and Pam Beesly conjure up fake diseases that frustrate Dwight. Jim later locks Dwight in his "workspace" as Michael, having failed to procure a better surprise, returns with ice cream sandwiches. While trapped in the conference room, Dwight calls Jan, attempting to get Jim fired, but Jan is outraged that Michael left the office and left Dwight in charge of the healthcare plan. Dwight gathers the employees in the conference room, forcing them to publicly reveal their ailments.

At the end of the day, the employees confront Michael about the surprise, but Michael's awkward stalling tactics cause them to finally realize there is no surprise, and they leave. With only him and Dwight left in the office, Dwight belatedly tells Michael that Jan said to call her.

== Production ==
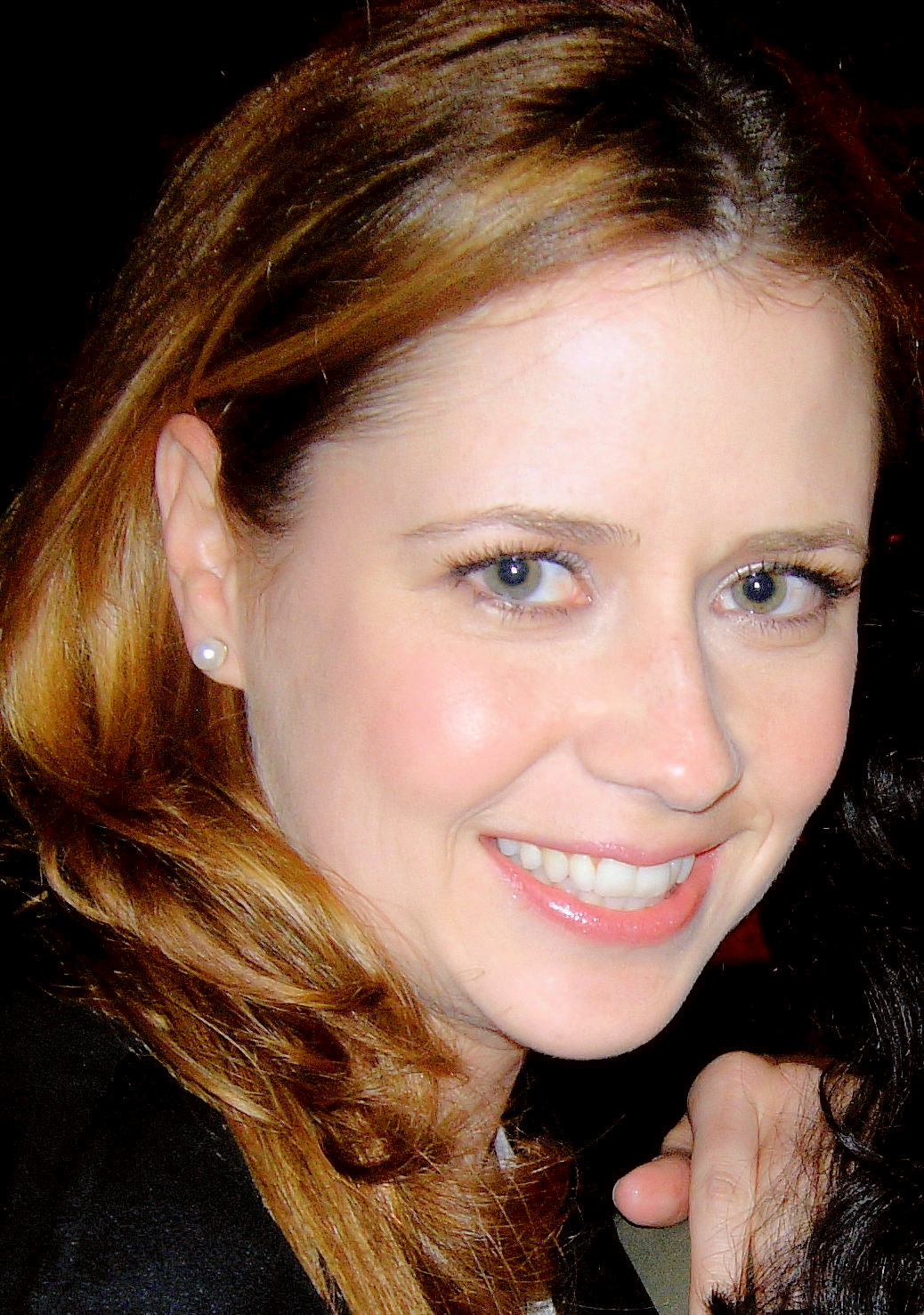
In an interview with TV Guide, Jenna Fischer called "Health Care" her favorite episode of season one.

"Health Care" marked the first episode written by writer/actor Paul Lieberstein, who would go on to write several other episodes. It also marked the first episode directed by Ken Whittingham, who would go on to direct several other episodes.

Jenna Fischer stated that "Health Care" was her favorite episode of season one. Fischer went on to say that "We laughed a lot while making this episode. Particularly during the scene where Dwight confronts everyone in the office about who has been writing fake diseases on their health forms. Rainn Wilson kept improvising new fake diseases, and we didn't know what he would say next." Fischer notes that several of the scenes that involved laughing were not scripted and were in fact the cast's genuine reaction to Wilson's fake diseases. The episode was rebroadcast on March 29, 2007, as part of a "Human resources Nightmares" marathon hosted by Paul Lieberstein. Lieberstein's character Toby Flenderson is the Human Resources Representative for the Scranton, Pennsylvania branch of the Dunder Mifflin paper company, where The Office is set. "Health Care" was one of two first-season episodes, the other being "Hot Girl", to not contain commentary by members of the cast and crew on the season DVD.

== Reception ==
=== Ratings ===
"Health Care" premiered on NBC on April 5, 2005. The episode received a 2.9/7 in the Nielsen ratings among people aged 18–49, meaning that 2.9 percent of all 18- to 49-year-olds viewed the episode and seven percent of all 18- to 49-year-olds watching TV viewed it. The episode garnered 5.8 million viewers overall. The episode, airing after Scrubs, retained 100% of its lead-in 18–49 audience. In addition, "Health Care", along with the other first-season episodes of The Office helped NBC score its highest-rated Tuesday night slot since February 1, 2005.

=== Reviews ===
Critical reception to "Health Care" was largely positive. Erik Adams of The A.V. Club awarded the episode a "B+", and felt that the episode helped to expand upon Dwight's character, noting that "the pieces are falling into place" for Dwight to become the show's breakout character. Furthermore, he applauded the fact that the episode was based on an episode of the original BBC series, but that it did not create an exact copy, but rather used the concept as a template to create something new and original.

In a review by DVD Verdict, Mike Pinsky stated that "Turning the third episode over to such a character, when Michael passes off responsibility for picking a corporate health care plan to Dwight, is meant to draw laughs out of his megalomania. But it just is not that funny." Travis Fickett from IGN wrote positively of the episode, giving it a 7.9/10 "good" rating. He noted that "there's something Stephen King about Dwight that creates an underlying layer of menace" and that the episode is "an early incarnation of [The Office's] early days, its original "paradigm" – and arguably its strongest." IGN later placed Jim and Pam's prank of creating fake diseases as ninth in its "Top Ten Moments from The Office". Television Without Pity awarded the episode an A rating.
