= Larry Wilmore =

American comedian, writer, producer, and actor (born 1961)

- Wilmore in 2026
- Born: Elister Larry Wilmore III; October 30, 1961 (age 65); Los Angeles, California U.S.
- Spouse: Leilani Jones (m. 1995; div. 2015)
- Children: 2

Comedy career
- Years active: 1983–present
- Medium: Stand-up; television; film; podcast; books
- Genres: Observational comedy; black comedy; sketch comedy; satire
- Subjects: American politics; African-American culture; popular culture; current events; racism; religion
- Website: thelarrywilmore.com

Elister Larry Wilmore III (born October 30, 1961) is an American comedian, writer, producer, and actor. He served as the "Senior Black Correspondent" on The Daily Show from 2006 to 2014, and hosted The Nightly Show with Larry Wilmore in 2015 and 2016. He is also the creator of the sitcom The Bernie Mac Show. He was an executive producer for the ABC television series Black-ish, and co-created the HBO television series Insecure with Issa Rae. From 2017 to 2025, he hosted a podcast, Black on the Air, where he discussed current events and interviews guests. He was also the host of the talk show Wilmore.

== Early life and education ==
Wilmore was born October 30, 1961, in Los Angeles to Betty and Larry Wilmore, a doctor. He grew up Catholic in suburban Pomona and his family is from Evanston, Illinois. He is the third of six children and his late younger brother Marc was also a television writer, actor, and producer.

As a child, Wilmore found interest in topics including science, magic, science-fiction and fantasy, all of which have shaped the evolution of his performance. In an NPR interview, he said he was a nerd. "It used to be that the black comic figure had to have this bravado and always showed strength... now there's a comic figure where it's ok to just be a nerd and be black." Wilmore graduated from Damien High School in La Verne, California, in 1979. He studied theater at California State Polytechnic University, Pomona in Pomona, but dropped out to pursue acting and stand-up comedy.

== Career ==
Beginning in the 1980s, Wilmore appeared in several small film and television roles, including a recurring role as a police officer on The Facts of Life. In the early to mid-1990s, he was on the writing staff of the talk show Into the Night With Rick Dees, the sketch comedy show In Living Color (his younger brother Marc was also a writer with In Living Color; unlike Larry, he became a cast member), and the sitcom Sister, Sister, where Larry Wilmore portrayed a bus driver in an episode. He went on to be a writer and producer on a series of black sitcoms, including The Fresh Prince of Bel-Air and The Jamie Foxx Show.

In 1999, Wilmore co-created the animated comedy The PJs with Eddie Murphy and was the executive producer until its conclusion in 2001. He then created and produced The Bernie Mac Show, and won an Emmy for writing the pilot episode. He created and produced Whoopi, with Whoopi Goldberg. From 2005 to 2007 he was a consulting producer for The Office, and appeared in the "Diversity Day" episode as Mr. Brown, a diversity consultant.

In 2006, Wilmore began appearing regularly on Comedy Central's The Daily Show, where he was billed as the "Senior Black Correspondent" or a derivative form of the title, such as the "Senior Executive Commander-in-Chief Who Happens To Be Black Correspondent" after the election of Barack Obama. Wilmore's work on the show frequently centered on humorous observations of the Black experience in American society. He originated the titular phrase I'd Rather We Got Casinos in a January 2007 Daily Show appearance. In January 2009, Hyperion published Wilmore's I'd Rather We Got Casinos: And Other Black Thoughts, a political humor book described by Booklist as being "a faux collection of articles, essays, radio transcripts, and letters exploring the more ludicrous angles on race."

Wilmore has continued occasional acting appearances, including a role as a minister in I Love You, Man (2009) and a supporting role in Dinner for Schmucks (2010). In 2011, He began a recurring role on the ABC comedy Happy Endings, where he played Mr. Forristal, Brad (Damon Wayans Jr.)'s uptight boss. In 2012, he starred in the Showtime special Race, Religion and Sex, shot in Salt Lake City, Utah.

On April 30, 2016, Wilmore was the headliner at the White House Correspondents' Association Dinner. He came under fire for using the word "nigga" to refer to President Barack Obama saying "Barry, you did it my nigga." Wilmore defended his actions telling Al Sharpton, "I wanted to make a statement more than a joke... I really wanted to explain the historical implications of the Obama presidency from my point of view." In May 2017, Wilmore began hosting the podcast Larry Wilmore: Black on the Air as part of The Ringer podcast network, headed by Bill Simmons. Time ranked it in the top five of its list of 10 Best podcast of 2017.

=== The Nightly Show with Larry Wilmore ===
On January 19, 2015, Wilmore began hosting The Nightly Show with Larry Wilmore, a late night panel talk show which aired on Comedy Central. It was a spin-off of The Daily Show, and replaced The Colbert Report in the network's 11:30pm timeslot. It was produced by Jon Stewart's production company Busboy Productions. On August 15, 2016, Comedy Central announced that Wilmore's show had been canceled, and the show ended August 18, 2016, with a total of 259 episodes.

=== Wilmore ===
He briefly hosted his own limited series late-night talk show on Peacock titled Wilmore.

== Influences ==
Wilmore has cited Johnny Carson, Richard Pryor, Eddie Murphy and Jon Stewart as being comedy influences. Wilmore said that when he needs inspiration, he "observe[s] people. I ride the subway, sit in a coffee shop. There's nothing funnier than real human behavior."

== Personal life ==
Wilmore and actress Leilani Jones were married for 20 years; they have two children, John and Lauren. Wilmore and Jones divorced in 2015. He lived in San Marino, California, with his family until moving to New York City to work on The Nightly Show with Larry Wilmore.

== Filmography ==
Year	Title	Role	Notes
1983	Good-bye, Cruel World	Sergeant, Thug	
1990	The Ghost Writer	The Paramedic	TV movie
2005; 2006	The Office	Al Brown	2 episodes: "Diversity Day", "Gay Witch Hunt"
2009	I Love You, Man	Minister	
2010	Dinner for Schmucks	Williams	
2012	Vamps	Professor Quincy	
2014	Date and Switch	Mr. Vernon	
2019	The Laundromat	Jeff	
2022	Jerry & Marge Go Large	Steve	
TBA	One Attempt Remaining †	TBA	Filming

== Television ==
=== As showrunner ===
Year	Title	Notes
1999–2001	The PJs	43 episodes; co-creator, writer, executive producer
2001–2003	The Bernie Mac Show	creator 44 episodes; writer, director, executive producer
2016	Insecure	co-creator 8 episodes; writer, executive producer

=== As performer ===
Year	Title	Role	Notes
1983	The Facts of Life	Officer Ziaukus	2 episodes
1986	Sledge Hammer!	Mail Man, Terrorist #3	2 episodes
1990	Star Search	Self	1 episode
1992	In Living Color	Various	2 episodes
1994	Sister, Sister	Bus Driver	2 episodes
1999	The PJs	Various voices	2 episodes
2005–2007	The Office	Mr. Brown	2 episodes
2006–2014	The Daily Show	Himself (senior black correspondent)	78 episodes
2006–2007	Help Me Help You	Larry, Jimmy	2 episodes
2008	How I Met Your Mother	Dr. Greer	Episode: "Everything Must Go"
2009–2010	Accidentally on Purpose	Dr. Roland	5 episodes
2011	Traffic Light	Harvey	2 episodes
2011	Love Bites	The Boss	Episode: "Firsts"
2011–2012	Happy Endings	Mr. Forristal	2 episodes
2012	Bullet in the Face	Racken's Mafiosi #1	Episode: "The World Stage"
2012	Race, Religion and Sex	Himself	Stand-up special
2013	Malibu Country	Mr. Clark	2 episodes
2013	NTSF:SD:SUV::	Historian	Episode: "A Hard Drive to Swallow"
2013	Instant Mom	Franklin Turner	Episode: "The Gift of the Maggies"
2014	Playing House	Dr. Ullman	Episode: "37 Weeks"
2014–2017	Penn Zero: Part-Time Hero	Principal Larry (voice)	Main role
2015–2016	The Nightly Show with Larry Wilmore	Himself (host)	259 episodes; also writer, executive producer
2016	White House Correspondents' Dinner	Himself (host)	TV special
2017	Difficult People	Larry Wilmore	Episode: "Passover Bump"
2017	The Mayor	Vern	Episode: "The Filibuster"
2020	Upload	Mr. Whitbridge	2 episodes
2020	Wilmore	Himself (host)	
2026	Life, Larry and the Pursuit of Unhappiness	Barney	Episode: "Farewell"

=== As crew member ===
Year	Title	Notes
1990–1991	Into the Night	6 episodes; writer
1991–1993	In Living Color	58 episodes; writer
1994–1995	Sister, Sister	5 episodes; writer
1995–1996	The Fresh Prince of Bel-Air	24 episodes; co-producer, writer
1996–1997	The Jamie Foxx Show	21 episodes; writer, supervising producer
1997–1998	Teen Angel	17 episodes; writer, consulting producer
2003–2004	Whoopi	22 episodes; writer, executive producer
2005–2007	The Office	50 episodes; writer, consulting producer
2011	Love Bites	8 episodes; writer, consulting producer
2014–2015	Black-ish	24 episodes; executive producer
2018–2024	Grown-ish	105 episodes; writer, co-creator

== Published works ==
- Wilmore, Larry (2009). I'd Rather We Got Casinos: And Other Black Thoughts. Hachette Book Group. ISBN 978-1-4013-0955-8.

== Awards and nominations ==
Year	Award	Category	Work	Result
1992	Primetime Emmy Award	Outstanding Individual Achievement in Writing in a Variety or Music Program	In Living Color	Nominated
1996	Nickelodeon Kids' Choice Award	Favorite TV Show	The Fresh Prince of Bel-Air	Nominated
1996	NAACP Image Award	Outstanding Comedy Series	The Fresh Prince of Bel-Air	Nominated
1997	NAACP Image Award	Outstanding Comedy Series	The Fresh Prince of Bel-Air	Nominated
1999	NAACP Image Award	Outstanding Comedy Series	The Jamie Foxx Show	Nominated
1999	Primetime Emmy Award	Outstanding Animated Program	The PJs: He's Gotta Have It	Nominated
2001	Peabody Award		The Bernie Mac Show	Won
2001	NAACP Image Award	Outstanding Comedy Series	The Jamie Foxx Show	Nominated
2002	NAACP Image Award	Outstanding Comedy Series	The Bernie Mac Show	Nominated
2002	TCA Award	Outstanding Achievement in Comedy	The Bernie Mac Show	Won
2002	Teen Choice Award	Choice Comedy Series	The Bernie Mac Show	Nominated
2002	Teen Choice Award	Choice TV Breakout Show	The Bernie Mac Show	Won
2002	Primetime Emmy Award	Outstanding Writing for a Comedy Series	The Bernie Mac Show: Pilot	Won
2003	Writers Guild of America Award	Episodic Comedy	The Bernie Mac Show	Nominated
2003	Young Artist Award	Best Family Television Series (Comedy or Drama)	The Bernie Mac Show	Nominated
2003	NAACP Image Award	Outstanding Comedy Series	The Bernie Mac Show	Won
2003	Humanitas Prize	30 Minute Network or Syndicated Television	The Bernie Mac Show	Won
2003	Teen Choice Award	Choice Comedy Series	The Bernie Mac Show	Nominated
2003	Satellite Award	Best Television Series – Musical or Comedy	The Bernie Mac Show	Won
2004	NAACP Image Award	Outstanding Comedy Series	Whoopi	Nominated
2006	Writers Guild of America Award	Comedy Series	The Office	Nominated
2006	Writers Guild of America Award	New Series	The Office	Nominated
2008	Writers Guild of America Award	Comedy Series	The Office	Nominated
2016	NAACP Image Award	Outstanding Talk Series	The Nightly Show with Larry Wilmore	Nominated
2016	NAACP Image Award	Outstanding Host in a News, Talk, Reality, or Variety (Series or Special)	The Nightly Show with Larry Wilmore	Nominated
2017	NAACP Image Award	Outstanding Comedy Series	Insecure	Nominated
2017	NAACP Image Award	Outstanding Writing in a Comedy Series	Insecure	Nominated
2017	MTV Movie & TV Awards	Show of the Year	Insecure	Nominated
2018	Austin Film Festival	Extraordinary Contribution to Television	N/A	Won
