= Pilot (The Office) =

- The Office episode
- The first scene, in which salesman Jim Halpert (John Krasinski) and manager Michael Scott (Steve Carell) talk over the former's financial quarterlies
- Episode no.: Season 1 Episode 1
- Directed by: Ken Kwapis
- Story by: Ricky Gervais; Stephen Merchant
- Teleplay by: Ricky Gervais; Stephen Merchant; Greg Daniels
- Cinematography by: Peter Smokler
- Editing by: Kathryn Himoff
- Production code: 1001
- Original air date: March 24, 2005

Guest appearances
- Melora Hardin as Jan Levinson; David Denman as Roy Anderson

Episode chronology
← Previous —	Next → "Diversity Day"
- The Office (American TV series) season 1

"Pilot" (alternatively titled "The Office: An American Workplace") is the first episode of the first season of the American comedy television series The Office. The episode premiered in the United States on NBC on March 24, 2005. The episode's teleplay was adapted by Greg Daniels from the original script of the first episode of the British version written by Ricky Gervais and Stephen Merchant. "Pilot" was directed by Ken Kwapis.

In this episode, a documentary crew arrives at the Scranton, Pennsylvania offices of Dunder Mifflin to observe the employees and learn about modern management. Manager Michael Scott (Steve Carell) tries to paint a happy picture in the face of potential downsizing from corporate. The office also gets new employee Ryan Howard (B. J. Novak) as a temporary worker, while Jim Halpert (John Krasinski) pranks antagonist Dwight Schrute (Rainn Wilson).

"Pilot" debuted The Office as a mid-season replacement for the 2004–05 season. The episode was primarily adapted from the first episode of the British series, although it was partially re-scripted in an attempt to "Americanize" the new show. Although the episode was a ratings success, receiving a 5.0/13 in the Nielsen ratings among people aged 18–49, and garnering 11.2 million viewers overall, the episode received mixed reviews, with many critics criticizing it as a complete copy of the original.

== Plot ==
The episode introduces Michael Scott, the regional manager at the Scranton branch of Dunder Mifflin, a distribution company dealing in paper products that is currently under threat of facing downsizing. The news is delivered to him by the Vice President of Northeast Sales, Jan Levinson-Gould, who, along with the other employees, can barely tolerate Michael's foolish antics.

Also introduced are a few of the other workers in the office, including Dwight Schrute, a socially awkward salesman and part-time, volunteer sheriff's deputy; Jim Halpert, another salesman who enjoys playing pranks on Dwight; Pam Beesly, the receptionist on whom Jim harbors an obvious crush; and Ryan Howard, a temporary worker.

== Production ==
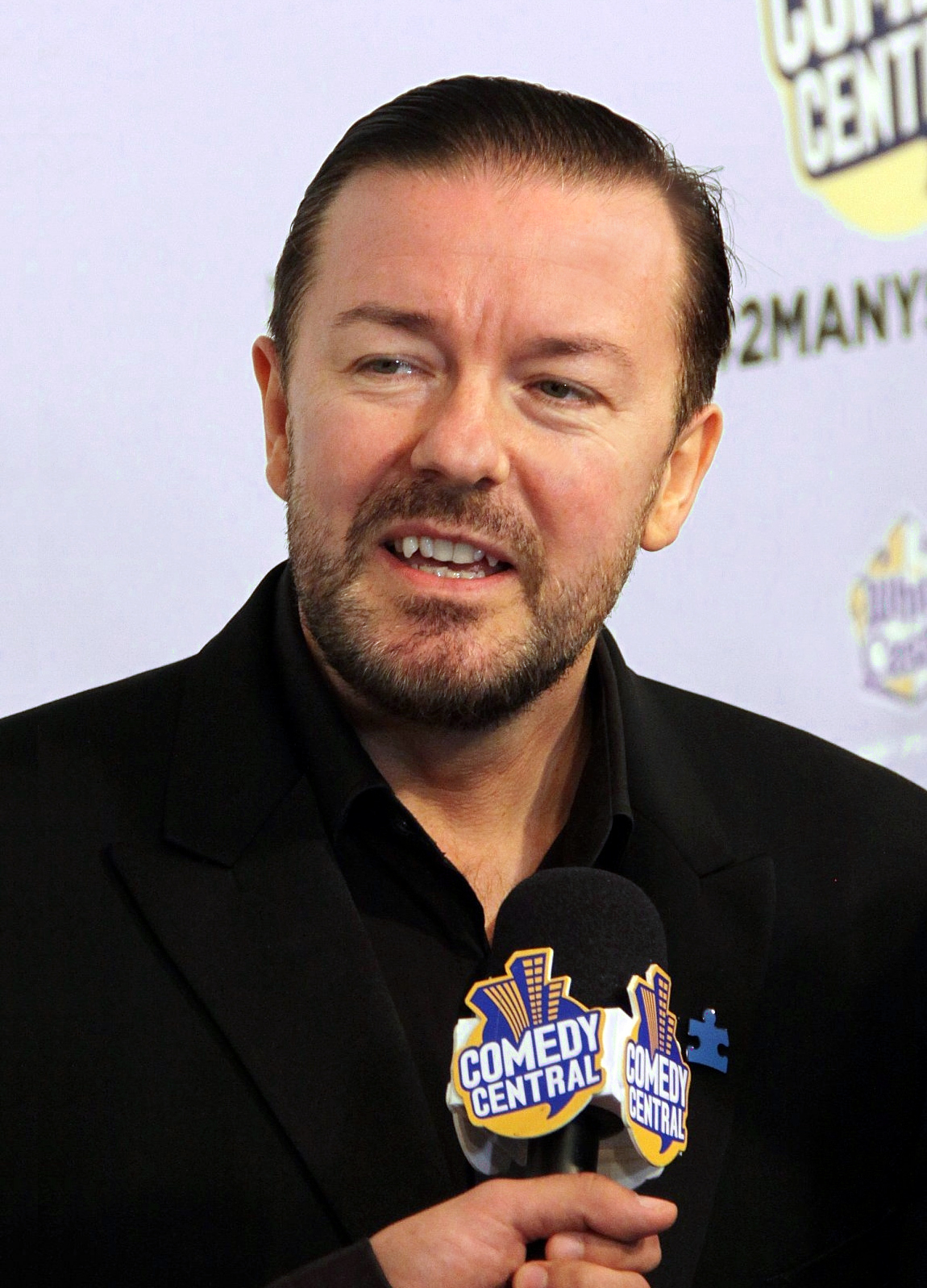
"Pilot" was based on the original first episode of the British version of The Office, created by Ricky Gervais (pictured) and Stephen Merchant.

The episode debuted the series as a mid-season replacement for the 2004–05 season. The pilot is a direct adaptation of the first episode of the British version. Daniels had decided to go through this route because "completely starting from scratch would be a very risky thing to do" due to the show being an adaptation. Although the episode was primarily adapted from the first episode of the British series, it was partially re-scripted in an attempt to "Americanize" it. Jokes such as Dwight's stapler being put in Jell-O by Jim were transferred verbatim from the original series, while others were only slightly changed. Although later reshot, a scene in which Jim tapes pencils to his desk was originally filmed as a parallel to a scene in the British version, in which Tim Canterbury stacks up cardboard boxes in front of Gareth Keenan to restrict Keenan's view of Canterbury. "Pilot" was filmed almost six months prior to beginning of filming on the second episode of the season, "Diversity Day". The Office used no laugh tracks in the "Pilot", wanting its "deadpan" and "absurd" humor to fully come across. Production for this episode took place on February 18, 2004.

=== Casting ===
NBC programmer Kevin Reilly originally suggested Paul Giamatti to producer Ben Silverman for the role of Michael Scott, but the actor declined. Martin Short, Hank Azaria and Bob Odenkirk were also reported to be interested. In January 2004, Variety reported Steve Carell, of the popular Comedy Central program The Daily Show with Jon Stewart, was in talks to play the role. At the time, he was already committed to another NBC mid-season replacement comedy, Come to Papa, but the series was quickly canceled, leaving him fully committed to The Office. Carell later stated he had only seen about half of the original pilot episode of the British series before he auditioned. He did not continue watching for fear that he would start copying Gervais' characterizations. Rainn Wilson, who was cast as the power-hungry sycophant Dwight Schrute, watched every episode of the series before he auditioned. Wilson had originally auditioned for Michael, a performance he described as a "terrible Ricky Gervais impersonation"; however, the casting directors liked his audition as Dwight much more and hired him for the role.

John Krasinski and Jenna Fischer were virtual unknowns before being cast in their respective roles as Jim and Pam, the central love interests. Krasinski had attended school with, and was a friend of B. J. Novak. Krasinski recalled accidentally insulting Greg Daniels while waiting to audition for the series, telling him, "I hope [the show's developers] don't screw this up." Daniels then introduced himself and told Krasinski who he was. Fischer prepared for her audition by looking as boring as possible, creating the original Pam hairstyle. In an interview on NPR's Fresh Air, Fischer recalled the last stages of the audition process for Pam and Jim, with the producers partnering the different potential Pams and Jims (four of each) together to gauge their chemistry. When Fischer finished her scene with Krasinski, he told her that she was his favorite Pam, to which she reciprocated that he was her favorite Jim. Many actors originally filmed as extras in this episode would go on to become supporting cast members in later episodes, and the two women wearing blue sweaters towards the back of the room at the staff meeting scene were actual accountants that worked on the production staff.

== Reception ==
=== Ratings ===
"Pilot" premiered on NBC on March 24, 2005. The episode received a 5.0/13 in the Nielsen ratings among people aged 18–49, meaning that 5.0 percent of all 18- to 49-year-olds viewed the episode. The episode garnered 11.2 million viewers overall. "Pilot" ranked as the number one show in the key 18–49 demographic, outperforming all five of its network competitors. In addition, the episode ranked as the third most-watched show for that evening. With over 11 million views, it is the second most watched episode of the series, after the fifth season episode "Stress Relief," which attracted 22.9 million viewers.

=== Reviews ===
"Pilot" received mixed reviews after its premiere. Many sources deemed it another failed American reincarnation of a British show. A reviewer from the Deseret Morning News said, "Maybe, after The Office dies a quick death on NBC, the network will decide that trying to Americanize British TV comedies isn't such a great idea." The New York Daily News said the show was "neither daring nor funny", adding that "NBC's version is so diluted there's little left but muddy water".

Erik Adams of The A.V. Club gave the episode a C+ and felt that it was a lackluster copy of the original. He noted that "the fatal flaw of this episode—though it could've been a proviso in the licensing agreement signed by Gervais and Merchant—involves dropping reminders of the U.K. Office's pilot left and right", and that "this episode pales in comparison" to the original British version. However, Adams complimented the character of Pam, noting that "she's also the embodiment of a certain grounded, de-glamorized look and tone these early episodes sold well—before subsequent seasons dropped them along with the most obvious concessions to the 'workplace documentary' conceit."

Although many perceived the first episode to have been a failure, some outlets praised the new show. While berating the show for coming across "slowly and painfully", the Boston Globe said that "it is funny". In relation to past failed shows adapted from British shows, the Pittsburgh Post-Gazette stated "Despite botching the American remake of the Britcom Coupling, NBC makes a pretty good effort in its version of The Office in duplicating the original's ethos while injecting it with an American sensibility."
