= Pam Beesly =

Fictional character on NBC's "The Office"

- The Office character
- Jenna Fischer as Pam
- First appearance: "Pilot" (2005)
- Last appearance: "Finale" (2013)
- Created by: Greg Daniels; Ricky Gervais; Stephen Merchant
- Based on: Dawn Tinsley (British counterpart)
- Portrayed by: Jenna Fischer

In-universe information
- Full name: Pamela Morgan Beesly (Note: Pam Beesly's full name is Pamela Morgan Beesly (later Pamela Morgan Beesly Halpert). In "The Lover" Michael says to Pam, "Pamela Morgan Beesly, you need to apologize to your mother right now." In "Did I Stutter?" Jim says to Pam, "You know what would energize me? If you, Pamela Morgan Beesly..." In "Finale" Dwight says, "...and office administrator, Pamela Beesly Halpert...")
- Occupation: Receptionist, Dunder Mifflin, Scranton, Pennsylvania; Temporary Worker, Dunder Mifflin Corporate, New York City; Sales Representative, Michael Scott Paper Company; Sales Representative, Dunder Mifflin Sabre, Scranton, Pennsylvania; Office Administrator, Dunder Mifflin Sabre, Scranton, Pennsylvania; Office Administrator, Dunder Mifflin, Scranton, Pennsylvania; Freelance Mural Painter/Art Gallery Owner, Austin, Texas
- Family: William Beesly (father); Helene Beesly (mother); Penny Beesly (sister)
- Spouse: Jim Halpert (m. 2009)
- Significant other: Roy Anderson (ex-fiancé)
- Children: Cecelia Marie Halpert (daughter); Phillip Halpert (son)
- Relatives: Phillip (grandfather; deceased); Sylvia (grandmother); Millie (aunt); Isabel Poreba (cousin); Jocelyn Webster (cousin)
- Religion: Presbyterian
- Nationality: American

Pamela Morgan Beesly Halpert (née Beesly) is a fictional character on the U.S. television sitcom The Office, played by Jenna Fischer. Her counterpart in the original UK series of The Office is Dawn Tinsley. Pam begins the series as the receptionist at the paper distribution company Dunder Mifflin. She later becomes a saleswoman and, eventually, the office administrator, until she leaves in the series finale. Her character is at first shy and unsure but grows increasingly assertive as the series progresses. She is artistically inclined throughout the series and attends art school. Pam shares a friendship and then a romance with Jim Halpert, whom she begins dating in the fourth season, becomes engaged to in the fifth, marries in the sixth, and has children with in the sixth and eighth.

== Casting and character development ==
Pam's character was originally created to be very similar to her British counterpart, Dawn Tinsley. Even minute details, such as how Pam wore her hair each day, were considered by executive producer, Greg Daniels. "When I went in for The Office, the casting director said to me, 'Please look normal'," recalls Jenna Fischer. "Don't make yourself all pretty, and dare to bore me with your audition. Those were her words. Dare to bore me."

Taking heed of the advice, Fischer said little during the auditions, during which she was interviewed in character by show producers, in an improvisational format, to imitate the show's documentary premise. "My take on the character of Pam was that she didn't have any media training, so she didn't know how to be a good interview. And also, she didn't care about this interview," she told NPR. "So, I gave very short one-word answers and I tried very hard not to be funny or clever, because I thought that the comedy would come out of just, you know, the real human reactions to the situation... and they liked that take on it."

"When I went into the audition, the first question that they asked me in the character of Pam—they said, 'Do you like working as a receptionist?' I said, 'No.' And that was it. I didn't speak any more than that. And they started laughing."

Fischer found herself creating a very elaborate backstory for the character. For the first few seasons, she kept a list of the character history revealed on-screen by the creators, as well as her own imaginative thoughts on Pam's history. She created a rule with the set's hair and make-up department that it could not look as though it took Pam more than 30 minutes to do her hair, and she formulated ideas as to who gave Pam each piece of jewelry she wore or where she went to college. Fischer also carefully crafted Pam's quiet persona. "Well, my character of Pam is really stuck," she explained to NPR. "I mean, she's a subordinate in this office. And so, I think that for her, the only way she can express herself is in the silences, but you can say so much by not saying anything." Kathryn Hahn also auditioned for the role. Daniels originally envisioned Erica Vittina Phillips in the role.

Originally meek and passive, the character grew more assertive as the seasons passed, prompting Fischer to reassess her portrayal. "I have to approach Pam differently [now]," she explained in Season 4, a defining season in which her character finally begins a long-awaited relationship with Jim and is accepted into the Pratt Institute. "She is in a loving relationship, she has found her voice, she has started taking art classes. All of these things must inform the character and we need to see changes in the way she moves, speaks, dresses, etc."

Pam Halpert appeared in almost every episode with the exceptions of "Business Ethics", "St. Patrick's Day", and "New Leads" in which only her voice is heard, and several season 8 episodes from "Mrs. California" to "Pool Party", where she did not appear at all as Fischer was on maternity leave at the same time as the character.

== Storylines ==
=== Seasons 1–3 ===
At the beginning of the series, Pam and Roy have been dating for eight years and engaged for three years. Their open-ended engagement has become one of Michael's running gags and a sore spot for Pam.

Pam does not want her current job to become permanent, remarking that "I don't think it's many little girls' dream to be a receptionist." She will often do extra, unnecessary work to make her other co-workers happy. Pam is apathetic toward her work, evidenced by her frequent games of FreeCell on her office computer. However, in the pilot episode, she breaks down crying when Michael pulls an ill-judged prank by telling her that she will be fired.

Despite the abuse she takes from Michael in the early seasons, Pam becomes more honest and forward with Michael as the series progresses, often making sarcastic comments toward him.

While engaged to Roy, Pam denies, or is in denial about, having any romantic feelings for Jim. When Jim confesses his love for her at the Dunder Mifflin "Casino Night" she turns him down. She later talks to her mom on the phone and says Jim is her best friend (though she doesn't say his name), and says "Yeah, I think I am" to an unheard question. She is interrupted by Jim, who enters and kisses her; she responds by kissing him back.

Season 3 marks a turning point for Pam's character: she gains self-confidence and appears less passive and more self-assured as the season progresses. In "Gay Witch Hunt", the season's opener, it is revealed that Pam got cold feet before her wedding and did not marry Roy after all. Meanwhile, Jim has transferred to a different Dunder Mifflin branch, in Stamford, shortly after Pam rejected him a second time after their kiss. Pam moves into her own apartment, begins taking art classes, a pursuit that Roy had previously dismissed as a waste of time, and buys a new car. When the Scranton and Stamford branches merge, Jim returns to Scranton alongside a female co-worker, Karen Filippelli, whom he begins dating. Jim and Pam appeared to have ended all communication after Jim transfers to the Stamford branch; after Jim returns to Scranton, the encounters between the two are tense, despite both admitting to still harboring feelings for the other during the presence of the documentary cameras.

Roy vows to win Pam back, and after his initial efforts to improve his relationship with Pam are successful, the two get back together. After attending an after-work get-together at a local bar with their co-workers, Pam, feeling that she should be more honest with Roy, tells him about Jim kissing her at the casino night. An angered Roy yells, smashes a mirror, and trashes the bar. Pam, frightened and embarrassed by his reaction, breaks up with Roy immediately. Roy vows to kill Jim and in "The Negotiation", Roy unsuccessfully tries to attack Jim at work when he is pepper sprayed by Dwight; Roy is subsequently fired. Pam later reluctantly agrees to meet Roy for coffee at his request, and after the polite but brief meeting, it appears that their relationship has ended amicably, with Roy encouraging Pam to pursue Jim.

Pam participates in an art show, but few people attend. When Oscar and his partner visit the art show, they criticize Pam's work, not knowing that Pam is standing behind them. Affected by their statements, Pam tells the documentary crew that she is going to be more honest, culminating in a dramatic coal walk during the next-to-last episode of the season, "Beach Games", and a seemingly sincere speech to Jim in front of the entire office about their relationship. Michael also comes to the art show and reveals his loyalty and erratically kind heart by offering genuine and enthusiastic praise of Pam's art, and by buying, framing and hanging Pam's drawing of the Dunder Mifflin building in the office. In the season finale, "The Job", she leaves a friendly note in Jim's briefcase and an old memento depicting the 'gold medal' yogurt lid from the Office Olympics, which he sees during an interview for a job at Corporate in New York City. While he is asked how he "would function here in New York", Jim is shown to have his mind back in Scranton, still distracted by the thought of Pam. Jim withdraws his name from consideration and drives back to the office, where he interrupts a talking head Pam is doing for the documentary crew by asking her out for dinner. She happily accepts, visibly moved, abandoning a train of thought about how she would be fine if Jim got the job and never came back to Scranton. Karen quits soon after, becoming the regional manager at Dunder Mifflin's Utica branch.

=== Seasons 4–6 ===
In Season 4, Pam retains the assertiveness she developed in the third season. Jim and Pam confess that they have started dating after the camera crew catches them kissing. The office ultimately learns of their relationship after Toby catches Pam kissing Jim on the cheek. In "Chair Model", after teasing Pam about his impending proposal, Jim tells the documentary crew he is not kidding around about an engagement and shows them a ring he bought a week after he and Pam started dating. In the next few episodes, Jim fake-proposes to Pam multiple times. In "Goodbye, Toby", Pam discovers she's been accepted at Pratt Institute, an art and design school in Brooklyn, and in an interview, Jim announces that he will propose to Pam that evening. Just as Jim is preparing to propose, however, Andy Bernard stands up and makes his own impromptu proposal to Angela. Having had his thunder stolen by Andy, Jim reluctantly puts the ring back in his jacket pocket, leaving Pam visibly disappointed as she was expecting Jim to propose that night.

In the Season 5 premiere, "Weight Loss", Pam begins her three-month course at the Pratt Institute. In this episode, Jim proposes in the pouring rain at a rest stop. In "Business Trip", Pam learns that she is failing one of her classes and will have to remain in New York another three months to retake it. Although Jim is supportive and tells her he will wait for her, Pam ultimately makes the decision to return home, realizing she hates graphic design and misses Scranton. In "Two Weeks", Pam agrees to become Michael's first saleswoman in his not-yet-established company, The Michael Scott Paper Company. When CFO David Wallace makes an offer to buy the company, Michael negotiates in order to get their jobs at Dunder Mifflin back instead, including adding Pam to the sales team. In "Company Picnic", Pam, after dominating the company volleyball tournament, injures her ankle during a game and is taken to the hospital. At the hospital, the camera crew is stationed outside an exam room while a doctor updates Jim and Pam on her condition. There is no audio as the camera displays Jim and Pam embrace, looking shocked and ecstatic, implying that Pam is pregnant.

Pam's pregnancy is confirmed in the Season 6 premiere, in which Jim announces the pregnancy to the office staff. Jim and Pam have their wedding early in the season; the day of the wedding ceremony, Jim and Pam secretly get married at Niagara Falls before having the official ceremony at a church with their co-workers, friends and family. Following the wedding, a multi-episode story arc revolves around Michael hooking up with Pam's mother the night of the wedding. In response, Pam slaps Michael, and Michael and Pam's mother ultimately break up.

In "The Delivery", Pam and Jim have their first child, naming their daughter Cecelia Marie Halpert.

=== Season 7–9 ===
In "Counseling", Pam feels inadequate about her poor performance in sales and tricks Gabe into promoting her to a phony new salaried position called office administrator. Pam tries to use her new authority to force building manager Dwight to stop his annoying cost-cutting measures. Pam threatens to move the office to a new building, which Dwight discovers doesn't exist. Pam saves face, however, when Dwight secretly has his assistant provide her with a book on building regulations that proves Dwight's measures were not allowed. Pam also uses her position to buy Erin Hannon an expensive desktop computer to replace the original computer at the front desk, discreetly giving Andy a new computer, and giving Darryl three sick days.

In "Goodbye, Michael", Michael plans to leave for Colorado; Pam almost misses saying goodbye to Michael, spending most of the day out of the office trying to price shredders. Jim figures out Michael's plan to leave early and tells her by text. Pam reaches the airport in time and is the last person to see Michael before he departs.

At the beginning of Season 8, Pam is revealed to be pregnant with her and Jim's second child, Phillip Halpert. She begins her maternity leave after "Gettysburg", and eventually returns when she and Jim bring Cece and Phillip into the office. In both "Tallahassee" and "Test the Store", Pam is shown helping, and developing her friendship with Andy.

Early in season 9, Jim is restless about his life in Scranton and helps a friend start a Sports Marketing business, Athlead, in Philadelphia. However, he initially keeps this a secret from Pam. Upon discovering Jim's decision, Pam is concerned about the fact that Jim had kept it a secret from her, and is later disturbed to hear just how much of their money he had invested. Jim begins spending part of each work week in Philadelphia; in "Customer Loyalty", the strain of this on Pam is evident when she breaks down in tears. She is comforted by Brian, the boom mic operator of the film crew.

In "Moving On", Pam interviews for a job in Philadelphia to be closer to Jim, but she is turned off by the idea when her prospective new boss bears a striking resemblance in behavior to Michael Scott. Over dinner, Pam reveals to Jim that she doesn't really want to move to Philadelphia after all. However, in "Livin' the Dream", when Athlead is bought out and Jim is offered a large sum of money for three months to pitch the company across the country, Pam overhears Jim refuse the opportunity because of her and appears to have mixed feelings about this decision. In "A.A.R.M.", Pam tells Jim that she's afraid that he will resent her for making him stay, and that she might not be enough for him. Jim asks the camera crew to compile documentary footage of the two of them to show her. When she finishes the montage, which shows Jim taking back a letter he intended to give her with his teapot gift during Christmas; Jim finally gives her that letter, and she reads it, visibly moved. In the series finale, which takes place a year later, she reveals to Jim that she secretly put the house on the market, so that they can move to Austin, Texas, and take his job back at Athlead (now Athleap). Pam also says that she did not watch much of the documentary because she cannot stand how long it took her to "reach" Jim.

== Important relationships ==
Her years at the front desk have made Pam familiar with the Dunder-Mifflin staff, and she is shown to understand her coworkers' personalities, including those of the more eccentric Dwight Schrute and Michael Scott. She uses this knowledge to manipulate them, usually in their own or the company's interest (for example, by giving the staff detailed instructions on how to treat a heartbroken Michael in "The Chump"), but occasionally for her own benefit. This insight helps her in her role as office administrator and contributed to her promotion to the newly created position.

=== Jim Halpert ===
The "will they or won't they" tension between Jim and Pam is a strong storyline in the early episodes of The Office, encompassing much of Seasons 1 to 3. In the finale of Season 2, "Casino Night", Jim confesses his love for Pam but she denies him. They later on kiss in the episode but Pam rejects him yet again. In the opener of Season 4, the two characters are revealed to be dating. In Season 6, Jim and Pam get married in the beginning of the season, a feat considered noteworthy by many television critics, as bringing together the two lead love interests in a television series is often thought to be a risky venture. Their child is born in the second half of the season, during another hour long episode, "The Delivery". Pam and Jim's second child is born during season 8. In season 9, their marriage becomes strained when Jim takes up a second job in Philadelphia. They ultimately decide to leave Dunder Mifflin together so Jim can pursue his dream job.

=== Roy Anderson ===
When the series begins, Pam is engaged to her high school sweetheart Roy Anderson; this engagement is revealed to be three years old and running. Roy is overbearing, neglectful, and dismissive of Pam's desire to be an artist; Jim tells the camera crew that the only two problems in Pam's life seemed to be Roy and her job at Dunder Mifflin.

In the early seasons, there is a great deal of tension between Jim and Roy, with Roy often acting threateningly towards Jim. In "Basketball", when Jim starts to impress Pam with his basketball skills, Roy elbows Jim in the nose. In Season 2, when Jim encourages Pam to pursue a graphic arts internship offered by Dunder Mifflin, Roy objects to the opportunity and eventually convinces her that the idea is foolish. Pam ultimately calls off her wedding to Roy, but they remain friendly and he is determined to win her back by being less of a jerk. She reconciles with Roy at Phyllis's wedding as a response to watching Jim date Karen. In an attempt at a fresh start with Roy, Pam comes clean about Jim kissing her during "Casino Night". Roy flies into a violent rage and Pam ends the relationship on the spot. The next day, Roy attempts to attack Jim in the office and is summarily fired. Following the incident, Roy meets Pam for coffee and encourages her to pursue her feelings for Jim.

=== Michael Scott ===
In the series pilot, Michael is overtly rude to Pam and at one point fakes her firing, leaving her in tears. He often makes suggestive or tone deaf remarks about her appearance, makes advances on her, and at one point lies that they used to date. Despite this, Pam has one of the closest relationships with Michael throughout the series and is fequently called upon my Michael to advise him on personal and professional dilemmas. She has a deep understanding of Michael's eccentricities, and is often the only one in the office who is able to navigate his meltdowns or talk him out of a bad idea. Michael expresses support for Pam's artistic goals, even attending her art show when the rest of the Dunder Mifflin staff do not. Their experience at the Michael Scott Paper Company further bonds Michael and Pam's relationship and results in more of a mutual respect between them. In Season 6, Pam becomes furious at Michael for dating her mom Helene; however, after Michael breaks up with Helene, they are civil towards one another. In Michael's finale, "Goodbye, Michael", Pam spends the whole day looking for a shredder, believing that Michael was leaving the next day. As Michael takes off his microphone and heads down the airport concourse, Pam runs to him with no shoes and hugs him as he kisses her cheek. In an interview, Pam tells the camera that he was happy to be going home to see Holly.

=== Toby Flenderson ===
Toby, the Human Resources Representative for Dunder Mifflin in the Scranton branch, has a secret crush on Pam. In "A Benihana Christmas" she gives him her Dunder Mifflin bathrobe, a display of friendly affection, after he spent the day feeling bad that Dwight took his. In "Cocktails", while walking into Poor Richards, Pam indicates a liking to one of the toys in a claw machine, and Toby tries to win the toy for her for the rest of the night. In "Dunder Mifflin Infinity", Toby witnesses Pam kissing Jim Halpert in the break room, which prompts him to issue a memo about public displays of affection in the workplace. Later, when Jim and Pam admit they are dating and ask to fill out a disclosure form, he hesitates to give them a form, saying they should wait and see. In "Night Out", Toby awkwardly rubs her knee while they share a laugh, and the rest of the office watches in horror. In his mortification, Toby immediately announces that he is moving to Costa Rica before jumping over the locked gate and fleeing. In "Goodbye, Toby", Toby purchases a DSLR camera just to get a picture with Pam. On the eve of his departure, Pam confesses to the cameras that she always thought Toby was "kind of cute". In "Niagara", Pam and Jim are late for their wedding and he is visibly excited at the prospect that the wedding might not happen. In "Finale", Pam and Toby dance with each other at Dwight's wedding, with Toby beginning to cry as Pam comforts him. When she asks, "Is it me?", he replies that "It's everything!".

=== Angela Martin ===
Pam and Angela have a frenemy-type relationship, with Angela's mean attitude often serving as a foil to Pam's soft-spoken demeanor. In the beginning of the series, the two generally dislike each other. In “The Alliance,” Pam tells the documentary crew that Angela rejected flipping a coin in the party planning committee because she is morally against gambling, which Pam found ironic because by saying that Angela “was gambling” that Pam wouldn't smack her. In “Conflict Resolution,” Angela remarks that she had not received an invitation to Pam's wedding. Pam reveals in a talking head that she didn't invite Angela because she didn't want anyone at her wedding who has called her a “hussy.” Pam changes her mind and personally hands Angela her save-the-date, explaining that she didn't have Angela's zip code. Angela smiled and seemed genuinely happy to be invited, though she told the documentary crew that the invitation wasn't her taste. When Pam learns that someone had complained about her to Toby, she immediately assumes that it was Angela and prepares to uninvite her from the wedding, only to be stopped when Jim admits that he had registered (and subsequently retracted) the complaint.

Much of the tension between Pam and Angela originates from their involvement in the Party Planning Committee, with the latter earning a reputation as the harsh leader of the committee. In "Halloween,” Angela expresses disappointment at Pam because she made brownies rather than chips and dip and states that she's trying to figure out why Pam is “sabotaging things.” When Angela kicks Karen Filippelli out of a meeting in “A Benihana Christmas,” Pam teams up with Karen to throw a “margarita-karaoke-Christmas” at the same time as Angela's party. After most of the office skips Angela's party, Pam notices that Angela is upset and offers to merge the parties. Angela reveals that the cord for the karaoke machine, which had previously been missing, was hidden in the potted plant right outside the conference room, heavily implying that she stole it to sabotage their party. In “Costume Contest,” Angela tells the documentary crew that Pam did a good job picking the prize for the office's Halloween costume contest, though she added that she didn't want to give Pam a compliment because she's so “bleh.”

Although she is known for her judgmental attitude, Angela is particularly hostile toward Pam for her office relationships. In “Office Olympics,” when Pam asks Angela what games she plays during work, Angela responds that she plays “Pam pong,” wherein she counts the number of times Jim goes to the reception desk to talk to Pam, which makes Pam visibly uncomfortable. Angela calls Pam “the office mattress” when she learns that Pam is dating Jim in “Dunder Mifflin Infinity.” In “Niagara,” Pam asks the office to keep her pregnancy a secret, explaining that her grandmother doesn't know, and her old-fashioned beliefs would cause her to be offended. Angela states that decent people everywhere would be offended by Pam's pregnancy and that she's lucky to have a grandmother. Pam tells Angela that she doesn't have to come to the wedding. In “Christening,” Angela admonishes Pam and Jim for not getting a caterer for Cece's christening and tells them that they don't think. Once Angela is out of earshot, Pam tells Cece that Angela is just jealous because she doesn't get to come home to a baby as cute as her. In “Search Committee,” Pam makes fun of Senator Lipton's use of third-person language when proposing to Angela. Angela replies that not everyone is as informal as Pam and Jim and imitates Jim calling Pam “dude” in his proposal. Later, Angela asks Pam for the plans for her “dream wedding” that she couldn't afford, remarking that instead Pam had an “ironic” wedding. Pam, visibly offended, states that she hopes Angela has a beautiful wedding.

In season 8, it is revealed that Pam and Angela are both pregnant. During their pregnancies, Angela repeatedly insults Pam. In “The List,” Angela tells the documentary crew that Pam is “big pregs” and calls herself “little pregs.” At first, Pam and Angela were walking buddies and were able to strike up a friendship, but that ended in “The Incentive” when Angela revealed that she had reported Pam to social services for drinking herbal tea from coffee mugs while pregnant. In “Garden Party,” it is revealed that both Angela and Pam want to use the name Phillip for their babies, with Pam choosing the name of her grandfather and Angela choosing the name of her cat. However, Pam and Angela later bond when Oscar compares being a parent to owning a dog in “After Hours.”

Despite the hostility between the two, they sometimes see each other as friends and talk over the file cabinet between their desks. For example, in “The Return,” Angela tells Pam the real reason Dwight left for New York before telling anyone else. In “Fun Run,” Angela asks for Pam's advice when she suspects that Dwight killed her cat, Sprinkles. Pam is among the women at Angela's bachelorette party and attends Angela's wedding to Dwight in “Finale.”
