= David Denman =

American actor (born 1973)

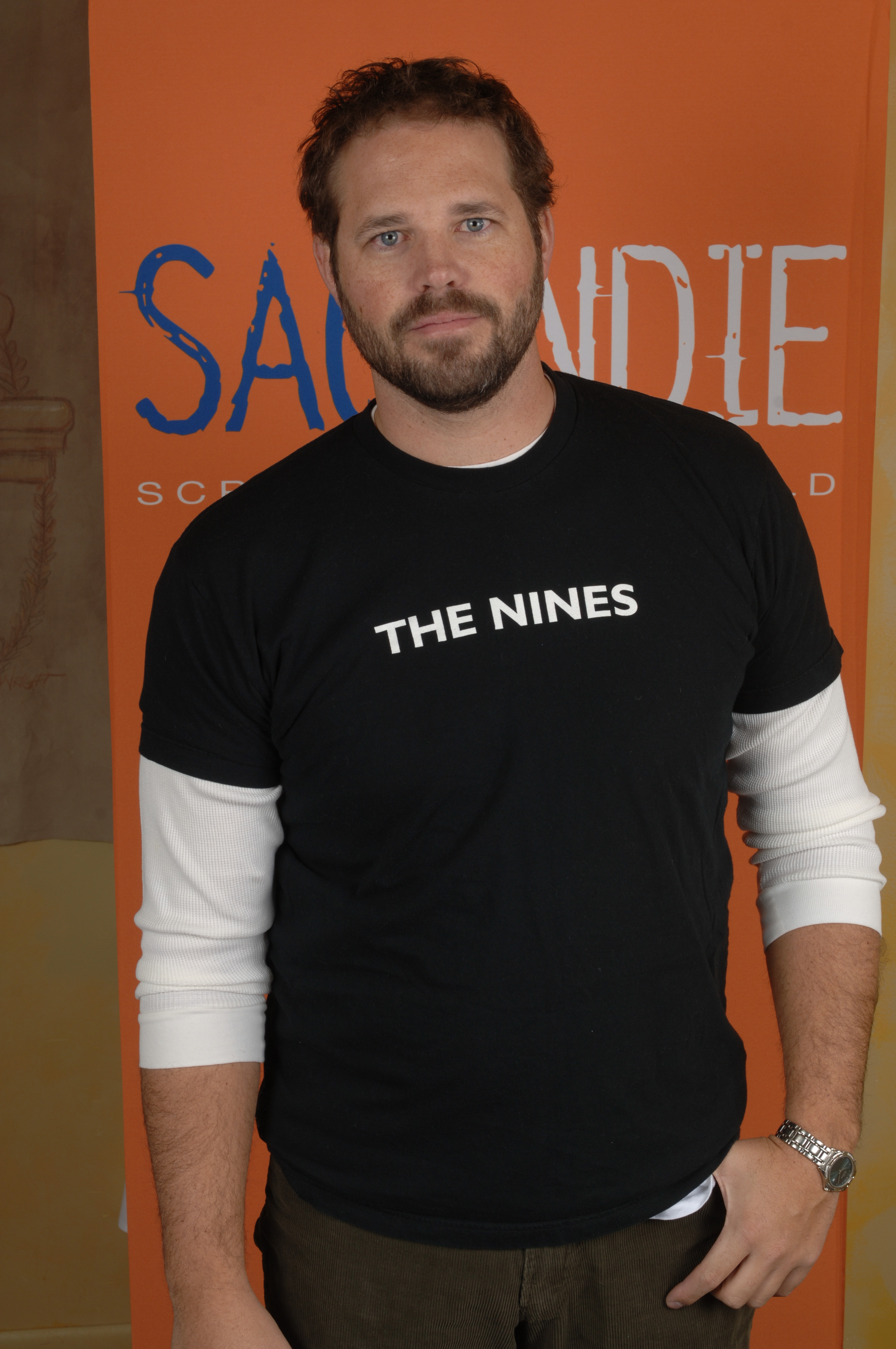
- Denman in 2007
- Born: July 25, 1973 (age 53); Newport Beach, California, U.S.
- Education: Juilliard School (BFA)
- Occupation: Actor
- Years active: 1997–present
- Spouse: Mercedes Mason (m. 2014)
- Children: 2

David Denman (born July 25, 1973) is an American actor. He played Roy Anderson on the NBC sitcom The Office (2005–2008, 2011–2012), which earned him a Screen Actors Guild Award.

== Early life and education ==
Denman was born in Newport Beach, California. He attended eight schools while growing up all over Southern California. His family moved to Sequim, Washington, when he was nine years old, living on a farm, which lasted two years before they returned to Orange County, California. He graduated from Fountain Valley High School, where classmates included actor Omar Metwally and writer-director Craig Brewer. He later attended the summer training congress at American Conservatory Theater in San Francisco.

He spent two years at Orange Coast College, where he performed in and directed over twenty productions. He went on to earn a Bachelor of Fine Arts degree from the Juilliard School's Drama Division (1993–1997, Group 26), where his classmates included Sara Ramirez and Alan Tudyk.

== Career ==
Denman made his film debut with Keanu Reeves and Gene Hackman as the deaf tight-end in the Warner Bros. football comedy The Replacements. His other feature credits include Fair Game, Fanboys, The Nines, Shutter, Smart People, Let Go, Out Cold, and Big Fish. His 2013 films include After Earth and Jobs. In 2016, he starred in the Michael Bay film 13 Hours about the 2012 Benghazi attack.

In addition to The Office, Denman's other television roles include Frank Sheehan in the HBO limited series drama Mare of Easttown. Mike Reilly on the short-lived Fox comedy Traffic Light and in Robert Kirkman's short lived horror series Outcast. He has recurred as Ed Brooks on Parenthood, as Tony on Drop Dead Diva and as Skip the Demon on Angel. He appeared on such TV shows as ER, The X-Files, Mad Men and True Detective. In 2025, Denman portrayed Keith Smith, an alternate version of Peacemaker's brother, in the second season of Peacemaker. In 2026, Denman was cast as Ford in the fourth and final season of the Netflix series The Night Agent.

== Personal life ==
In September 2014, Denman married actress and former model Mercedes Mason. The couple had their first child in January 2018 and their second child in May 2021.

Denman is also an avid triathlete.

== Filmography ==
=== Film ===
Year	Title	Role	Notes
2000	The Replacements	Brian Murphy	
2001	Out Cold	Lance	
2003	The Singing Detective	Soldier with Betty Dark	
2003	Big Fish	Don Price (age 18–22)	
2006	When a Stranger Calls	Officer Burroughs	
2007	The Nines	Agitated Man / Parole Officer	
2007	If I Had Known I Was a Genius	Baker	
2007	Take	Marty Nichols	
2008	Shutter	Bruno	
2008	Smart People	William	
2009	Fanboys	Chaz	
2010	Fair Game	Nervous Dave	
2011	Let Go	Walter Dishman	
2013	After Earth	Private McQuarrie	
2013	Jobs	Al Alcorn	
2013	Beneath the Harvest Sky	George	
2014	Men, Women & Children	Jim Vance	
2015	The Gift	Greg	
2016	13 Hours: The Secret Soldiers of Benghazi	Dave "Boon" Benton	
2016	Is That a Gun in Your Pocket?	Byron	
2017	Power Rangers	Sam Scott	
2017	Logan Lucky	Moody Chapman	
2018	Puzzle	Louie	
2019	Brightburn	Kyle Breyer	
2020	Greenland	Ralph Vento	
2022	Emancipation	General William Dwight	
2023	Joy Ride	Joe Sullivan	
2023	The Equalizer 3	Frank Conroy	
2024	Rebel Ridge	Officer Evan Marston	

=== Television ===
Year	Title	Role	Notes
1997	ER	Angel / Jeremy Willis	Episode: "When the Bough Breaks"
1997	Chicago Hope	Ethan	Episode: "All in the Family"
1998	The Pretender	Daniel	Episode: "Crash"
1999	Beyond Belief: Fact or Fiction	Husband / David	2 episodes
1999	The X-Files	Wallace Schiff	Episode: "Field Trip"
1999	A Vow to Cherish	Kyle Brighton	Television movie
2000	Arli$$	Woody	Episode: "The Sum of the Parts"
2001–2003	Angel	Skip	4 episodes
2002	CSI: Miami	Tyler Hamilton	Episode: "Just One Kiss"
2002	Crossing Jordan	Cole Tanner	Episode: "Don't Look Back"
2004	Without a Trace	Mike Clemmens	Episode: "Shadows"
2004	The Perfect Husband: The Laci Peterson Story	Tommy Vignatti	Television movie
2004	Second Time Around	Kent	2 episodes
2005	Night Stalker	Henry Gale	Episode: "Pilot"
2005–2008; 2011–2012	The Office	Roy Anderson	Recurring (season 1); Main cast (seasons 2–3); Guest (seasons 5–9), 32 episodes
2006	Bones	Phil Garfield	Episode: "The Woman in the Tunnel"
2006	Strong Medicine	David	Episode: "My Sister, My Doctor, Myself"
2006	The Office: The Accountants	Roy Anderson	Episode: "Someone in the Warehouse"
2007	Grey's Anatomy	Rick Jacobs	Episode: "Kung Fu Fighting"
2007	K-Ville	Luke Sherman	Episode: "Melissa"
2007	Close to Home	Tim O'Neil	Episode: "Making Amends"
2008	Gary Unmarried	Ronnie Mitchell	Episode: "Gary Meets the Gang"
2009	In Plain Sight	Ed Fogerty / Ed Flint	Episode: "Miles to Go"
2009–2010	Drop Dead Diva	Tony Nicastro	8 episodes
2010	Brothers & Sisters	Brad Lewinsky	Episode: "The Pasadena Primary"
2011	Traffic Light	Mike Reilly	Main cast, 13 episodes
2012	Person of Interest	Graham Wyler	Episode: "The High Road"
2012	Vegas	Clay Stinson	Episode: "Masquerade"
2013–2014	Parenthood	Ed	Recurring role, 11 episodes
2014	How to Get Away with Murder	Kevin Murphy	Episode: "Smile, or Go to Jail"
2015	Mad Men	Jerry Fanning	Episode: "The Milk and Honey Route"
2015	True Detective	Malkin	Episode: "Down Will Come"
2015	Two and a Half Men	Jack	Episode: "For Whom the Booty Calls"
2016	Angel from Hell	Evan	3 episodes
2016–2017	Outcast	Mark Holter	Main cast, 11 episodes
2019	Heartstrings	Deke Fletcher	Episode: "J.J. Sneed"
2021	Mare of Easttown	Frank Sheehan	Miniseries; 6 episodes
2022	The Serpent Queen	Pierre Marques	Episodes: "The New Era", "The First Regency"
2022	The Recruit	Kevin Mills	3 episodes
2022–2023	Bosch: Legacy	Kurt Dockweiler	5 episodes
2024	Chad	Mr. Dubin	Episode: "Señor Doobs"
2024	Eric	Cripp	Miniseries; 3 episodes
2024	Laid	Detective Brenowitz	3 episodes
2025	Peacemaker	Keith Smith / Captain Triumph	Recurring role; Season 2
2026	The Five-Star Weekend	Kyle McKenzie	Recurring role
2027	The Night Agent	Ford	Main cast (announced); Season 4
