= The Duel (The Office) =

- The Office episode
- Episode no.: Season 5 Episode 12
- Directed by: Dean Holland
- Written by: Jennifer Celotta
- Cinematography by: Randall Einhorn
- Editing by: Dean Holland
- Production code: 511
- Original air date: January 15, 2009

Guest appearance
- Andy Buckley as David Wallace

Episode chronology
← Previous "Moroccan Christmas"	Next → "Prince Family Paper"
- The Office (American season 5)

"The Duel" is the twelfth episode of the fifth season of the American comedy television series The Office and the show's 84th overall episode. The episode aired on NBC on January 15, 2009. In the episode, Andy learns his fiancee Angela is having an affair with Dwight, and the two challenge each other to a physical fight to win her affections. Meanwhile, Michael travels to New York City for a meeting with David Wallace, where Wallace seeks managerial advice from Michael due to the poor financial condition of the fictional company, Dunder Mifflin.

The episode was written by Jennifer Celotta and directed by Dean Holland, the show's long-time editor making his directorial debut. It featured the conclusion of the love triangle between Dwight, Andy and Angela, a subplot that had been going on since the end of the fourth season. David Wallace's meeting with Michael marked the show's first acknowledgment of the economic crisis facing much of the globalized nation at the time of the episode due to the 2008 financial crisis.

"The Duel" was seen as a defining episode for Andy Bernard, who is portrayed in a more sympathetic way than he has been seen in previous episodes. Ed Helms was particularly praised for his performance. Several bits of dialogue were improvised, especially during the duel scene between Andy and Dwight. That scene was shot over the course of six hours in an exterior parking lot set, with Helms and Wilson providing their own stunts.

The episode received generally positive reviews, and was largely described as an effective conclusion to the love triangle subplot. According to Nielsen Media Research, "The Duel" was seen by 8.35 million viewers. During its original American broadcast, it received particularly strong competition from the CBS drama series CSI: Crime Scene Investigation, which that night featured the final appearance of actor William Petersen.

== Plot ==
Andy Bernard still has not learned about his fiancee Angela Martin's affair with Dwight Schrute, seventeen days after Phyllis Vance revealed it to everyone else in the Dunder Mifflin office. Michael Scott, who has since learned the news as well, suggests he should be the one to inform Andy, but the entire office argues that Angela should be the one to break the news. Jim Halpert is particularly concerned that Andy's past anger management issues may lead to violence. Dwight tries convincing Angela to tell Andy, but she continues to put it off despite claiming to Dwight that she loves him. This refusal, along with wanting to avoid the ensuing conflict, leaves Michael to tell Andy before he leaves for a meeting with David Wallace, leaving Andy shocked and dismayed. Angela reluctantly confirms the affair occurred, but also tells Andy that she loves him, and Andy realizes everybody else in the office already knew about it.

Andy confronts Dwight and challenges him to a "duel" in the parking lot, with Angela as a prize to the winner. Dwight accepts and Angela, anxious to avoid making a choice between the two men herself, says she will honor the results of the duel. Jim, acting as office manager in Michael's absence, tries to talk them out of the duel and confiscates Dwight's hidden weapons around the office, but concedes he does not have the power to prevent a fight outside the office. In New York, Michael is nervous about why David Wallace wants to meet with him. But as the meeting begins, David tells him Scranton is the most successful Dunder Mifflin branch amid a difficult economic climate, and he wants to learn why Michael's management has been so successful. Michael is delighted with the compliment and attention, but can only manage vague, off-topic and largely nonsensical answers. David claims it is difficult for someone to make a self-evaluation, and Michael leaves the meeting in a very pleasant mood.

In the parking lot, Andy has not shown up for the duel, instead leaving a deliberately verbose note hanging in the bushes saying he has given up. As Dwight reads it, Andy sneaks up behind him in his Toyota Prius, a hybrid car that remains completely silent when driven below five miles per hour due to the electric motor. Impressed by Andy's deviousness, the rest of the office does not warn Dwight, saying that Andy "deserves the win". Andy pins Dwight between the car and the large bushes in the parking lot. Dwight, having no weapons, whips the car with his belt. Jim races out to check that Dwight is not seriously injured, but they snap at him to go away. The two bicker back and forth about Angela, leading to Andy revealing that he has had sex with Angela, despite previous assumptions that only Dwight had done so. Realizing that Angela played them both, Dwight and Andy both admit defeat and return to the office, where Andy calls to cancel his wedding cake, and Dwight throws away a bobblehead doll Angela previously bought him as a gift. A saddened Angela realizes she has lost both men.

== Production ==
=== Writing ===
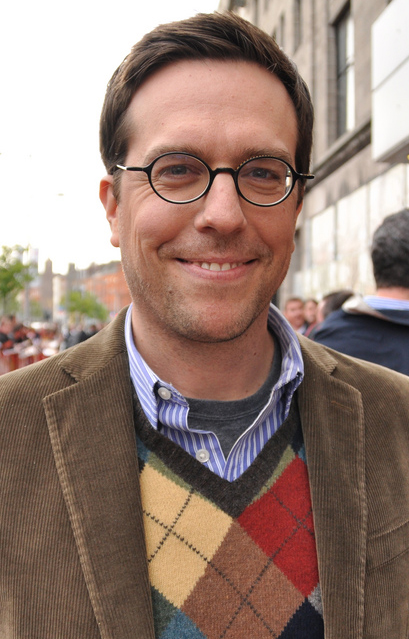
"The Duel" was seen as a defining episode for the character Andy Bernard, and actor Ed Helms was praised for his performance.

"The Duel" was written by Jennifer Celotta, a producer and show runner with The Office. The episode featured the conclusion of the love triangle between Dwight, Andy and Angela, a subplot that had been going on since the fourth season finale, "Goodbye, Toby". The cast and writing staff saw "The Duel" as a defining episode for Andy Bernard because it demonstrated a softer, more emotional side of the character. Dean Holland, who directed the episode, said this was particularly effective because in past episodes, he displayed such rage problems that he had to attend anger management courses, but in "The Duel" he responded to horrible news in a heartrending way. Rainn Wilson particularly praised Ed Helms' performance, saying, "He gives a lot of heart and soul, and Andy is such a doofus and a douche, and now you really get to see his heart break. There's some reality there. That's the great thing this show gives us, just when you think you know the characters and they're two-dimensional and they're goofy and crazy, in their own way, you get real human redemption."

The subplot with David Wallace seeking managerial advice from Michael due to the poor financial condition of Dunder Mifflin was the first acknowledgment of the economic crisis facing much of the globalized nation at the time of the episode due to the 2008 financial crisis. This set the stage for a continuing motif of financial difficulties for Dunder Mifflin, which would eventually culminate in the sixth season episode "Secret Santa", in which it is revealed the company has been sold and its executives all fired.

A number of scenes and lines in "The Duel" were improvised by the actors. During one scene, Michael repeatedly tries to tell Andy about Angela's affair, but Jim constantly interrupts him while forcing him into his office. John Krasinski improvised most of his lines and noises, and Wilson said they were so funny, "I was just chortling over at my desk." The scene as it appears in the episode consists of about six different takes spliced together. Krasinski also conceived a moment in "The Duel" when Jim returns to his desk by awkwardly passing through Dwight and Andy while they are facing off against each other. Wilson called the addition to the scene "a really nice touch". During another scene, Dwight sings a nursery rhyme that goes, "Learn your rules, you better learn your rules, if you don't, you'll be eaten in your sleep!" Celotta and Wilson came up with several versions of the song, but the one that appeared in the final episode was conceived by Wilson.

A line in which Dwight tells Andy that Angela "certainly seems to enjoy making lovemaking" was improvised by Wilson. Much of the dialogue between Andy and Dwight during the duel scene was also improvised. It was writer Paul Lieberstein, who served as show runner along with Celotta at the time, who suggested the idea of Andy sneaking up on Dwight with his Toyota Prius. The original script called for the entire office cast to come down to the parking lot from the Dunder Mifflin office to try to stop Dwight and Andy from fighting. However, the staging proved awkward during filming, so John Krasinski suggested that only Jim go down to the parking lot while the others stayed behind, and the change was eventually incorporated into the episode.

=== Filming ===
"The Duel" marked the directorial debut of Dean Holland, a longtime film editor with The Office. The original cut of the episode was 38 minutes long and Holland, who edited it himself, had to trim it down to 22 minutes. During a cold open scene, the Dunder Mifflin employees run past a radar speed sign in the street and compete for the best speed. This was inspired by Aaron Shure, a television producer and The Office screenwriter, who worked on the staff of another television show that held races in front of a radar speed sign in exactly the same way. It was about 96 degrees when the scene was filmed, which made running particularly difficult for the actors. Despite the extremely hot temperatures, fake snow was placed in the exterior shots because the writers were trying to simulate the winter season weather of Scranton, Pennsylvania, where The Office is set, rather than the Van Nuys district in Los Angeles, California, where the show was filmed.

The original script called for Michael to tell Andy about Angela's affair outside in the parking lot before getting into his car and driving away. When filming began, Holland considered filming the scene inside the car instead. Steve Carell suggested Michael get in the car and leave Andy outside, then tell him while driving away, which was how the scene was ultimately shot. During a scene when Andy returns to the office and confronts his co-workers, there is a long, awkward silence, and the script originally called for Kevin to pass gas and ruin the tension. During filming, it was changed so Phyllis would pass gas instead because it was decided it would be funnier if it came from the other side of the room from Andy. During the editing process, Holland decided the joke did not work very well and cut it, but a brief moment of Dwight reacting in a disgusted way to the flatulence, while maintaining a defensive fighting pose toward Andy, can still be seen in the finished episode.

The duel scene was shot over the course of six hours in the exterior parking lot setting. Natural lighting from the sun changed so drastically over that time, large bounce cards had to be placed above the hedges so the shadows would remain consistent throughout the shoot. Ed Helms actually drove the car during the scenes, and Rainn Wilson performed his own stunts. The crew considered using a stunt double for Wilson, but they found his acting so funny during filming that they decided against it. At the end of "The Duel", Michael Scott talks directly to the camera with a New York City background behind him. The scenes were not filmed in the city, but rather in front of a greenscreen where the scenery images were later added.

== Cultural references ==
During the cold open, after Michael believes he has run extremely fast, he says, "Eat that, Carl Lewis", a reference to the American track and field athlete and gold medalist.

== Reception ==
In its original American broadcast on January 15, 2009, "The Duel" was watched by 8.35 million viewers. It aired the same night as actor William Petersen's final appearance on the CBS drama series CSI: Crime Scene Investigation, which drew an unusually high viewership of 23.13 million viewers. Nevertheless, The Office outperformed CSI in the ratings among viewers between ages 18 and 34, earning a 5.0 rating/13 share compared to CSI's 3.8 rating/10 share. Both shows were outperformed in that age group by the ABC drama series Grey's Anatomy, which drew a 5.2 rating/13 share, and a total of 12.95 million viewers for the night. Among viewers between ages 18 and 49, "The Duel" drew a 4.3 rating/10 share, which was lower than both CSI and Grey's Anatomy. The Office also earned higher ratings in its timeslot than the Fox reality television series Kitchen Nightmares (4.28 million viewers) and the CW thriller series Supernatural (2.96 million viewers).

It's fun to see an episode of The Office that is more plot-driven, as opposed to the norm of being based on observational humor. The Andy/Dwight/Angela triangle has proven to be a lot of fun. They are the anti-Jim and Pam, and in this episode it all really pays off well.

— Travis Fickett, IGN

"The Duel" received generally positive reviews. Andy calling off the wedding after learning Angela cheated on him with Dwight ranked number 6 in phillyBurbs.com's top ten moments from the fifth season of The Office. "The Duel" was voted the fourteenth highest-rated episode out of 26 from the fifth season, according to an episode poll at the fansite OfficeTally, where the episode was rated 8.11 out of 10. Alan Sepinwall of The Star-Ledger said the episode "brings the Dwight/Angela/Andy triangle to an effective close" that made him feel sympathy for both Dwight and Andy. He was disappointed, however, that the idea of David Wallace trying to learn from Michael seemed undeveloped. The A.V. Club writer Scott Tobias said "The Duel" efficiently resolved a major storyline in 30 minutes, and was "a nice mix of the wacky and the melancholy, though it's perhaps a little long on the former and a little short on the latter". He called the David Wallace subplot "funny-but-forgettable". Travis Fickett of IGN said the episode was surprisingly intense and dramatic, and particularly highlighted the talents of Ed Helms. Fickett said "The Duel" was a great payoff to the Angela love triangle storyline and demonstrated how well The Office varies and paces stories from episode to episode.

TV Guide writer Shahzad Abbas called it possibly the best episode of the season. Abbas particular enjoyed the tension as Andy learned the truth and the resolution of the duel. Entertainment Weekly writer Alynda Wheat called it an "instant classic" and a vast improvement over the most recent string of episodes. Wheat called the interactions between Dwight and Andy "brilliance" and described the cold open "pretty genius". New York magazine writer Will Leitch said the Andy-Dwight-Angela triangle was like a "dirtier, meaner, crazier parody" of the Jim-Pam-Roy subplot from previous seasons, and Leitch appreciated that it was resolved in a darker way than the latter love triangle. Brian Howard of The Journal News called it a "great episode", and particularly enjoyed the moments between Angela and Dwight, and the way Jim tried to prevent Michael from telling Andy about the affair. Jay Black of TV Squad said he enjoyed seeing Angela get her comeuppance, and felt he could relate to the voyeuristic interest the office co-workers took in the duel. Black praised the Michael subplot because it "provided an ironic counter-weight" to the duel because Michael was being praised for his managerial skills while his co-workers fought each other in the parking lot.
