= Two Weeks (The Office) =

- The Office episode
- Episode no.: Season 5 Episode 21
- Directed by: Paul Lieberstein
- Written by: Aaron Shure
- Cinematography by: Randall Einhorn
- Editing by: Stuart Bass
- Production code: 521
- Original air date: March 26, 2009

Guest appearances
- Idris Elba as Charles Miner; Hugh Dane as Hank Tate

Episode chronology
← Previous "New Boss"	Next → "Dream Team"
- The Office (American season 5)

"Two Weeks" is the twenty-first episode of the fifth season of the television series The Office and the 93rd overall episode of the series. It originally aired on NBC in the United States on March 26, 2009. In this episode, Michael, who has given his two weeks' notice to Dunder Mifflin, tries to convince others in the office to quit and join him in starting a new paper company. Meanwhile, Pam spends her day trying to put together the new photocopier and becomes frustrated with her job.

The episode was written by Aaron Shure and directed by Paul Lieberstein. Executive story editor Charlie Grandy conceived the idea of Michael leaving Dunder Mifflin, and the writers collectively decided the Pam character should leave and try to find out what she wants from life. The episode included a guest appearance by Idris Elba, who played new Dunder Mifflin vice president Charles Miner. "Two Weeks" received generally positive reviews and, according to Nielsen ratings, was watched by 8.7 million overall viewers and was the top-rated show on NBC the week it aired. "Two Weeks" received a Primetime Emmy Award nomination for Outstanding Single-Camera Picture Editing for a Comedy Series.

== Synopsis ==
Having submitted his two weeks' notice to Dunder Mifflin, Michael Scott begins goofing off and drinking around the office, while new company vice president Charles Miner plans to hire the new regional manager from the outside, for "obvious reasons." The employees suggest that Michael start looking for another job. Michael is unworried at first, until he learns how poorly the economy is performing. He first tries Prince Paper, but they had been run out of business by Dunder Mifflin. After finding no available work, Michael decides to start his own paper company and unsuccessfully tries to convince others around the office to join him. When Charles catches Michael labeling Dunder Mifflin customer lists with his new company's name, he orders security guard Hank to escort Michael from the building. Charles cuts off Michael's attempt to deliver parting remarks to the office, forcing him to leave the office with immediate effect. Michael drives out of the parking lot, but is later spotted sneaking back into the building.

The office has received a new copy machine, but it is not assembled, so Pam Beesly spends the day putting it together as the rest of the employees hassle and tease her. She finally completes assembling it, but feels no satisfaction about it afterward, and comes to realize how underutilized and underappreciated she is at her job. Meanwhile, Angela Martin and Kelly Kapoor continue to flirt with Charles.

Michael sneaks back into the office, crawling on the floor below the desks so Charles, who is sitting in the conference room, will not notice him. Michael grabs his customer list and makes a final desperate offer for the other employees to join him. Charles notices Michael and physically threatens him, prompting Michael to leave without the customer list. After Charles angrily closes the conference room door, Pam follows Michael out of the building, announcing that she is leaving with him. However, she tells Michael she wants to be a salesperson at his new company, not a receptionist. Michael agrees, then asks Jim Halpert if he wants to come with them, but he declines. Pam and Michael leave together, feeling both exhilarated and apprehensive.

At the end of the episode, Charles, who still knows very little about the employees at the Scranton branch, decides to make Kevin Malone the temporary receptionist and make Stanley Hudson the office's "Productivity Czar," much to the surprise of both men.

== Production ==
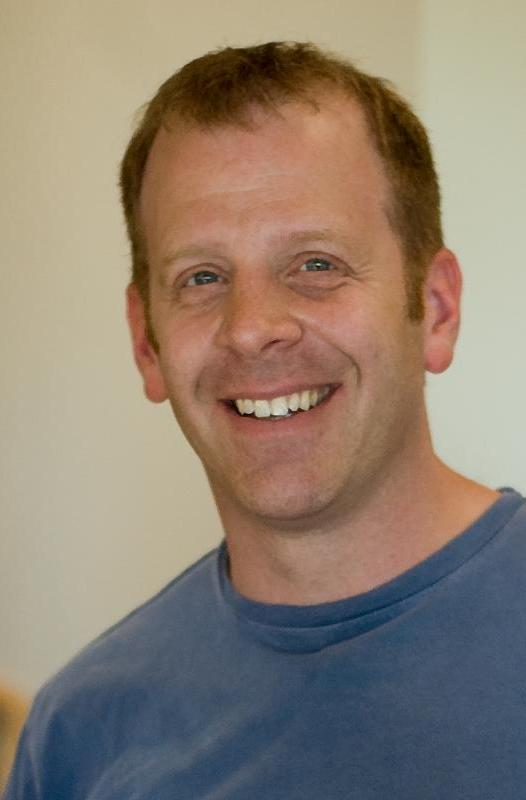
The Office actor and producer Paul Lieberstein directed "Two Weeks".

"Two Weeks" was written by Aaron Shure and directed by Paul Lieberstein. Executive story editor Charlie Grandy conceived the idea of Michael leaving Dunder Mifflin. Shure said there was a great deal of debate among the writers about Pam's decision to leave Dunder Mifflin with Michael, but they decided to move in that direction to demonstrate Pam was trying to figure out what she wants in life. Lieberstein thought of the idea of the final scene in which Michael and Pam's faces go from optimism to concern, because he felt it would anchor the episode. The decision to have Charles choose Stanley as productivity czar and Kevin as receptionist was made by Shure the day before the episode's draft was handed in because he wanted to have Charles make "rookie mistakes, despite all his poise." "Two Weeks" was the second of six episodes guest starring Idris Elba, best known as Stringer Bell from The Wire. Elba said he did not watch the episode after it aired because "I'm hypercritical about my work, so I try not to torture myself."

The official The Office website included three cut scenes from "Two Weeks" within a week of the episode's original release. In one minute-long clip, Michael asks Darryl for warehousing advice for his new paper company; Darryl gives Michael encouraging words about the new business venture before admitting, "I'm messing with you. This doesn't sound like a good idea." In a second one-minute clip, Michael tries stealing office supplies from the Dunder Mifflin office for his new company, until he is caught by Charles, who literally chases him out of the office; Charles then tries to describe what Michael's like to the camera but finds himself shocked into silence. In a final 38-second clip, Kelly visits Michael's office to ask what he will do with his life, then starts talking about her own fantasy of running off to Mexico with Charles. B. J. Novak wrote a talking-head segment for Toby, where he compares Michael to a movie on a plane because "it's not great, but it's something to watch, and when it's over you're like, how much longer is this flight? Now what?"

An original draft for the episode included more dialogue between Pam and Jim about the decision, in which Pam brought up Jim's impulsive decision to buy his parents' house without consulting her in the episode "Frame Toby," but it was ultimately cut because they felt it added too much time to get to the resolution. A number of documentary-style interviews with Dwight about Michael's defection and his thoughts about Charles Miner were cut for length issues.

Immediately after "Two Weeks" was first broadcast, NBC Universal's The Office website DunderMifflinInfinity.com sent mass e-mail messages said to be from "Michael Gary Scott" encouraging people to join his new company, "The Michael Scott Paper Company." The message, which included a link to the website, said "As the manager of Dunder Mifflin, Scranton I learned two things: everything about the paper business and that Dunder Mifflin is a suckee company. I’m taking that expertness and creating The Michael Scott Paper Company. … I cannot promise success, but I will promise you the best effing time of your life!!!"

== Cultural references ==
Michael accidentally visits a website about actual monsters when trying to visit Monster.com, a popular employment site. During work, Michael drinks a combination of scotch and Splenda, an artificial sweetener; Michael had the same drink in the third season episode "Cocktails". Michael tries to get a job with Prince Family Paper Company only to find they have gone out of business; this is a reference to "Prince Family Paper", an episode from earlier in the fifth season, in which Michael and Dwight go undercover at Prince Paper to learn their company secrets and steal their clients. While flirting with Charles, Kelly said her family was so close they were like the Kardashians, a reference to the E! reality series, Keeping Up with the Kardashians.

Several reviewers compared Pam's decision to quit with Michael to that of Renée Zellweger's character in the 1996 film Jerry Maguire, and the final scene in which Michael and Pam go from excitement over their new company to concern about the future to the final moments of The Graduate. Shure, who said he is a fan of the movie scene, said it was not directly inspired by the film, but he was "painfully aware of the inevitable comparison"; he said the writers considered having Michael refer to the movie in the episode, but dropped it due to time constraints. The line spoken by Oscar, "Just like that, as mysteriously as he arrived, he was gone" was written by Office writer Mindy Kaling and was inspired by the Keyser Söze character in the 1995 film, The Usual Suspects.

== Reception ==
In its original American broadcast on March 26, 2009, "Two Weeks" was watched by 8.7 million overall viewers, and 5.8 million viewers among ages 18 to 49. The episode had a 4.5 rating and 11 share in the 18 to 49 demographic, making it NBC's top-rated show the week it aired.

"I sometimes worry that The Office doesn't hit its marks, either moving too far towards cringe or not far enough towards silliness, but last night's episode hit its emotional notes so squarely I wonder why I've ever doubted the show."

— Margaret Lyons,
Entertainment Weekly

"Two Weeks" received generally positive reviews. Alan Sepinwall of The Star-Ledger praised the episode and specific elements of it, like Michael wandering around the office drunk and many of the documentary-style interviews, like Charles talking about his effect on women, Toby comparing Michael to a movie on a plane and Kevin being too lazy to compliment Michael in person. But he said the episode was "elevated" by Michael and Pam forming a partnership at the end: "Steve Carell and Jenna Fischer are always brilliant in those moments when they have to show multiple emotions at once, so it was nice to finally see them get to do it side-by-side." Entertainment Weekly writer Margaret Lyons said "Two Weeks" offered a change that would keep the series fresh and, although she said it was "not a nonstop laugh riot", she said it "highlights what The Office does that few other shows ever even attempt: incredibly humane, subtle moments that contrast with the kind of chaos only ever borne of monotony."

Brian Howard of The Journal News said the episode flowed well and he liked the payoff at the end when Pam joined Michael's new paper company, but he said the moments with Michael crawling on the floor felt like "unnecessary padding". Nevertheless, he said, "I'm looking forward to rewatching this episode, probably the first time I've done that since 'Lecture Circuit: Part I'". Andy Shaw of TV Fodder said Michael was much more likable in "Two Weeks" than in other recent episodes, and said, "Steve Carell was at his best, with great throwaway lines and getting to the heart of Michael's love for Dunder-Mifflin and paper." Will Leitch of New York magazine said the episode marked a "major step" for the series and had some particularly sweet moments between Michael and Pam. He also particularly liked the moment when Charles Miner, who is played by the same actor who played drug dealer Stringer Bell on the HBO series The Wire, threatened to attack Michael: "Michael Scott being beaten up by Stringer Bell. That's one for the TV annals."

Rick Porter of Zap2it said the episode was "pretty good" and that Jenna Fischer was "fantastic", but he felt the episode was less outright funny than recent episodes. But Porter also said he had mixed feelings about Pam's decision to work for Michael and about the Charles Miner character, who he said might be too humorless and uncomfortable for the show. Travis Fickett of IGN felt it was disappointing and slow-paced compared to last week's episode "New Boss": "Things slow down a bit as we sort of repeat the awkwardness between Michael and new regional manager Charles Miner. It feels a bit like the episode is marking time – which is exactly what Michael is doing with his final two weeks on the job." "Two Weeks" was voted the eighteenth highest-rated episode out of 26 from the fifth season, according to an episode poll at the fansite OfficeTally; the episode was rated 7.74 out of 10.

Stuart Bass received a Primetime Emmy Award nomination for Outstanding Single-Camera Picture Editing for a Comedy Series. "Two Weeks" accounted for one of the ten Primetime Emmy Award nominations The Office received for the show's fifth season at the 61st Primetime Emmy Awards, which were held on September 20, 2009.
