= Weight Loss (The Office) =

- The Office episodes
- Episode nos.: Season 5 Episodes 1/2
- Directed by: Paul Feig
- Written by: Lee Eisenberg; Gene Stupnitsky
- Cinematography by: Randall Einhorn
- Editing by: Dean Holland
- Production code: 501/502
- Original air date: September 25, 2008
- Running time: 42 minutes

Guest appearances
- Amy Ryan as Holly Flax; Part 1: Dale Raoul as Ronni; Part 2: Rich Sommer as Alex

Episode chronology
← Previous "Goodbye, Toby"	Next → "Business Ethics"
- The Office (American season 5)

"Weight Loss" is the collective name for the first and second episodes of the fifth season of the American comedy television series The Office and the show's 73rd and 74th episodes overall. Written by Lee Eisenberg and Gene Stupnitsky, and directed by Paul Feig, the episode first aired as a single 60 minute show in the United States on September 25, 2008, on NBC. "Weight Loss" guest stars Amy Ryan as Holly Flax, Dale Raoul as Ronni, and Rich Sommer as Alex.

The series—presented as if it were a real documentary—depicts the everyday lives of office employees in the Scranton, Pennsylvania, branch of the fictional Dunder Mifflin Paper Company. In this episode, the whole office participates in a company-wide weight loss contest. Pam Beesly (Jenna Fischer) is in New York City for art school, which causes her and Jim Halpert (John Krasinski) to have to adjust to being temporarily apart. An awkward tension between Michael Scott (Steve Carell) and Holly (Amy Ryan) develops after she accepts a date with another man. Meanwhile, Angela (Angela Kinsey) and Dwight (Rainn Wilson) continue their secret relationship despite Angela's upcoming wedding to Andy Bernard (Ed Helms). Later, Jim asks Pam a very important question.

== Plot ==
The office partakes in a company-wide weight loss competition, with the prize of extra vacation days for the winning branch. The staff become over-competitive, especially Kelly Kapoor who stops eating and tries numerous diets, eventually passing out during one weigh-in. Corporate responds with a memo that staff should not resort to drastic weight loss measures. The Scranton branch loses the competition, although Stanley Hudson is proud of his individual results, and decides to take the vacation anyway.

Pam Beesly begins a three-month graphic design class in New York City. While Pam is away, she is replaced by a temp worker named Ronni, who is then fired by Michael Scott in favor of bringing Ryan Howard back in. Wanting to see Pam, Jim Halpert meets her for lunch at an interstate rest stop between Scranton and New York City. He proposes to her outside in the pouring rain, and she accepts ecstatically.

Plotting his return to the company, Ryan apologizes to various people around the office for his past behavior, while keeping a list of people who wrong him to take revenge on them when he is back on top. He apologizes to, and then proceeds to ask his former girlfriend Kelly Kapoor out, only to be rejected when she tells him that she is dating Darryl Philbin.

Holly Flax yells at Angela Martin for chastising Kevin Malone, mistakenly believing he has an intellectual disability. Kevin clarifies that he does not, and an embarrassed Holly apologizes and walks away. Holly continues to show interest in Michael, until she catches him talking to a pregnant Jan Levinson. Holly then goes out on a date with Oscar's yoga instructor, and buys Counting Crows tickets as a surprise for their next date. When he never calls her, Michael berates the yoga instructor to Holly's pleasure, then offers to buy the tickets from her only to tear them up.

Phyllis Lapin-Vance takes over the Party Planning Committee by blackmailing Angela with her knowledge of Angela and Dwight's affair. After Angela shoots down all of Andy's wedding ideas, she warms up to him until he tells her that he booked his a cappella band 'Here Comes Treble' to play at their wedding.

Toby Flenderson is in a Costa Rican hospital due to a neck injury while zip-lining.

== Production ==
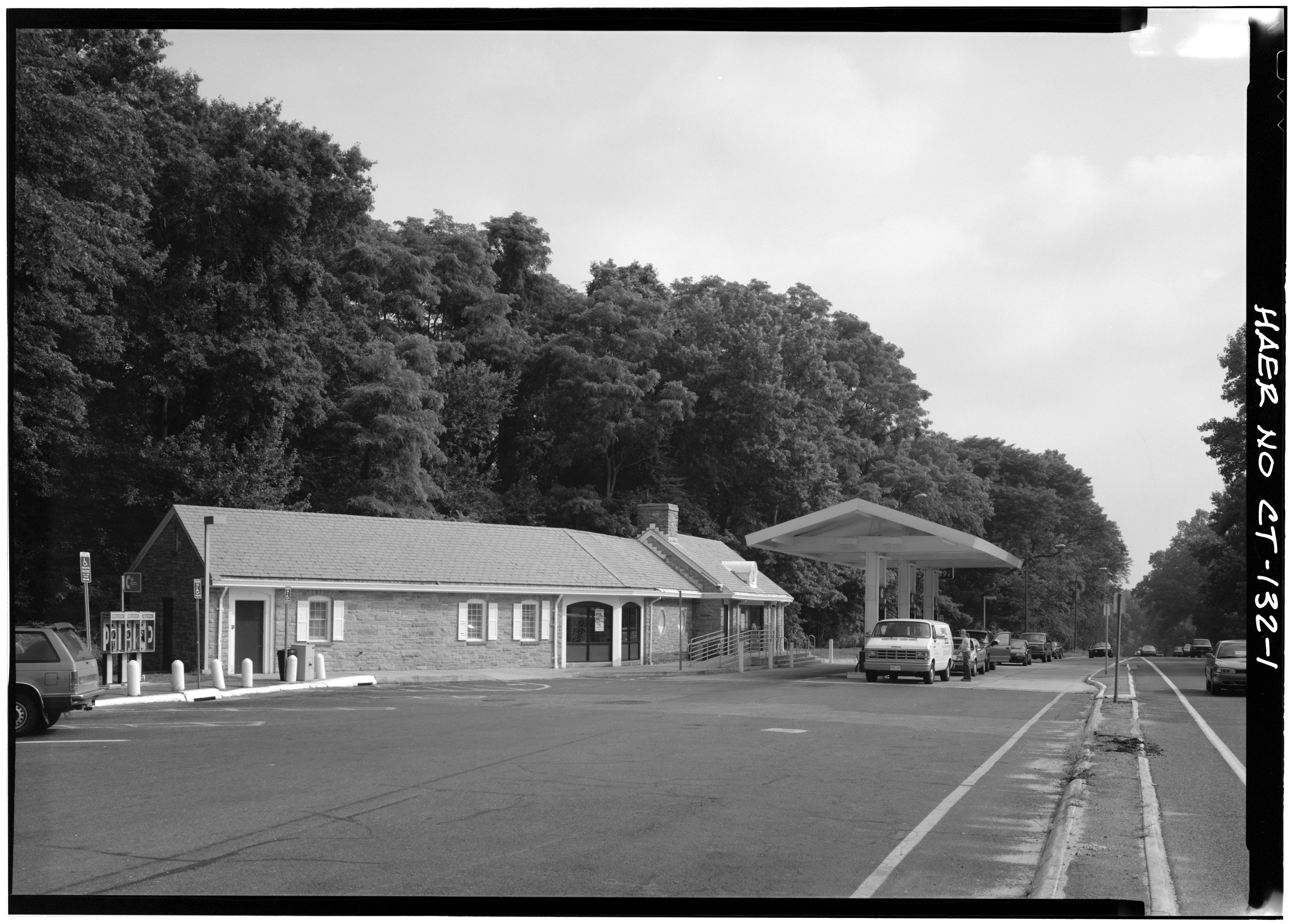
The production crew built a replica of a real rest stop along the Merritt Parkway in Greenwich, Connecticut, to film the proposal scene.

"Weight Loss" was directed by Paul Feig and written by Lee Eisenberg and Gene Stupnitsky. The show's creator and producer, Greg Daniels, proposed the idea of Jim proposing to Pam in a gas station parking lot, as well as the decision to include the proposal in the season premiere episode - instead of during a season finale - to catch viewers off guard.

The group electronic scale was custom-built for the episode. Though the costume designer considered reusing one of the sumo suits from the season 3 episode "Beach Games" for Michael's fat act (as Michael says he is doing during the episode), they ultimately decided to fit him for a fat suit instead. The fruit flies gathering in the vending machine were real, a variety brought in from Florida and bred to be sterile. The fruit was naturally rotted; for weeks the prop master kept an assortment of fruit on a table in preparation for the episode.

The proposal scene, which was filmed at a set built on an empty parking lot in Los Feliz, California, was the most expensive scene shot during the entire run of the show. The crew built a replica of an actual rest stop on the Merritt Parkway in Greenwich, Connecticut, that Daniels often visited as a child; the crew used Google Street View imagery to recreate the facade. They had first attempted to arrange filming at the real Merritt Parkway rest stop, but were turned away because the owner, ExxonMobil, had a blanket policy against filming. The prop gas station building was large enough for background actors to move around, and a four-lane racetrack was built in front, where a team of 35 professional drivers drove cars and semi trucks at 55 miles per hour. Rainfall was created using rain machines, and an artificial "wooded" background was added in pre-production in place of the mountainous California backdrop.

== Reception ==
In the 18–49 demographic, "Weight Loss" earned a 4.9/11 ratings share. The episode was watched by 9.1 million viewers.

The episode received critical acclaim, with praise mainly focusing on the episode's balance between comedy and character-driven moments, especially Jim's proposal to Pam. This scene ranked number 2 in phillyBurbs.com's top ten moments from the fifth season of The Office. Dwight and Angela carrying on their affair in the hidden corner of the warehouse during business hours ranked number 7 on that list. Writer Jen Weilgus described Dwight's line, "We done good in there, Half Pint," as the best quote of the season. Ryan's return as a temp in this episode, tied with his second return appearance in the episode "Dream Team", ranked number 5 in the list. Travis Fickett of IGN gave the episode a 9.2 of 10, indicating that it was "amazing". He wrote, "It's another terrific mix of character and comedy that is perfectly balanced," concluding that "The Office remains one of the funniest, best written, best performed and one of the best shows of TV. Period." Nathan Rabin, writing for The A.V. Club, graded the episode an "A−", giving particular praise to the development of the romance between Pam and Jim. "It was an episode full of big laughs and neat little character moments, as well as a number of gags rooted in camera placement. Ah, but I'm leaving out the big moment, that glorious milestone where years and years of flirtation, meaningful glances and missed chances finally paid off in a surprisingly satisfying, genuinely surprising beauty of a scene where Jim proposed to Pam outside a truck stop in the pouring rain."

Aubry Arminio of Entertainment Weekly also lauded the episode's more dramatic aspects over the comedic moments: "That’s what was so great about yesterday’s episode: I’ll admit I wasn’t rolling on the floor laughing, but I did find myself clutching my hand over my heart several times. Last night had those tender moments only The Office can pull off without seeming corny: Jim’s proposal in the rain in front of a rest stop, Michael pumping up Kelly’s self-esteem by having the staff point out her beauty (Creed: “Hell of an ass”), and Angela realizing that she's been terrible to Andy, then smooching in front of everyone." Oscar Dahl of BuddyTV lauded the episode, opining that it stayed true to the spirit of the show's previous four seasons. "The Office is the unique comedy in which characters evolve, story-lines take seasons to play out and the mythology is never dispensed at the expense of the humor. Five season in, and tonight's premiere was every bit as funny as anything from the previous four. It's a testament to the writers and the actors, and their continued focus on staying the course, sticking to what makes The Office perhaps the best and most consistent all-around comedy." Screen Junkies expressed hope for the season as a whole, stating "Everything that makes the show awesome is still there and firing on all cylinders, so I’m really looking forward to the rest of the season."

"Weight Loss" was voted the second highest-rated episode out of 26 from the fifth season, according to an episode poll at the fansite OfficeTally; the episode was rated 8.92 out of 10.
