= The Office (American TV series) season 5 =

Season of television series

The Office
- Season 5
- DVD cover
- Showrunners: Paul Lieberstein; Jennifer Celotta
- Starring: Steve Carell; Rainn Wilson; John Krasinski; Jenna Fischer; B. J. Novak; Ed Helms; Melora Hardin; Leslie David Baker; Brian Baumgartner; Creed Bratton; Kate Flannery; Mindy Kaling; Angela Kinsey; Paul Lieberstein; Oscar Nunez; Craig Robinson; Phyllis Smith
- No. of episodes: 28

Release
- Original network: NBC
- Original release: September 25, 2008 – May 14, 2009

Season chronology
- ← Previous; Season 4 Next → Season 6

The fifth season of the American television comedy The Office premiered in the United States in the 2008–2009 television season on NBC on September 25, 2008 and concluded on May 14, 2009. The fifth season consisted of 28 half-hours of material, divided into 24 half-hour episodes and two hour-long episodes. The Office is an American adaptation of the British TV series, and is presented in a mockumentary format, portraying the daily lives of office employees in the Scranton, Pennsylvania branch of the fictitious Dunder Mifflin Paper Company. The season stars Steve Carell, Rainn Wilson, John Krasinski, Jenna Fischer, and B. J. Novak, with supporting performances from Ed Helms, Melora Hardin, Leslie David Baker, Brian Baumgartner, Creed Bratton, Kate Flannery, Mindy Kaling, Angela Kinsey, Paul Lieberstein, Oscar Nunez, Craig Robinson, and Phyllis Smith.

The fifth season of The Office aired on Thursdays at 9:00 p.m. (Eastern). The season was released on DVD in a box set containing five discs featuring all 28 episodes with audio commentaries on select episodes. The DVD was released by Universal Studios Home Entertainment.

== Production ==
The fifth season of the show was produced by Reveille Productions and Deedle-Dee Productions, both in association with Universal Media Studios starting from late July 2008. The show is based upon the British series created by Ricky Gervais and Stephen Merchant, both of whom are executive producers on both the US and UK versions. The Office is produced by Greg Daniels, who is also an executive producer. Daniels would have a limited role in this season, not writing an episode, as he was busy writing his new show, Parks and Recreation which he co-created with Office writer/producer Michael Schur, who left the writing staff of The Office to focus on the new show. Returning writers from the previous season include Mindy Kaling, B. J. Novak, Paul Lieberstein, Lee Eisenberg, Gene Stupnitsky, Lester Lewis, Brent Forrester, Justin Spitzer, and Jennifer Celotta. This season saw many new additions to the writing staff, including Ryan Koh, Aaron Shure, Charlie Grandy, Anthony Q. Farrell, Warren Lieberstein, and Halsted Sullivan. Paul Lieberstein and Celotta were promoted to executive producers, with Lieberstein becoming the new showrunner, to take over from Daniels. Kaling, Novak, Eisenberg, Stupnitsky and Paul Feig were co-executive producers; Lewis and Forrester were consulting producers; and Spitzer and Grandy were producers.

This season featured 28 episodes directed by 16 directors. Feig, Jeffrey Blitz, Ken Kwapis, and Randall Einhorn each directed several episodes during the season, while Greg Daniels, David Rogers, Stephen Merchant, Jason Reitman, Dean Holland, Asaad Kelada, Ken Whittingham, and Paul Lieberstein directed an episode each. Writers Jennifer Celotta, Gene Stupnitsky and Brent Forrester each made their directorial debut, and series star Steve Carell directed his first episode.

== Season overview ==
Notable ongoing plots that affect the fifth season and beyond include:

- Jim Halpert's engagement to Pam Beesly
- Michael's relationship with HR rep Holly Flax, which ends when Holly is transferred to Nashua
- The Scranton returns of Ryan Howard and Toby Flenderson
- Pam going to art school in New York City
- Angela Martin's continuing affair with Dwight Schrute, despite her engagement to Andy Bernard
- The arrival of no-nonsense corporate employee Charles Miner to Scranton
- Michael quitting Dunder Mifflin to form his own paper company (The Michael Scott Paper Company), with Pam and Ryan joining Michael in his new venture
- The hiring of Kelly "Erin" Hannon as the new Scranton branch receptionist

== Cast ==
Many characters portrayed by The Office cast are based on the British version of the show. While these characters normally have the same attitude and perceptions as their British counterparts, the roles have been redesigned to better fit the American show. The show is known for its generally large cast size, with many of its actors and actresses known particularly for their improvisational work.

=== Main ===
- Steve Carell as Michael Scott, Regional Manager of the Dunder Mifflin Scranton Branch. Loosely based on David Brent, Gervais' character in the British version, Scott is a dim-witted and lonely man, who attempts to win friends as the office comedian, usually making himself look bad in the process.
- Rainn Wilson as Dwight Schrute, who, based upon Gareth Keenan, is the office's top-performing sales representative.
- John Krasinski as Jim Halpert, a sales representative, assistant manager, and prankster, who is based upon Tim Canterbury, and is in love with Pam Beesly, the receptionist.
- Jenna Fischer as Pam Beesly, who is based on Dawn Tinsley. She is shy, but in many cases a cohort with Jim in his pranks on Dwight.
- B. J. Novak as Ryan Howard, based on Ricky Howard and Neil Godwin, who at the end of the fourth season was arrested while acting as Vice President, North East Region and Director of New Media, returns to Scranton as a temp on the fifth season. On the episode "Frame Toby", Novak's character leaves the office to travel to Thailand. Novak actually took a leave of absence from the show to appear in Quentin Tarantino's film, Inglourious Basterds, although he resumed his role later in the season.

=== Starring ===
Kevin, Angela, Oscar, Meredith and Creed during the episode "Lecture Circuit"

- Ed Helms as Andy Bernard, a preppy salesman with anger issues.
- Melora Hardin as Jan Levinson, a former Dunder Mifflin employee and Michael's ex-girlfriend, who is only present at the beginning of the season.
- Leslie David Baker as Stanley Hudson, a grumpy salesman.
- Brian Baumgartner as Kevin Malone, a dim-witted accountant, based on Keith Bishop.
- Creed Bratton as Creed Bratton, the office’s strange quality assurance officer.
- Kate Flannery as Meredith Palmer, the promiscuous supplier relations representative.
- Mindy Kaling as Kelly Kapoor, the pop-culture obsessed customer service representative.
- Angela Kinsey as Angela Martin, a judgmental accountant and Dwight’s main love interest.
- Paul Lieberstein as Toby Flenderson, the sad-eyed human resources representative who left to Costa Rica on the fourth-season finale, who returns to replace Holly Flax.
- Oscar Nunez as Oscar Martinez, an intelligent accountant, who is also gay.
- Craig Robinson as Darryl Philbin, the warehouse manager.
- Phyllis Smith as Phyllis Vance, a motherly saleswoman.

=== Special guest stars ===
- Amy Ryan as Holly Flax, Michael's love interest.
- Idris Elba as Charles Miner, the new Vice President of the North East Region.

=== Recurring ===
- Andy Buckley as David Wallace, Dunder Mifflin’s CFO.
- Bobby Ray Shafer as Bob Vance, Phyllis’ husband, who runs Vance Refrigeration.
- Hugh Dane as Hank Tate, the building’s security guard.
- Lisa K. Wyatt as Lynn, Kevin's love interest.
- Ellie Kemper as Erin Hannon, the new receptionist after Pam left for the Michael Scott Paper Company. She is the new love interest of Andy.

=== Notable guests ===
- David Denman as Roy Anderson, a former warehouse worker and Pam’s ex-fiancé, who now works at a vitamin store.
- Wendi McLendon-Covey as Marie, a concierge at a hotel in Canada.
- Dan Bakkedahl as Roger Prince Jr., the son of the owner of Prince Family Paper.
- Rick Overton as William Beesly, Pam's father.
- Rashida Jones as Karen Filippelli, Jim’s ex-girlfriend, who is now regional manager of the Utica branch.
- Rob Huebel as A.J., Holly's boyfriend at the Nashua branch.
- Katie Aselton as the Glove Girl, an unnamed woman that Michael meets at a blood drive.
- Ranjit Chowdhry as Vikram, a telemarketer that Michael used to work with.
- Connie Sawyer as "Nana" Scott, Michael's grandmother.

== Reception ==
=== Ratings ===
The fifth-season premiere "Weight Loss" received a 4.9/11 in the Nielsen ratings meaning that it was seen by 4.9% of all 18- to 49-year-olds, and 13% of all 18- to 49-year-olds watching television at the time of the broadcast. This marked a rise in the ratings set by the fourth season finale, "Goodbye, Toby". The season reached a high with "Stress Relief" due to it airing after Super Bowl XLIII. The season finale, "Company Picnic" became the lowest-rated episode of the season with 6.72 million viewers and a 3.9 rating/12% share in the 18–49 demographic. Ratings taken at the end of the season placed it at #52 out of 193 programs. This marked a significant rise in the ratings from the previous season.

=== Review ===
The Office: Season Five received generally positive reviews. DVDTalk.com rated the season four stars out of five saying that "After a truncated and ever-so-slightly uneven fourth year, Season 5 of The Office stands tall as one of the finest to date. The show's effortless balance of drama, intrigue and pitch-perfect comedy remains remarkably consistent, thanks to strong performances, clever writing and a devoted creative team." Film.com gave the season a positive review saying "Season five reminds us why we continue to root for Michael Scott". Sitcoms Online reviewed the Season 5 DVD set, and in the final comments section of the review said "It's a great show, and a great set, and it'll be extremely interesting to see how the show is continued this fall. It's the funniest show on broadcast TV right now, in my opinion, and I highly recommend the fifth season." Travis Fickett of IGN stated that it "feels a lot like the downward slope of a great series. I don't believe this was a bad season, but it is a season that let us see the show's age and put the concept to the test." He appreciated the writers for trying to change the status quo calling it "both necessary and appreciated". He ultimately gave the season a 7.9/10. Alan Sepinwall of The Star-Ledger, while reviewing "Company Picnic", called the season "my favorite season of The Office to date" commenting, "I don't know that it's ever been this consistently satisfying, because the characters have become so richly-drawn, and because the writers [...] have really learned to trust their actors to convey so much emotion in really quiet moments".

=== Awards ===
The fifth season has received a significant number of nominations, including 10 for Emmy Awards, 3 for Teen Choice Award, and 2 for TCA Awards. The ten nominations for the 2009 Emmy Awards were announced on July 16, and include the categories: "Comedy Series" for the entire season; "Comedy Series Lead Actor" for Steve Carell for the episode "Broke"; "Comedy Series Supporting Actor" for Rainn Wilson in "Heavy Competition"; "Comedy Series Directing" for Jeffrey Blitz for the episode "Stress Relief"; "Comedy Series Editing" for Stuart Brass for "Two Weeks", Claire Scanlon for "Dream Team", and David Rogers and Dean Holland for "Stress Relief"; "Comedy Series Sound Mixing" for "Michael Scott Paper Company"; "Comedy Series Casting" for Allison Jones; "Interactive Media - Fiction" for 'The Office Media Experience, NBC.com. It won an Emmy for Outstanding Directing in a Comedy Series for Jeffrey Blitz for the episode Stress Relief.

The three Teen Choice Awards nominations were for the show, the actor and the actress categories. The Television Critics Awards nominations were for the "Outstanding Achievement in Comedy" and for "Individual Achievement in Comedy" categories. The show also received nominations from TCA for best TV of the decade for Comedy Series and two for Comedy Actor.

== Episodes ==
In the following table, "U.S. viewers (million)" refers to the number of Americans who viewed the episode on the night of broadcast. Episodes are listed by the order in which they aired, and may not necessarily correspond to their production codes.

No. overall	No. in season	Title	Directed by	Written by	Original release date	Prod. code	U.S. viewers (millions)
73	1	"Weight Loss"^{‡}	Paul Feig	Lee Eisenberg & Gene Stupnitsky	September 25, 2008	5001	9.34
74	2	"Weight Loss"^{‡}	Paul Feig	Lee Eisenberg & Gene Stupnitsky	September 25, 2008	5002	9.34
Over eight weeks of the summer, a Dunder Mifflin weight-loss initiative causes the branch to diet and become obsessed with their weight. Michael pursues a friendship with his new HR rep, Holly. Andy plans his wedding to Angela, while she continues her affair with Dwight. Jim misses Pam who attends art school in New York, and he finally proposes. A disgraced Ryan returns to the Scranton office as a temp.
75	3	"Business Ethics"	Jeffrey Blitz	Ryan Koh	October 9, 2008	5003	9.25
Following Ryan's recent scandal, Holly holds an ethics seminar. Everyone speaks freely about their unethical behavior at work and Meredith causes a rift between Michael and Holly when Meredith admits a supplier gives her discounts on products and steak coupons in exchange for sex. The staff ostracizes Holly, but when she is humiliated by the head of Human Resources, Michael once again supports her. Meanwhile, Jim makes Dwight comply with the company's "time theft" policy by timing every second of his activity.
76	4	"Baby Shower"	Greg Daniels	Aaron Shure	October 16, 2008	5004	8.28
Michael practices for the birth of Jan's baby by having Dwight go over possible birthing scenarios with a watermelon baby. When Jan arrives for the office baby shower, she has already had baby Astrid, excluding Michael from the process, and he feels disconnected from the baby. Meanwhile, Michael pretends to dislike Holly for Jan's benefit, but Jan senses their connection and asks Michael not to date Holly. Michael goes to Holly for comfort and they agree to date. The separation between Jim and Pam starts to take a toll on their relationship.
77	5	"Crime Aid"	Jennifer Celotta	Charlie Grandy	October 23, 2008	5005	7.98
Michael and Holly have sex in the office on a date, they forget to lock the main door which inadvertently leads to the office being robbed. Michael holds an auction to raise money for all the items lost. On Phyllis's advice, Dwight gives Angela an ultimatum to break up with Andy, which she refuses to do. Pam gets a part-time job at corporate to pay for art school, and Jim is further unsettled after Roy insinuates that he is losing her.
78	6	"Employee Transfer"	David Rogers	Anthony Q. Farrell	October 30, 2008	5006	9.51
When corporate transfers Holly to Nashua, Michael (with Darryl's help) moves her back to New Hampshire. Their plans to continue dating are dashed and they break up, and Darryl teaches Michael to sing the blues. Pam meets Jim's brothers, who pull a prank on Jim, which embarrasses her. Dwight torments Andy by becoming a fan of Cornell University. Pam is embarrassed when she is the only person at corporate wearing a costume on Halloween.
79	7	"Customer Survey"	Stephen Merchant	Lester Lewis	November 6, 2008	5007	8.55
Dwight and Jim are shocked when they receive poor marks on their annual customer survey reports. They learn that Kelly has sabotaged their scores for blowing off her America's Got Talent wrap party. Kelly and a sympathetic Michael relish their discomfort. Through Angela's manipulations, she and Andy book their wedding at Schrute Farms B&B. Pam and Jim spend every minute together using their Bluetooth phones, including Jim overhearing Pam's friend Alex asking her to stay in New York.
80	8	"Business Trip"	Randall Einhorn	Brent Forrester	November 13, 2008	5009	8.30
CFO David Wallace sends Michael to Winnipeg, Manitoba for business. Andy and Oscar accompany him and become unlikely friends when they drunk dial Angela. Although Michael makes the sale and has a one-night stand, he rebukes David for transferring Holly. Jim counts down the days until Pam gets back from art school; she fails a course but comes back to Scranton anyway. Ryan seduces Kelly, who in turn breaks up with Darryl.
81	9	"Frame Toby"	Jason Reitman	Mindy Kaling	November 20, 2008	5008	8.31
HR Rep Toby returns from Costa Rica, driving Michael insane. He and Dwight attempt to get Toby fired for cause by planting "drugs" (actually caprese salad) in Toby's desk. Pam is upset that someone in the office has made a mess in the microwave and will not clean it up. Jim surprises Pam by buying his parents' old house; despite its '70s decor, Pam loves it. Ryan breaks up with Kelly to travel to Thailand.
82	10	"The Surplus"	Paul Feig	Gene Stupnitsky & Lee Eisenberg	December 4, 2008	5013	8.46
The office must spend a $4,300 surplus or lose it in next year's budget. Factions break out and court Michael to get what they want—Oscar and Jim want a new photocopier, Pam, Stanley, and others want new chairs. They finally agree on the chairs to prevent Michael from earning a bonus by returning the surplus. Dwight takes Angela and Andy to Schrute Farms to settle wedding plans. In a mock ceremony, Dwight secretly weds Angela. Angered at his deception, she plans to have the wedding annulled.
83	11	"Moroccan Christmas"	Paul Feig	Justin Spitzer	December 11, 2008	5010	8.76
Phyllis's Moroccan-themed holiday party is interrupted when Meredith's hair catches on fire during a drunken bellydance; Michael stages an intervention and attempts to force Meredith into rehab. Dwight makes a killing selling a popular Christmas toy—"Princess Unicorn". Phyllis continues to torment Angela on the Party Planning Committee. When she revolts, Phyllis shocks everyone by revealing Angela and Dwight's affair to everyone (except Andy).
84	12	"The Duel"	Dean Holland	Jennifer Celotta	January 15, 2009	5011	8.49
The office is tense because Andy still has not found out about Angela's affair with Dwight. After Michael tells him, Dwight and Andy plan a duel. When they realize Angela has been sleeping with them both, each dumps her. In New York, Michael travels to corporate to meet with David Wallace, who wants to know Michael's methods as the Scranton branch is actually doing well. Not surprisingly, Michael has no insight.
85	13	"Prince Family Paper"	Asaad Kelada	B. J. Novak	January 22, 2009	5012	8.76
By request of David Wallace, Michael and Dwight go undercover to investigate rival paper company Prince Paper. As they are a small, family-owned operation made of an extremely nice family, Michael has a difficult time handing over their findings to Wallace. Meanwhile, the rest of the office holds a debate to settle a question: is Hilary Swank hot? The office is tied six to six when Michael off-handedly casts the winning vote for "yes".
86	14	"Stress Relief"^{‡}	Jeffrey Blitz	Paul Lieberstein	February 1, 2009	5016	22.91
87	15	"Stress Relief"^{‡}	Jeffrey Blitz	Paul Lieberstein	February 1, 2009	5017	22.91
Dwight stages a fire drill which causes a panic and Stanley has a heart attack. With stress levels high, Michael tries a number of ways to get his employees to relax before discovering that he is the number one cause of stress at work. He stages on a no-holds-barred roast of himself, but feels hurt at the jokes. Andy, Pam and Jim watch an unlicensed movie with special guest stars Jack Black, Jessica Alba, and Cloris Leachman. Pam's parents are going through marital troubles and separate after her dad hears how much Jim loves Pam.
88	16	"Lecture Circuit: Part 1"	Ken Kwapis	Mindy Kaling	February 5, 2009	5014	8.48
Michael goes on a speaking tour of the other branches to explain Scranton's relative success, accompanied by his driver, Pam. At the Utica branch, the speech goes poorly, but Pam and a married, pregnant Karen reach closure, inspiring Michael to travel to the Nashua branch for closure with Holly. Back at the office, Dwight and Jim — now the heads of the party planning committee — forget Kelly's birthday, and attempt to make amends. Andy develops a crush on Stanley's client.
89	17	"Lecture Circuit: Part 2"	Ken Kwapis	Mindy Kaling	February 12, 2009	5015	9.00
In part two, Michael and Pam arrive in Nashua, where Holly is off for a few days. Michael feels devastated when he learns that she has a new boyfriend and Pam is forced to finish the lecture. Michael finds a computer file addressed to him on Holly’s computer; Pam reads it and tells him that Holly still cares for him. Dwight and Jim continue to struggle to throw Kelly a party, but ultimately make her happy by introducing a new theme of either getting to watch TV or take a nap for one hour. Angela's new nanny cam causes a stir when the staff see her bizarre interaction with her pets.
90	18	"Blood Drive"	Randall Einhorn	Brent Forrester	March 5, 2009	5018	8.54
It's Valentine's Day at the office. Michael is attracted to a woman who loses a glove at a Valentine's blood drive; Cinderella-like, he tries to track her down. The staff share their worst break-up stories and band together to host a "Lonely Hearts Party" where they root for Michael's would-be romance. Jim and Pam have lunch with Phyllis and Bob Vance, which turns awkward when they hear the Vances having sex in the bathroom.
91	19	"Golden Ticket"	Randall Einhorn	Mindy Kaling	March 12, 2009	5019	7.67
Without asking corporate marketing, Michael goes forth with an idea to put "golden tickets" into boxes of paper for clients to redeem for a 10% discount for the entire year, inspired by Willy Wonka & the Chocolate Factory. Instead, it causes trouble for Dunder Mifflin when all the five tickets end up with the same big client. David is angered, so Michael tries to pin the blame on Dwight. Andy, Jim, and Pam give Kevin differing advice on wooing Lynn, the woman he met at the Valentine's mixer.
92	20	"New Boss"	Paul Feig	Lee Eisenberg & Gene Stupnitsky	March 19, 2009	5020	8.07
Michael clashes with the new, no-nonsense Regional Vice President Charles Miner (guest star Idris Elba), who goes so far as to dissolve the party planning committee and cancel Michael's 15th anniversary party. Jim gets off on the wrong foot with Charles as well when caught in a prank. Meanwhile, both Kelly and Angela develop crushes on Charles. After confronting David Wallace about his party, Michael quits Dunder Mifflin.
93	21	"Two Weeks"	Paul Lieberstein	Aaron Shure	March 26, 2009	5021	8.65
As Michael wraps up his two final weeks, he goofs off even more than usual. Pam feels unfullfilled despite success at programming the new photocopier. When Michael decides to open his own paper company (with none of the staff joining him despite his pleas), an angry Charles has him escorted off the premises—only to have Pam join in his new venture in sales.
94	22	"Dream Team"	Paul Feig	B. J. Novak	April 9, 2009	5022	7.32
Michael and Pam use a list-based agenda to struggle through establishing their new company, including establishing an office in the Dunder Mifflin building and hiring a bleach blond Ryan and briefly, Vikram from Michael's telemarketing job. Dwight goads Jim into facing off with Charles in a soccer match when he joins in his officemates' brownnosing over Charles' sports passion. Michael is soon able to convert a large closet in the Business Park building into his office headquarters.
95	23	"Michael Scott Paper Company"	Gene Stupnitsky	Justin Spitzer	April 9, 2009	5023	8.02
Michael, Pam, and Ryan chafe working in such close quarters. After hosting a Paper & Pancakes luncheon, they are about to call it quits when Pam makes her first sale for the company. Dwight and Andy's unlikely friendship is tested when they are both attracted to the new receptionist Erin. Jim spends his day trying to figure out what Charles means by his requested "run down". Includes an alternate title sequence featuring The Michael Scott Paper Company.
96	24	"Heavy Competition"	Ken Whittingham	Ryan Koh	April 16, 2009	5024	8.37
Dwight, finding a new hero in Charles, clashes with Michael as each tries to steal the other's clients. After trying to sell Jim and Pam on his failed wedding plans, Andy tries to provide for all of Jim's emotional needs. Jim takes the opportunity to prank Andy, but also reassures him he will find love again. Michael ends up stealing Dwight’s biggest client.
97	25	"Broke"	Steve Carell	Charlie Grandy	April 23, 2009	5025	7.28
Jim learns Charles is a suckup while Charles finally recognizes Dwight's bizarre personality. Although Michael, Pam, and Ryan have landed a number of clients, they learn their company's business model will not sustain beyond a month and they will fail. Dwight learns about Michael’s company’s failure but Jim sabotages his plan of telling Charles. David Wallace investigates the seeming success of Michael's company, and Michael, Pam, and Ryan hide their failure long enough to engineer a buyout. Michael is given his old job back, and Pam and Ryan are given jobs in sales.
98	26	"Casual Friday"	Brent Forrester	Anthony Q. Farrell	April 30, 2009	5026	7.41
Michael tries to solve a dispute over customers when the sales team feels that he is biased to the previous Michael Scott Paper Company employees. Pam and Ryan are forced to return the customers and with fewer customers, Michael is forced to fire one of them. Pam is kept on as Ryan is once again a temp. Meanwhile, Toby confronts several employees who take the term casual Fridays too loosely.
99	27	"Cafe Disco"	Randall Einhorn	Warren Lieberstein & Halsted Sullivan	May 7, 2009	5027	7.85
To break the staff of the focus Charles instilled in them, Michael opens a cafe-disco in the downstairs office to relieve stress. While initially resistant, all the staff (even Angela) join as Kelly and Andy bond in a dance-off. Pam and Jim plan to elope but later reconsider. Phyllis suspects Bob will have an affair, but drops her suspicions as they sound absurd saying them aloud. Cafe disco ends up being a hit.
100	28	"Company Picnic"	Ken Kwapis	Jennifer Celotta & Paul Lieberstein	May 14, 2009	5028	6.77
At the annual Dunder Mifflin company picnic, Michael and Holly are reunited. They perform a skit where they inappropriately announce the closing of the Buffalo branch, but Michael decides not to tell her that he loves her. The Scranton branch plays well in the volleyball tournament and discover that Pam is a pro at the sport. While getting an x-ray for a sprained ankle, Pam (with Jim) learns that she is pregnant.

^‡ denotes an hour-long episode (with advertisements; actual runtime around 42 minutes).

== Media release ==
The fifth season was released as box sets on DVD and on Blu-ray on September 9, 2009. The 5 DVD box set includes, aside from the episodes, multiple deleted scenes, episode commentaries by various members of the production team, a "Gag Reel", a presentation of the show made by the Academy of Television Arts & Sciences, show ads that ran during the Super Bowl and during the 2008 Beijing Olympics, as well as several webisodes. The Blu-ray version has 4 discs and includes, in addition to the DVD content, BD-LIVE, a program which allows access to BD-Live Center for accessing online content such as trailers and downloading exclusive content. Another software included is "One-Liner Soundboard" which allows users to create audio mixes from stringing one-liners and quotes from the show, and to share these online via BD-LIVE. On the same date, The Office: Seasons 1–5 Collection was also made available.

The Office: Season 5 — DVD	The Office: Season 5 — Blu-ray
Set details	Set details
28 episodes; 5-disc set; Video: anamorphic widescreen; Audio: English (Dolby Digital 5.1 Surround); Subtitles: English SDH, Spanish; Total running time: 10 hours and 4 minutes; Release date: Region 1 - September 8, 2009	26 episodes; 4-disc set; Video: widescreen; Audio: English (DTS-HD Master Audio 5.1); Subtitles: English SDH, Spanish; Total running time: 10 hours and 4 minutes; Release date: Region A – September 8, 2009
Special features	Special features
Audio commentary on select episodes; Commercials aired during the Super Bowl and during the 2008 Olympics; Deleted scenes; "Gag Reel"; Academy Of Television Arts & Sciences Presents The Office; Webisodes.	all the DVD bonus contents; BD-Live; One-Liner Soundboard
