= Stress relief (disambiguation) =

Stress relief is the concept of relieving psychological stress. Stress relief may also refer to:

- Stress Relief (The Office), a 2009 TV episode
- "Stress Reliever", a track the 2012 Ne-Yo album R.E.D.
- Stress management
- Annealing (materials science), in metallurgy
- Heat treating#Stress relieving, in metallurgy
