= Lecture Circuit =

- The Office episodes
- Episode nos.: Season 5 Episodes 16/17
- Directed by: Ken Kwapis
- Written by: Mindy Kaling
- Cinematography by: Matt Sohn (Part 1); Randall Einhorn (Part 2)
- Editing by: David Rogers
- Production code: 514/515
- Original air dates: February 5, 2009 (Part 1); February 12, 2009 (Part 2)
- Running time: 42 minutes

Guest appearances
- Part 1: Rashida Jones as Karen Filippelli; Adam Jamal Craig as Rolando; Erica Tazel as Julia; Part 2: Rob Huebel as A.J.

Episode chronology
← Previous "Stress Relief"	Next → "Blood Drive"
- The Office (American season 5)

"Lecture Circuit" is a two-part episode of the American comedy television series The Office. They constituted the sixteenth and seventeenth episodes of the fifth season and the 88th and 89th overall episodes of the series. The first episode originally aired on NBC on February 5, 2009, and the second on February 12.

During both episodes, Michael and Pam visit the various branches of Dunder Mifflin to make business lectures, and in particular visit the Utica branch – where Jim's ex-girlfriend Karen Filippelli is regional manager, and the Nashua branch, where Michael's ex-girlfriend and the love of his life, Holly is an H.R. rep. In both episodes, Jim and Dwight hit a snag as the new heads of the Party Planning Committee when they forget Kelly's birthday. In the first episode, Andy develops a crush on a customer, and in the second episode, Angela's unhealthy obsession with her cats is spotlighted when she installs a nanny cam.

Both episodes were directed by Ken Kwapis and written by Mindy Kaling, who also plays Kelly Kapoor in the show. "Lecture Circuit" included guest appearances by screenwriter Dan Goor, comedian Rob Huebel and actress Rashida Jones, who reprises her role of Karen, a regular character from the third season. Although the character Holly Flax played a major part in the storyline, actress Amy Ryan did not appear in "Lecture Circuit". The episodes received generally positive reviews. According to Nielsen Media Research, the first part was watched by 8.4 million viewers and the second part was watched by 8.89 million viewers.

== Plot ==
=== Part one ===
Michael Scott is asked to visit the Dunder Mifflin branches to lecture about his success in Scranton. He and Pam Beesly, who is coming along as his assistant and driver, plan to visit every branch except Nashua because Michael is not ready to face his ex-girlfriend Holly Flax, who works there. They first visit the Utica branch, where former Scranton employee Karen Filippelli is now regional manager. Pam, who is engaged to Karen's ex-boyfriend Jim Halpert, fears the encounter will be awkward, but Karen is now married and pregnant, and the two get along very well. When Pam reveals her and Jim's engagement, Karen offers genuine congratulations. Michael's lecture in Utica proves to be a disaster when he teaches the employees a trick for memorizing names which insults everybody. Nevertheless, Pam is ecstatic to have found closure with Karen. Later, on the road, Michael tells Pam that he never found closure with Holly and, at Pam's suggestion, they blow off the other lectures and drive to Nashua.

Back in Scranton, Jim and Dwight Schrute have been named the reluctant heads of the Party Planning Committee by Michael due to previous fights between Phyllis Vance and Angela Martin. Jim and Dwight prove terrible at the job. When Kelly Kapoor chastises them for forgetting her birthday, they try to make it up to her by throwing a party but do a poor job, choosing horrible decorations and forgetting Kelly's age. Dwight reads her file and learns Kelly spent time in juvenile hall.

Andy Bernard finds himself attracted to Julia, a potential client who is talking with Stanley Hudson. Andy repeatedly acts awkwardly in front of Julia and accidentally sets off her car alarm while trying to look inside and find out what music she likes. Andy admits his attraction to her to Stanley, who then gives the potential client over to Andy in exchange for two of his clients. After walking her out to the car, Andy tries to kiss her, but is rebuked. Andy apologizes and mentions that he just got out of a relationship. Julia claims she also just got out of a relationship and Andy starts feeling a connection, but she still rejects him and he loses the account.

=== Part two ===
Michael and Pam arrive at the Nashua branch, only to learn Holly is away on a human relations retreat. They also learn Holly is dating one of the Nashua salesmen, A.J. Deeply upset, Michael is at first unable to go forward with the presentation, but Pam encourages Michael to do the best presentation possible so people will tell Holly about it. He starts the presentation, but it falls apart when Michael starts asking A.J. intimate questions about his relationship with Holly. Michael leaves in the middle of the talk, leaving Pam to awkwardly finish the presentation. When Michael goes to Holly's desk he cuts a sleeve off her sweater, and notices a document on her computer called "Dear Michael", which he copies onto his flash drive. Later, at a diner, Michael tells Pam about the letter, but she insists reading it would be violating Holly's trust. Pam herself reads the letter and does not tell him the exact contents, but reassures him Holly still has feelings for Michael and it is not over, giving Michael the closure he sought.

In Scranton, Dwight loudly confronts Kelly about her time in juvenile hall, which turns out to be for stealing the boat of an ex-boyfriend when she was 14. Kelly also declares she hates the cake Jim picked for her, which is completely blank; he later decorates it and spells her name incorrectly as "Kelley". When Kelly insists the party needs a theme, Jim and Dwight are unable to think of anything. They finally settle on offering her one hour of napping or one hour of watching television. She loves the idea and chooses the nap.

Angela buys a $7,000 cat with the money she received from selling Andy's engagement ring, and sets up a nanny cam so she can monitor her cats from work. She is horrified to see one of her other cats having sex with the new cat, and rushes home to stop it. Kevin Malone and Oscar Martinez watch Angela arrive home on the nanny cam screen, and become disgusted when Angela starts licking the cat to help clean it. Angela eventually returns to work and coughs up a hairball. Oscar claims the image will haunt him for the rest of his life.

== Production ==
"Lecture Circuit" was directed by Ken Kwapis and written by Mindy Kaling, who also plays Kelly Kapoor in the show. The cold open, in which Michael abuses the P.A. feature on the office's phones, was written by Aaron Shure. It was inspired by Shure's time working on Everybody Loves Raymond, when the production staff discovered their phones had access to a P.A. system.

Part one includes a cameo performance by Rashida Jones, a regular cast member during the third season, during which she played Jim Halpert's love interest Karen Filippelli. "Lecture Circuit" aired just two months before Jones began her regular role as Ann Perkins in the NBC comedy series Parks and Recreation, which was created by Office producers Greg Daniels and Michael Schur. Dan Goor, a future writer for Parks and Recreation, made a cameo as Karen's husband in the photographs featured in the part one episode. Rob Huebel, a comedian best known for the MTV sketch comedy series Human Giant, guest starred as Holly's boyfriend, A.J. Amy Ryan, who played Holly Flax in previous episodes, did not appear in either "Lecture Circuit" episode, although the decision by Michael and Pam to visit Holly at the end of the first episode led to speculation about whether she would appear in the second.

== Continuity and cultural references ==
Michael handing out candy bars during his lectures is a reference to the third season episode, "Business School", in which Michael passed out chocolate bars during his speech to a business school classroom. Michael expresses regret for insulting Tony Gardner, the heavyset man who briefly transferred from the Stamford branch of Dunder Mifflin to the Scranton branch, who Michael drives to quit by trying to lift onto a table for an orientation demonstration in the third-season episode, "The Merger". Among the Dunder Mifflin branches Michael visits is Nashua, New Hampshire, where Holly works, and Utica, New York, where Karen works. Michael said he can only prepare for his lectures by listening to "silence or Sam Kinison", an American stand-up comedian known for his extreme and vulgar sense of humor. Michael said he learned the Pledge of Allegiance, the lyrical oath of loyalty to the United States flag, by setting the lyrics to the rhythm of "Old McDonald Had a Farm", a children's song about the various animals on a farm. When learning the name of Holly's boyfriend, Michael asks, "What kind of name is A.J.? What, do you race cars?" - a reference to famed racing driver A. J. Foyt and others. During one lecture, Michael and Pam both do impressions of the protagonist from Forrest Gump, the 1994 film starring Tom Hanks as a mentally handicapped man. Michael also uses the title from the films Good Morning, Vietnam (at his Nashua lecture by saying "Good morning, Vietna...shua!") The Princess Bride, Gone with the Wind and Jerry Maguire in his lectures. Holly's computer has a screensaver with images of Ed Grimley, the nerdy character with a cowlick played by comedian Martin Short in the comedy shows SCTV and Saturday Night Live.

Angela said she sold Andy's engagement ring on eBay, an online auction website. Creed gives Andy romantic advice and says, "This is how I got Squeaky Fromme", a reference to the Manson family member who tried to assassinate U.S. President Gerald Ford. A picture of President George W. Bush appears on a fake three-dollar bill Creed gives Jim to pay for the party. Creed suggests Kelly watch The Bonnie Hunt Show, a syndicated talk show hosted by actress Bonnie Hunt. Andy puts Splenda, an artificial sweetener, into Stanley's coffee because he has adult onset diabetes, a disorder characterized by high blood glucose. Andy sings Julia a song by Feist, the Canadian singer and songwriter, after he spots a Feist CD in her car. Michael takes a document file from Holly's computer that was created with Microsoft Word, the Microsoft word processing program. Pam said she hates the notion of even Al-Qaeda hating her, a reference to the Islamist terrorist organization that committed the September 11 attacks. Kelly confesses she went to juvenile detention in Berks County, Pennsylvania, at age 14 for doing something "like Thelma & Louise, but with a boat", a reference to the 1991 road movie starring Geena Davis and Susan Sarandon on the run from their troubled, caged lives. Jim said during a birthday trip to a museum at age seven, his father bought him a plastic toy triceratops, a three-horned dinosaur from the Late Cretaceous Period, which Dwight insists is not a good dinosaur. Pam remembers the name of one audience member by comparing her to k.d. lang, the Canadian singer known for her extremely short hair.

== Reception ==
In its original American broadcast on February 5, 2009, the first part of "Lecture Circuit" was seen by 8.4 million viewers, according to Nielsen Media Research. The original broadcast for the second part on February 12 was seen by 8.89 million viewers. The second episode received a 4.3 rating/11 share among viewers aged between 18 and 34, and a 3.8 rating/9 share among viewers aged between 18 and 49, numbers which were close to the season's average rating. The first episode received a 5.0 rating/14 share among viewers aged between 18 and 34, and a 4.3 rating/11 share among viewers aged between 18 and 49. Both ratings were three-tenths of a drop from the previous episode, "Stress Relief", which was heavily viewed because it immediately followed the broadcast of Super Bowl XLIII on NBC. The drop in ratings led some media outlets to speculate that the post-Super Bowl ratings boost was only temporary and would not help The Office in the long run.

Both parts of Lecture Circuit were nearly perfect, and if we were to take them together ... they'd easily constitute the finest hour-long episode in this show's history. [Writer Mindy Kaling] nailed the characterizations, the interactions, the tossed-off one-liners, the weird-yet-realistic scenarios. I wonder how much it helps that she's out on the acting floor every day, getting attuned to her costars' rhythms?

— Henning Fog
Entertainment Weekly

Both episodes of "Lecture Circuit" received generally positive reviews. Whitney Pastorek of Entertainment Weekly described them as "nearly perfect", calling them the two best episodes of the season so far: "[Writer Mindy Kaling] nailed the characterizations, the interactions, the tossed-off one-liners, the weird-yet-realistic scenarios...I wonder how much it helps that she's out on the acting floor every day, getting attuned to her costars' rhythms?" Josh McAuliffe of The Times-Tribune of Scranton, Pennsylvania, said the first "Lecture Circuit" episode was his favorite episode of the fifth season so far, which he said provided several laugh-out-loud moments and a poignancy with Michael's decision to find Holly. McAuliffe described the second episode as a "satisfying wrap-up" and said Michael's outburst during the lecture was "one of the most painful Michael meltdown moments in the show's history". Alan Sepinwall of The Star-Ledger said the first episode perfectly balanced drama and comedy. He particularly complimented the chemistry between both Carell and Fischer and between Krasinski and Wilson, and said he was particularly pleased to receive closure over the Karen character. But Sepinwall said the second episode felt padded with "material I would have been fine seeing as deleted scenes". Although he described Carell's reaction to the news that Holly still has feelings for him as a "wonderful performance", Sepinwall also said the subplot involving Angela's cat was particularly unfunny and that subplot with Jim and Dwight, "so brilliant last week, ran out of steam quickly here."

Nathan Rabin of The A.V. Club said the episode "was full of laughs but had a bit of a bittersweet aftertaste" and had "one hell of a cliffhanger" ending. Rabin praised the Jim and Dwight teaming in the first episode, but said the plot line of Michael's lectures were predictable and "promised more than it delivered". Rabin said the second episode "wrapped up everything up nicely [and] delivered larfs aplenty"; he particularly enjoyed the subplot involving Angela's cats, and the fact that it "left the door open for Holly's return". Will Leitch of New York magazine praised the cliffhanger ending of the first episode and said he was pleased the Holly character was still in the show's equation. Leitch also praised Ed Helms, who "is nailing the right combination of ridiculous and sad-sack pathos", although he said he "[was not] nearly as inspired" by the Jim and Dwight subplot. Leitch also enjoyed the second episode, particularly the "legitimately sweet moment" when Pam tells Michael that Holly still has feelings for him. Leitch was less praiseworthy of the Angela subplot involving her cats, and said the character "appears to have officially gone batshit insane." Travis Fickett of IGN criticized the first episode and said, "I'm starting to wonder if the show is showing signs of winding down." Fickett said the idea of Michael giving awkward lecture tours felt old and familiar, so much so that "I was convinced it was a repeat". He also said the Jim and Dwight idea was funny, but "nothing the show hasn't tapped before". Likewise, Fickett described the second episode as "average Office and feels overly familiar without really blazing any new ground." He also said it was disappointing Holly did not appear, and that Angela felt like a "caricature" in her subplot.

The scene with Angela licking her cat was heavily criticized by reviewers, prompting some observers to describe it as the moment when The Office jumped the shark, a phrase used to describe the moment of downturn for a previously successful television show. When asked about this during an interview, actor Oscar Nuñez responded, "No show is 'Jump the Shark'-proof, but there have been other moments on The Office that I think were more 'Jump the Shark' than that." He did not specify what other moments he meant.
