= Prince Family Paper =

- The Office episode
- Episode no.: Season 5 Episode 13
- Directed by: Asaad Kelada
- Written by: B. J. Novak
- Cinematography by: Matt Sohn
- Editing by: Dean Holland
- Production code: 512
- Original air date: January 22, 2009

Guest appearances
- Andy Buckley as David Wallace (voice); Dan Bakkedahl as Roger Prince, Jr.; Dan Desmond as Roger Prince, Sr.

Episode chronology
← Previous "The Duel"	Next → "Stress Relief"
- The Office (American season 5)

"Prince Family Paper" is the thirteenth episode of the fifth season of the American comedy television series The Office. The show's 85th overall episode, it originally aired on NBC in the United States on January 22, 2009. In the episode, Michael and Dwight go undercover to seek information on a family-owned business competitor, and Michael has a crisis of conscience when they turn out to be very nice people. Meanwhile, the others in the office passionately debate whether actress Hilary Swank can be considered "hot".

The episode was directed by Asaad Kelada and written by B. J. Novak, who also plays Ryan on the show. The script addresses the Darwinistic nature of capitalism in its portrayal of the larger corporation Dunder Mifflin threatening a small mom-and-pop business, as well as societal definitions of beauty in the differing arguments regarding Swank's attractiveness. Dan Bakkedahl makes a guest appearance as the business owner's son.

The episode received generally mixed reviews. According to Nielsen Media Research, "Prince Family Paper" was seen by 8.74 million viewers, a slight increase from the previous week's episode, "The Duel".

== Plot ==
Dunder Mifflin CFO David Wallace enlists Michael Scott to report on the success of a small family-owned paper company named Prince Paper, that works in an area where Dunder Mifflin has never acquired clients. Michael brings Dwight Schrute to help gather information. Michael visits posing as a potential customer named "Michael Scarn", while Dwight pretends to request a job. The owner, Roger Prince, gives Michael the company's customer list to use as a reference, and Michael and Dwight leave triumphantly.

However, Michael damages his car while exiting his parking space, which catches the attention of the Prince family. They come out to help fix the car. Michael is moved by their kindness and has a change of heart regarding giving the customer list to David, while Dwight is instead amused. Back at the office, Dwight tries to convince Michael he cannot let his heart get in the way of business. Michael agrees to send the list and his information to Wallace, but then tries to get rid of the list. Dwight chases Michael down and takes the list from him, causing Michael to give in. David calls Michael to congratulate him on getting the list. Michael claims he is feeling a "bittersweet" moment: bitter because he potentially ruined a decent family, but sweet because he satisfied David Wallace.

The rest of the office debates whether Hilary Swank is "hot", feeling they cannot resume work until a majority takes one side or the other. Kevin Malone leads the group voting she is not hot, claiming she looks like a "monster". Jim convinces Kevin to switch sides by having him imagine Hilary kissing him, only for Kevin to switch back, saying the debate is whether she is hot, not whether he would have sex with her. Angela Martin votes "hot" to spite Kevin and his crude remarks. Kelly Kapoor, who believes herself less attractive than Swank, gets emotional when Toby Flenderson defends his "not hot" vote. Pam Beesly argues they should not let the Kevins of the world decide who is hot. Oscar Martinez gives a presentation about the structure of Swank's facial features, concluding she is "attractive... not hot." An uncharacteristically uplifting Stanley Hudson votes hot, saying that pointing out flaws is no way to live life. The sides remain tied until Michael, oblivious of their debate, passes by the pictures on the wall and casually calls her hot.

== Production ==
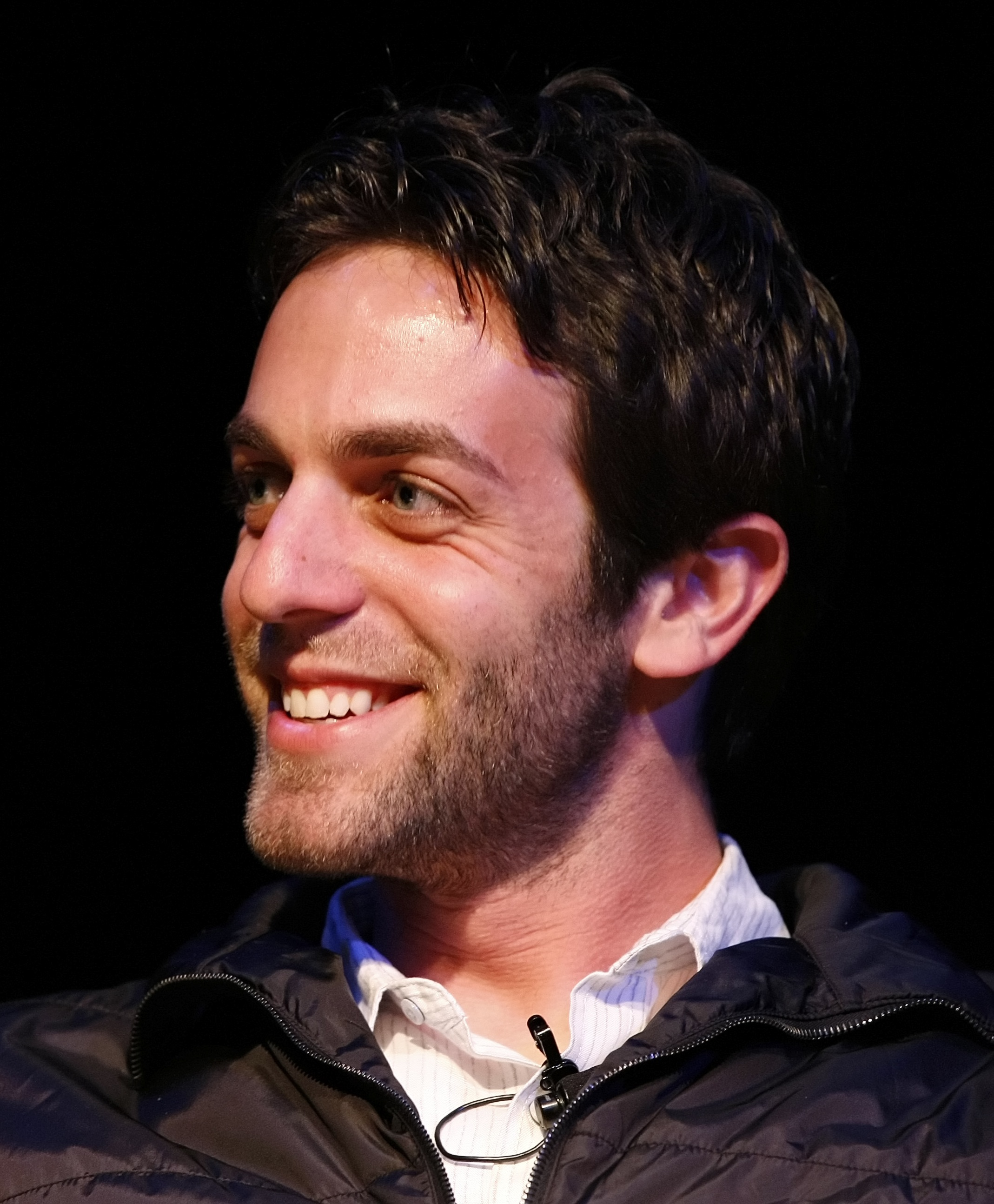
"Prince Family Paper" was written by B. J. Novak, who also plays Ryan on the show.

"Prince Family Paper" was directed by Asaad Kelada and written by B. J. Novak, who also plays Ryan Howard on the show. The episode portrays capitalism as Darwinistic in nature, particularly through its portrayal of the larger corporation Dunder Mifflin threatening the small mom-and-pop business Prince Family Paper, as well as societal definitions of beauty in the differing arguments regarding the hotness of Hilary Swank.

Dan Bakkedahl, a comedian best known as a correspondent from the Comedy Central comedy program The Daily Show, made a guest appearance as Robert Prince, Jr., the son of the Prince Paper owner. When Michael infiltrates Prince Family Paper, he identifies himself as Michael Scarn. This is a reference to the second season episode "The Client", in which Pam discovers an action film screenplay starring a character based on himself named Agent Michael Scarn.

== Cultural references ==
Robert Prince tells Michael he started his business after Vietnam, a reference to the Vietnam War, but Michael mistakes it for a reference to the country itself and says he has heard it is a nice place. During one scene, Michael said to David Wallace, "What'chu talking 'bout, Wallace?" in the style of Gary Coleman's catchphrase "What'chu talking 'bout, Willis?" from the sitcom Diff'rent Strokes. While discussing Hilary Swank, Kevin said he finds her so unattractive that he expected her to have a real penis in Boys Don't Cry, the 1999 drama film in which Swank played a transgender man. When Angela votes that Hilary Swank is hot, she declares her "a female Boris Becker", a reference to the German professional tennis player. Michael plans to meet Dwight at the IHOP pancake eatery after they visit Prince Family Paper, but Dwight insists IHOP is "socialist" and prefers the American restaurant chain Denny's.

== Reception ==
=== Ratings ===
In its original American broadcast on January 22, 2009, "Prince Family Paper" was watched by 8.74 million overall viewers, about a five percent increase in viewership over the previous episode, "The Duel". "Prince Family Paper" received a 5.3 rating/14 share among viewers aged between 18 and 34, and a 4.6 rating/11 share among viewers between 18 and 49. It was outperformed by CSI: Crime Scene Investigation on CBS, which was seen by 17.53 million households, and Grey's Anatomy on ABC, which was seen by 14.25 million households, although commentators said The Office still fared well against the tough competition. "Prince Family Paper" earned higher ratings than the Fox series Bones, which moved to Thursday for the first time and drew 7.5 million viewers.

Tonight was about as inconsequential as The Office gets. With the exception of Michael’s moral quandary as to whether or to take advantage of the naivety of a comically friendly rival paper company it was all about gags, some inspired, some relatively arbitrary.

— Nathan Rabin, The A.V. Club

=== Critical reception ===
"Prince Family Paper" received generally mixed reviews. Travis Fickett of IGN called it one of the show's better Michael-and-Dwight centric episodes, and called the chase between them "a classic scene and perfectly executed". Fickett also praised several character moments, like Kelly's breakdown over whether Hilary Swank is hot, but said the Swank subplot was less interesting than the main story. Brian Howard of The Journal News said he appreciated that the script had Michael follow through on betraying the Princes, rather than deciding to spare them, because he felt it was more realistic. Howard said, "They didn’t let Michael off the hook. Instead the writers took a dark and dirty turn toward the truly tragic, in the literal sense of the word." He also praised the Hilary Swank subplot as funny and a realistic conversation topic among officemates, although he admitted it was "relegated to almost buffer status" to the main plot. Alan Sepinwall, television columnist with The Star-Ledger, said Michael's conflicted feelings about betraying the Prince family came up too late and resolved too abruptly to work well, and that the chase between Michael and Dwight was a poorly constructed "misfire". However, he called the subplot about Hilary Swank "genius with a capital G".

TV Squad writer Jay Black praised the main plot, and wrote, "I was delighted that the trip to the Prince Family Paper Company became a test of Michael's morals rather than the usual exercise in his stupidity." Black said Dwight's attempts to get Michael to give up the client list were among the best set of scenes for the season. However, Black said the Hilary Swank subplot suffered in comparison, and felt like a vain attempt to find something for the supporting cast to do. The A.V. Club writer Nathan Rabin was disappointed with "Prince Family Paper", calling it overly dependent on throwaway gags and describing it as "about as inconsequential as The Office gets". Rabin complimented the opening gag with Jim and Dwight, but said it "felt like the kind of gag the show has pulled off dozens, if not hundreds of times, before". Alynda Wheat of Entertainment Weekly said it was not one of the strongest Office episodes and that the script took a particularly mean tone with the Prince Family Paper subplot, but that it also included some enjoyable moments like Jim's prank against Dwight in the opening scene. Will Leitch of New York magazine was very critical of the episode, especially the Hilary Swank subplot (which he said "sounded like a conversation B. J. Novak had with himself at a party and submitted as a backup script") and the fact that the episode had nothing to do with the show's ongoing plotlines.

=== Hilary Swank's reaction ===
Hilary Swank said of the episode in an interview with Time magazine: "I'm not a big television watcher, but definitely everyone made me aware of it. It's flattering anytime someone mentions you. But I don't think of myself in terms of that." She elaborated later in the interview: "There is so much [emphasis] put on the way we look, which is interesting, going back to the Office question. Are you hot, or are you not? It really does a disservice. There's so much more to life than looking a certain way."
