= Moroccan Christmas =

- The Office episode
- Episode no.: Season 5 Episode 11
- Directed by: Paul Feig
- Written by: Justin Spitzer
- Cinematography by: Randall Einhorn
- Editing by: Richie Edelson
- Production code: 510
- Original air date: December 11, 2008

Episode chronology
← Previous "The Surplus"	Next → "The Duel"
- The Office (American season 5)

"Moroccan Christmas" is the eleventh episode of the fifth season of the television series The Office and the show's eighty-third episode overall. The episode aired in the United States on December 11, 2008, on NBC.

It is the third Christmas-themed episode of The Office and the first in two years, as 2007's planned edition was abandoned due to the 2007–2008 Writers Guild of America strike.

In this episode, Phyllis throws a Moroccan-themed Christmas party as head of the Party Planning Committee, infuriating former head Angela. The party takes a dark turn when Meredith gets drunk and accidentally sets her hair on fire. Meanwhile, Dwight makes money by taking advantage of the latest toy craze, a Princess Unicorn doll.

== Plot ==
Phyllis Vance throws a Moroccan-themed Christmas party as head of the Party Planning Committee. Alcohol is served at the party, and Meredith Palmer gets so intoxicated that she accidentally sets her hair on fire while dancing. Dwight Schrute puts out the fire with an extinguisher. Michael Scott then stages an intervention. When Meredith continues to deny her alcoholism, the rest of the office find it best to go back to the party. Michael and Meredith agree to go out for a drink, but he actually takes her to a rehabilitation center. Meredith tries to escape, but Michael grabs her and drags her in. However, the staff will not check anyone in against their will, so Michael and Meredith drive back to the office.

Dwight has been performing research to determine what will be the most popular toy of the current Christmas season: a doll named "Princess Unicorn". Dwight buys every doll he can find and sells them for $200 each to desperate parents who waited until the last minute to buy their kids presents. Toby Flenderson wants to buy a doll for his daughter, Sasha, so he can one-up his ex-wife. However, Darryl Philbin has already purchased the last one. Toby begs Darryl to the verge of tears, and Darryl offers to sell it to him for $400. Toby tells him that he has only $200 with him, but Darryl allows him to pay him back later. He is taken aback when the doll he gets from Darryl is a black version of the doll, but decides not to complain.

Phyllis orders Angela Martin to do various tasks for the party (such as preparing a plate of bread and hummus), puts away her Nativity scene, and removes the Christmas tree (as neither of those are in the theme of Moroccan Christmas). When Phyllis tells Angela to bring back the Christmas tree after Michael and Meredith leave, Angela refuses. She points out that Angela's affair with Dwight is the one hold Phyllis has on her, and she is confident that Phyllis would not give that up over something so minor. However, Phyllis immediately announces Angela and Dwight's affair to the office. Everyone is shocked by the revelation, except for Dwight, who seems proud of himself. Andy Bernard, however, is absent for Phyllis' announcement, having been in the annex teaching himself to play a sitar. He returns to the party to play "Deck the Halls" on the sitar, before Angela asks him to take her home. The rest of the office is still speechless at Phyllis' announcement and neglect to reveal Angela's secret to Andy.

== Production ==
"Moroccan Christmas" was written by Justin Spitzer and directed by Paul Feig. Kate Flannery said shooting this episode was "maybe the most fun I have ever had working in front of a camera". Although Flannery has done her own stunts in previous episodes, including when she was struck by a car in the fourth season premiere "Fun Run", a stuntwoman was used for the scenes in which her hair catches fire in "Moroccan Christmas".

== Cultural references ==
Shortly after Meredith's hair catches fire, Kevin calls her "fire girl". This is a reference to the second season episode "The Fire", in which then-temp Ryan Howard accidentally sets a fire in the office, earning himself the nickname "fire guy". When Meredith angrily declares she is fine during her intervention, Michael refers to two entertainers when he responds, "Was John Belushi fine? Was Bob Hope fine?" While Michael is bartending during the party, he makes Jim a drink containing orange juice and vodka. Though commonly known as a screwdriver, Michael ignorantly refers to it as an "Orange-Vod-Juice-Ka", implying that he thinks he was the first person to concoct it.

== Reception ==
This recipe for classic Office awkwardness doesn’t quite work — it feels kind of wrong and weird, even if the image of Michael dragging Meredith by her arms across the floor into the waiting room sounded funny. Everyone seemed to be trying too hard. Maybe an intervention scene just can't be funny.

— Will Leitch, New York magazine

Phyllis's takeover of the Party Planning Committee and the subsequent fight with Angela ranked number 9 in phillyBurbs.com's top ten moments from the fifth season of The Office.

Brian Howard of The Journal News was mixed in his review of "Moroccan Christmas". He praised the cold open scene, Toby's reaction to the doll and Andy's reaction at the end of the episode. But Howard said he did not enjoy the Moroccan Christmas party theme, and felt scenes of Meredith's alcoholism and Michael dragging her to rehab were more awkward than funny. "Moroccan Christmas" received generally mixed reviews. Alan Sepinwall, television columnist with The Star-Ledger, was highly complimentary toward "Moroccan Christmas", which he said featured "consistent hilarity mixed in with some of the sharpest emotion we've ever gotten from a non Jim & Pam story". Sepinwall called it a strong episode for the Dwight, Andy, Meredith, and Phyllis characters, and particularly complimented the acting of Phyllis Smith. TV Guide writer Shahzad Abbas called it an "excellent episode all around", referring to the intervention scene and the fighting among Phyllis and Angela as "really intense stuff". Abbas said he looked forward to seeing the new developments unfold, and said Ed Helms had "never been better with his 'where's these people's Christmas spirit' reaction".

New York magazine writer Will Leitch criticized the episode. He claimed that the main story between Meredith and Michael seemed forced and did not work. Leitch particularly disliked the Phyllis subplot, writing that her negative behavior toward Angela was out of character and ineffective.
