= Stress Relief (The Office) =

- The Office episodes
- Dwight wearing a face of the CPR dummy he ripped off, in reference to The Silence of the Lambs (1991)
- Episode nos.: Season 5 Episodes 14/15
- Directed by: Jeffrey Blitz
- Written by: Paul Lieberstein
- Cinematography by: Randall Einhorn
- Editing by: Dean Holland (Part 1); David Rogers (Part 2)
- Production code: 516/517
- Original air date: February 1, 2009
- Running time: 42 minutes

Guest appearances
- Part 1: Andy Buckley as David Wallace; John Hartmann as Kendall; Robin Lynch as Rose; Part 2: Rick Overton as William Beesly; Bobby Ray Shafer as Bob Vance

Episode chronology
← Previous "Prince Family Paper"	Next → "Lecture Circuit"
- The Office (American season 5)

"Stress Relief" is a two-part episode of the American comedy television series The Office. It constitutes the fourteenth and fifteenth episodes of the fifth season and the 86th and 87th overall episodes of the series. Both episodes were directed by Jeffrey Blitz and written by Paul Lieberstein, who also plays Toby Flenderson.

In this episode, Dwight stages a fire in the office to test the office's fire safety skills, but things go from bad to worse when Stanley suffers a heart attack, causing Michael to come up with ways to relieve stress in the office, including a comedic roast of himself. Meanwhile, Andy, Jim, and Pam watch an illegally downloaded movie at work starring Jack Black, Jessica Alba and Cloris Leachman, and Pam's father moves in with her and Jim temporarily due to an argument with Pam's mother.

Both parts of "Stress Relief" originally aired together on February 1, 2009 on NBC, immediately following NBC's broadcast of Super Bowl XLIII, and The Office writers and producers sought to attract newcomers to the series with the expected increase in viewership. Guest stars Black, Alba and Leachman do not interact with the regular characters themselves, but rather appear in a film within the episode. The Office creator Greg Daniels said this was done to keep the episode more grounded in reality.

The episode received widespread acclaim, with Time magazine declaring it the best overall television episode of any series in 2009. The episode is considered a favorite by many fans of the series. Many commentators particularly praised the chaotic cold open scene, in which Dwight panics his co-workers with a simulated fire as part of a twisted safety demonstration. Because it aired following the Super Bowl, "Stress Relief" was the most viewed episode of The Office with 22.9 million viewers according to Nielsen Media Research during its original broadcast. It won the Primetime Emmy Award for Outstanding Directing for a Comedy Series, and received another nomination for Outstanding Single-Camera Picture Editing for a Comedy Series.

== Plot ==
Annoyed that none of his co-workers paid attention to the fire safety seminar he gave last week, Dwight Schrute tries another approach by sealing the office exits shut, cutting the phone lines and starting a fire in a trash can. Dwight calmly explains the proper safety procedures as the panicked employees try to flee. Dwight eventually reveals it was just a drill, but Stanley Hudson suffers a heart attack and collapses. Dwight is reprimanded by Dunder Mifflin CFO David Wallace, and Michael strips him of his position as safety officer.

After Stanley is released from the hospital, his doctors warn him to keep his stress levels under control. Michael arranges a CPR training session for the employees, but they are too easily distracted and the lesson proves fruitless. Dwight destroys the expensive CPR dummy to "extract the organs" for organ donation, then wears its face, earning another rebuke from David. Dwight is ordered to apologize to his co-workers and get signatures acknowledging that they forgive him, but after he openly declares that his apology is insincere and denies that he is responsible for Stanley's heart attack, they refuse to sign. With tensions running high in the office, Michael tries to calm his workers down with yoga and meditation sessions. However, Michael realizes he is actually the source of his employees' stress when the beeping of Stanley's stress reader quickens the closer Michael gets to him. The same occurs when Oscar holds the stress reader.

Michael, to resolve the stress, organizes a comedic roast of himself in the warehouse. Dwight tricks most of the employees into signing his apology letter by pretending it is a sign-in sheet, but Phyllis Vance uncovers it and refuses to sign. Each of the office and warehouse workers gleefully take jabs at Michael, who initially enjoys the jokes, but grows increasingly hurt and offended, storming out of the warehouse. Michael takes a personal day, much to the concern of his employees, and spends time at a playground to reflect. Dwight tricks Phyllis into signing his apology letter by bribing a mailman to ask her to sign for a fake package. Michael returns to the office, where he roasts each of his co-workers with one-liners, causing Stanley to laugh heartily. Michael tells his employees that they are the reason he got into the paper business, and they applaud him.

Meanwhile, Pam Beesly's parents are going through a rough patch in their marriage, and Pam's father is staying with her and Jim. Pam asks Jim to convince her father to work things out. However, shortly after they talk, her father seeks a separation. She later confronts her father about why he left her mother. When Pam returns to the office, she tells Jim her father left because Jim told him how much he loves Pam, causing him to recognize his own lack of love for his wife in comparison. Pam comes to terms with the separation and tearfully embraces Jim. As this goes on, they view a pirated movie titled Mrs. Albert Hannaday with Andy Bernard. The film stars Jack Black, who is engaged to a character played by Jessica Alba, but falls in love with her elderly grandmother, played by Cloris Leachman. Andy confuses Jim and Pam's comments on her parents' situation as to the characters in the film, leading him to conclude they are "movie geniuses" finding hidden depths in the film. The movie ends with Jack Black visiting Cloris Leachman with flowers and a new walker, only to discover her affair with another young man.

== Production ==
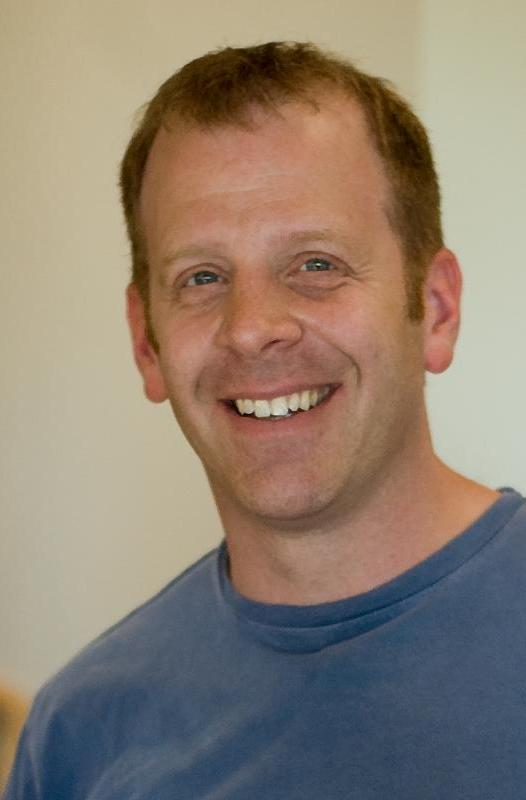
The Office actor and producer Paul Lieberstein wrote "Stress Relief".

"Stress Relief" was directed by Jeffrey Blitz and written by Paul Lieberstein, who also plays Toby Flenderson on the show. The episode originally aired on NBC in the United States on February 1, 2009, immediately after the broadcast of Super Bowl XLIII. NBC decided to air The Office after the Super Bowl, rather than another show, due to positive feedback the series received from short promo commercials it aired during the 2008 Summer Olympics. Some criticized the decision to place an episode of The Office, an already established NBC series, after the Super Bowl instead of a new show, and suggested it meant the network lacked any exceptional new material.

In writing the script for the episode, Lieberstein said he sought to appeal to newcomers to the series and attract them to the show, without alienating regular viewers: "We wanted to do a stand-alone comedy episode that could bring people in." Lieberstein said the script drew less attention to long-standing story arcs, which new viewers would not understand. Lieberstein said, "It almost had an air of a pilot in a way, where we had to reintroduce everything. We wanted it to be extremely funny and extremely funny up front." The Office creator Greg Daniels said he felt the episode had to focus on physical comedy and easily accessible set pieces. Daniels said, "I looked at all the shows that followed the Super Bowl in years past and I feel that a comedy would be a good choice in the current climate. People want to laugh so we're trying our best to supply some laughs." Actor Rainn Wilson said of the episode, "It's a great opportunity for people to revisit the world of The Office and hopefully get into our style of comedy."

The two parts of "Stress Relief" ran an hour long (including commercials), compared to the typical half-hour length of most The Office episodes. Since the end of the second season, the series had begun occasionally showing longer episodes (which they dubbed "super-sized") on special occasions. Unlike other episodes of The Office, "Stress Relief" included an extended main title sequence that included the names and images of the entire supporting cast of the series, in order to afford them recognition in anticipation of the high post-Super Bowl viewership. The opening scene, in which the characters frantically scramble to escape the Dunder Mifflin office due to what they believe is a fire, took about a day-and-a-half to shoot. It took much longer than the average 45 minutes of shooting time for a scene of that length due to the amount of stunt work involved. Due to the pressure of following the Super Bowl, actress Jenna Fischer said, "I don't think we've ever worked so hard on an episode in the history of our show." The Office actor and writer B. J. Novak, who did not appear in "Stress Relief", said of the episode, "It's awesome. After this airs, people are going to refer to the Super Bowl as the Pre-Office Football Spectacular."

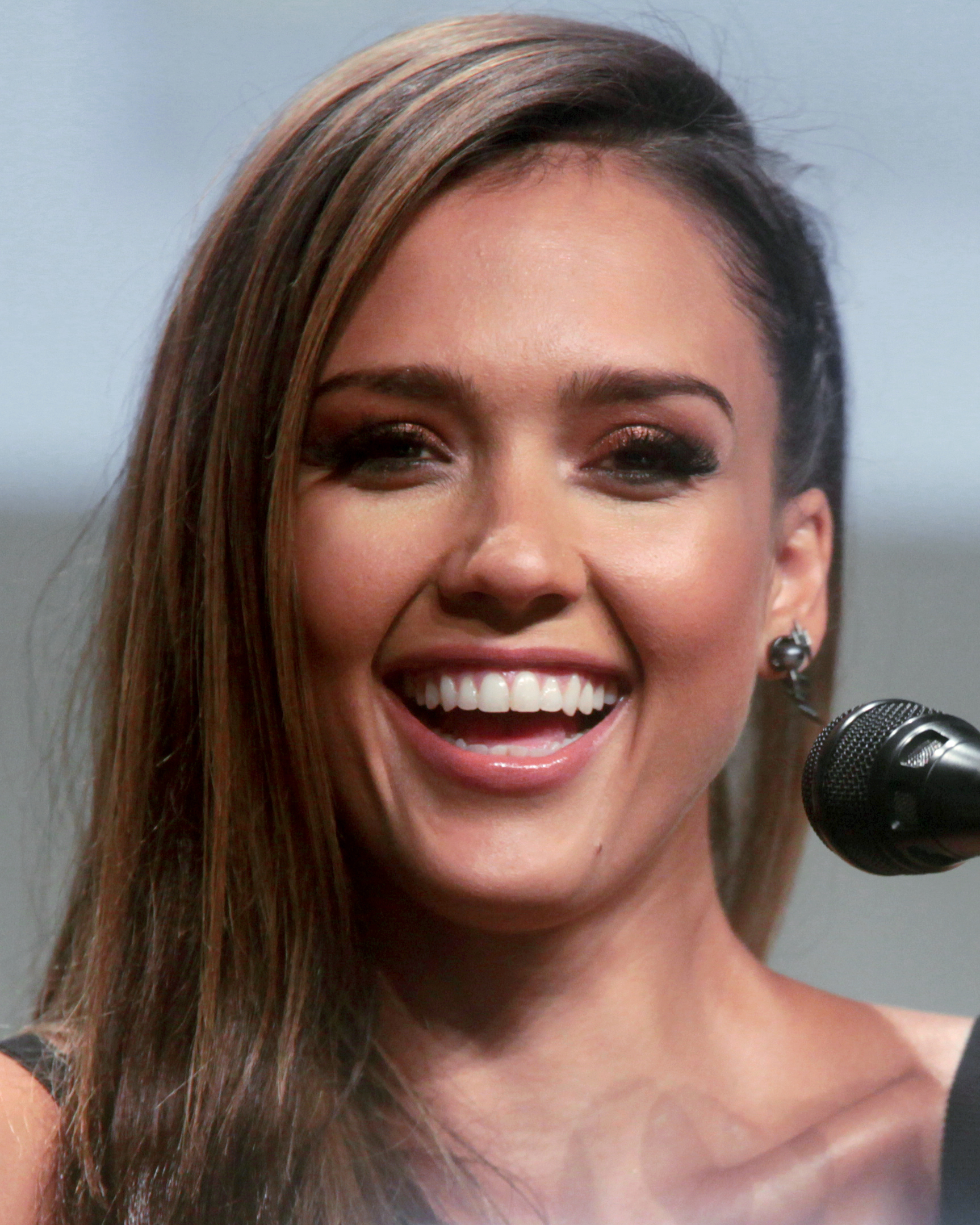
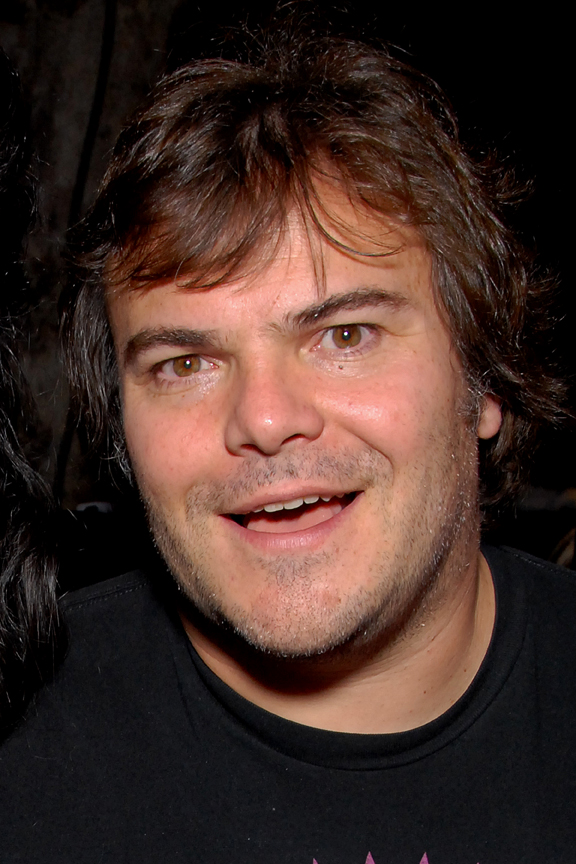
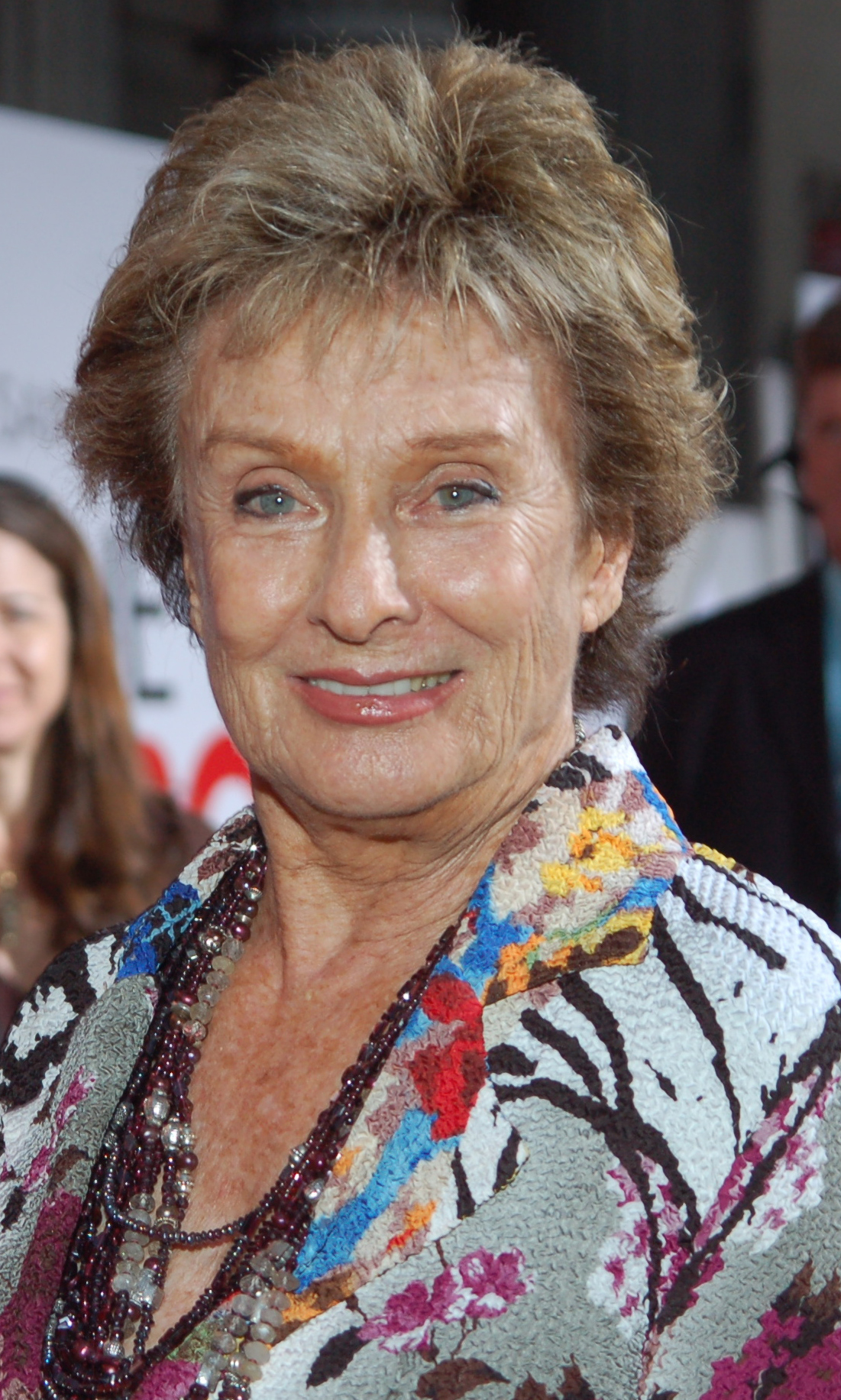
Jessica Alba, Jack Black, and Cloris Leachman make guest appearances in "Stress Relief".

In anticipation of particularly high viewership due to the Super Bowl, NBC officials encouraged The Office producers to feature celebrity guest appearances in the episode. Jack Black, Jessica Alba and Cloris Leachman all made guest appearances in "Stress Relief" as a result. However, they do not interact with the cast and characters of The Office, but rather appear separately in a bootleg film called Mrs. Albert Hannaday, which the characters watch within the episode. Greg Daniels said this was done because it "helps keep the show grounded and less like I Love Lucy". Lieberstein also said the casting decision made sense because, "If we're just casting some salesman that comes into the office and it's Jack Black, it's hard to believe that." Steve Carell said of Leachman's performance, "She is that extra seasoning. That extra spice to the pot that makes for a delicious comedy gumbo."

== Cultural references ==
Just before Dwight starts his fire simulation, he said his co-workers previously failed to listen because he made a presentation on the computer program Microsoft PowerPoint, of which he said, "PowerPoint is boring". Michael refers to Barack Obama, the first African American president of the United States, to Stanley while he is suffering a heart attack by shouting, "Stanley! Barack is president! You are black! Stanley!" A deleted scene further addresses Obama's election, with Michael praising the choice and Darryl, with Darryl half-jokingly telling the white office workers what will change for them (they no longer have to pretend to like jazz, and Morgan Freeman won't get any more acting work because "he's more for you guys"). Michael calls an employee from the Red Cross, an international humanitarian movement, to conduct a lesson about CPR. The instructor suggests they pump the heart to the tune of "Stayin' Alive", a disco song by the pop band, the Bee Gees, but Michael mixes the song up with "I Will Survive" by Gloria Gaynor. At the end of the lesson, Dwight cuts the face off the CPR dummy and places it on his face in the manner of Hannibal Lecter, a fictional cannibalistic serial killer who cut the face off a man and wore it as a mask in the 1991 thriller film, The Silence of the Lambs. Watching Mrs. Albert Hannaday, Andy says the Cloris Leachman character was originally supposed to be played by the much younger actress, Nicole Kidman, and the last-minute replacement prompted a minor overhaul in the film's script. The songs "You Make My Dreams" by Hall and Oates, "All Out of Love" by the soft rock duo Air Supply, "Have a Little Faith in Me" by singer-songwriter John Hiatt, and "Lady" by Little River Band play during scenes in Mrs. Albert Hannaday.

Michael describes the roast as an event in the style of televised comedy specials that air on the cable network, Comedy Central. In describing the upcoming roast, Michael says he plans to call YouTube, an online video sharing website, to record the event. During the roast, Pam says Michael's penis is so small, "If it were an iPod, it would be a Shuffle", a reference to the smallest of the Apple Inc. portable media player brands. Kelly said she would rather kiss Lord Voldemort, the hideous antagonist of the Harry Potter novels and films, than Michael. Andy sings a song about Michael, "What I Hate About You", to the tune of the rock song by The Romantics, "What I Like About You". Angela makes a joke, "If you put sunblock on a window, you might be Michael Scott", which is modeled after the "you might be a redneck" one-liner jokes by comedian Jeff Foxworthy. While roasting his co-workers at the end of the episode, Michael says to Andy, "Cornell called and they think you suck", a reference to Cornell University, the Ithaca, New York college Andy attended.

== Ratings ==
In its original American broadcast on February 1, 2009, "Stress Relief" was viewed by 22.9 million viewers in 13.34 million homes, according to Nielsen Media Research, making it the most watched episode of The Office and the only episode to reach over 20 million viewers. The episode drew a 10.6 rating and 14.46 million viewers between the ages 18 and 49. It more than doubled the show's previously highest rating in the age group, and constituted the largest 18–49 rating for an NBC entertainment telecast in four-and-a-half years, since the tenth season finale of the medical drama series ER on May 13, 2004. An estimated 37.7 million viewers watched at least six minutes or more of "Stress Relief". As expected, The Office benefited highly from following the broadcast of Super Bowl XLIII, which was seen by 98.7 million average viewers, making it the most watched Super Bowl in history at the time.

== Critical reception ==
"Stress Relief" received generally positive reviews. Time magazine named it the best overall television episode of any series in 2009. "Stress Relief" was voted the third highest-rated episode out of 26 from the fifth season, according to an episode poll at the fansite OfficeTally; the episode was rated 8.89 out of 10. Stanley's heart attack in response to Dwight's fake fire drill ranked number 10 in phillyBurbs.com's top ten moments from the fifth season of The Office. Many critics particularly praised the opening scene, in which Dwight panics his co-workers by simulating a fire. The sequence included scenes such as Kevin looting a vending machine amid the chaos, Michael throwing a nearby projector out of the conference room window to call for help, Oscar's legs crashing through the ceiling as he tries to crawl out, Angela tossing her cat through an open ceiling tile, Jim and Andy using the copier as a battering ram, and the latter's reaction to a series of popping caps: "The fire is shooting at us!"

"Beyond the brilliant opening, the show featured a little bit of everything that makes The Office so wonderful, in a way that didn't really require previous knowledge to appreciate, but that also didn't spoon-feed things in a way that would annoy the veteran audience."

— Alan Sepinwall
The Star-Ledger

Alan Sepinwall, television columnist for The Star-Ledger called it a "balls to the wall, gut-busting, amazing Office episode", and called the fire opening scene "not only the best Office pre-credits sequence ever, but an all-time sitcom classic". Sepinwall said "Stress Relief" was accessible to newcomers and regular viewers, and displayed both the comedic and human sides of the characters. He said the only drawback of the episode was the Mrs. Albert Hannaday subplot, which he felt was an unnecessary gimmick added solely to accommodate the guest stars. TV Guide writer Shahzad Abbas wrote, "This was one of my favorite episodes ever. It had me laughing the whole way through." Abbas particularly praised the fire opening scene and the final scene in which Michael insults everybody, which he called "a very satisfying ending to the roast saga". He called the Black/Leachman romance "creepy and hilarious", but described the Jim and Pam romance subplot as the weak link of the episode.

David Krone of the Los Angeles Daily News said although he had mixed feelings about the fifth season so far, he found "Stress Relief" to be "one of the season's best efforts". Krone specifically praised the Jim and Pam subplot and Dwight's character, adding, "It's a pretty perfect way to unwind – or, if your team lost, to become reanimated – after the Super Bowl." Rick Ingebritson of The Palm Beach Post said the episode "was funny from start to finish", particularly praising Dwight Schrute's role and the Michael Scott roast. However, Ingebritson said he was disgusted by the Leachman nude scene from Mrs. Albert Hannaday. Will Leitch of New York magazine, said the episode was funny, but "curiously unfocused [like] two half-hour episodes awkwardly spliced together. He praised the Black/Leachman film, the trouble Dwight kept getting in, and the Jim and Pam subplot, which he called "a rare Pam-Jim plot point that worked". However, he called the Michael roast "yet another Michael-wanting-to-be-loved-and-still-be-the-Boss subplot that takes over the second half".

Not all reviews were positive. Entertainment Weekly writer Whitney Pastorek said the episode started strong with the fire scare scene, but "tapered off into a disjointed plot" that she felt would not win new viewers. She said many jokes went too long and lost momentum, but nevertheless wrote "a lot of the episode’s humor was engaging and smart". Lorenzo Perez of The News & Observer said the Pam subplot was "overworked" and lacked impact, and the Dwight character was over-the-top, proving The Office writers clearly have no idea how to rein him in. Perez also expressed doubt the show would attract a new audience because it ran too late into the night following the Super Bowl. However, Perez said he enjoyed the Black/Leachman cameos. Terry Morrow of the Knoxville News Sentinel said, "This particular visit to The Office doesn't pop like most episodes". Morrow praised the Black/Leachman film, but said, "To be upstaged by a B-plot, one not involving the show's main characters at all, is a bit of a misdirection the show doesn't need in a post-Super Bowl time slot." USA Today critic Robert Bianco said the plot was extremely thin and the Black and Leachman cameos were humorless and grotesque. Bianco wrote, "Unfortunately, in an hour you get at most a handful of funny moments. So if you want funny from a comedy, look elsewhere."

== Awards ==
Jeffrey Blitz won the Primetime Emmy Award for Outstanding Directing for a Comedy Series for "Stress Relief". Dean Holland and David Rogers were also nominated for Outstanding Single-Camera Picture Editing for a Comedy Series. "Stress Relief" accounted for two of the ten Primetime Emmy Award nominations The Office received for the show's fifth season.
