= Goodbye, Toby =

- The Office episodes
- Episode nos.: Season 4 Episodes 18/19
- Directed by: Paul Feig
- Written by: Paul Lieberstein; Jennifer Celotta
- Cinematography by: Randall Einhorn
- Editing by: Dean Holland; David Rogers
- Production code: 418/419
- Original air date: May 15, 2008
- Running time: 42 minutes

Guest appearances
- Hugh Dane as Hank Tate; Bobby Ray Shafer as Bob Vance; Amy Ryan as Holly Flax

Episode chronology
← Previous "Job Fair"	Next → "Weight Loss"
- The Office (American season 4)

"Goodbye, Toby" is the hour-long finale of the fourth season of the American comedy television series The Office and the show's seventy-first and seventy-second episodes overall. Written by Paul Lieberstein and Jennifer Celotta, and directed by Paul Feig, the episode first aired in the United States on May 15, 2008, on NBC.

In this episode, Toby Flenderson (Lieberstein) spends his last day before moving to Costa Rica at Dunder Mifflin, and Phyllis Vance (Phyllis Smith) takes over preparations for his farewell party. Michael Scott (Steve Carell) develops feelings for the new Human Resources Representative Holly Flax (Amy Ryan). Jim Halpert (John Krasinski) plans to propose to Pam Beesly (Jenna Fischer), and Andy Bernard (Ed Helms) makes a proposal of his own.

"Goodbye, Toby" introduced the character Holly Flax, whose presence drastically affected the office in the series' fifth and seventh seasons. The episode received largely positive reviews from critics, with many applauding the introduction of Holly Flax, as well as the ending between Jim and Pam. The episode received a 4.1 Nielsen rating and was watched by 8.07 million viewers.

== Plot ==
Dunder Mifflin's Scranton branch is planning a going-away party for Toby Flenderson before he leaves for Costa Rica. Michael Scott is extremely happy that Toby is leaving, but when Angela Martin balks at his unreasonable party demands, Phyllis Vance accepts the duty of planning the party. She does fantastically, ordering carnival rides and hiring a band.

Michael's hatred of Toby is transferred to the new human resources representative, Holly Flax, and he and Dwight Schrute plan to haze her. When she playfully affects disdain for Toby, Michael takes her seriously, and falls in love with her. Taking advice from Jim Halpert, Michael warms Holly up with small talk and jokes, and even tempers Toby's exit interview, which he had originally planned to be brutally insulting, because Holly attends. During the interview, Pam helps Toby finally get revenge against Michael by making him give up his favorite watch to Toby after discovering he planned on giving him a rock for a going away gift. Dwight, however, continues the hazing, telling Holly that Kevin Malone is mentally challenged. After Michael catches Dwight releasing a raccoon into Holly's car, he loudly proclaims his high esteem for Holly. Holly gives special attention to Kevin due to her belief that he is mentally challenged, but Kevin believes her attention is a sexual interest in him.

Pam Beesly is accepted into Pratt Institute in New York City, where she will spend the summer studying graphic design. Jim calls Ryan Howard about a huge sale that he has recently made. Ryan instructs him to enter the sale on the company's website before abruptly hanging up. Jim takes this as another sign that Ryan is trying to push him out of the company, and leaves Ryan a voicemail proclaiming that he will fight Ryan's efforts. Creed Bratton and Jim find a video on YouTube of Ryan being arrested for fraud. Ryan's website was floundering, so he double-counted office sales as website sales, inflating the firm's figures. Although Michael is deeply concerned for Ryan, Jim is pleased and leaves Ryan a second voicemail mockingly telling Ryan to disregard the last because he had his "hands tied".

Michael discovers that Jan Levinson has artificially inseminated herself from a sperm bank. She explains that she did this while she was dating Michael, but still wants him to be involved in the pregnancy. He is indecisive, but eventually calls and agrees to attend Lamaze class with her.

Jim contributes several hundred dollars to the party-planning fund in order to buy fireworks, since he has decided to propose to Pam, going back to their "first date". Pam notices the purchase and guesses his intentions; however, at the party, Andy Bernard ruins the moment by proposing to Angela, who grudgingly accepts. Pam is disappointed that Jim did not propose to her. Michael has security escort Toby out of the office as a parting insult. Dwight is crushed that his ex-girlfriend is marrying someone else. Phyllis returns to the office, pleased at the success of her party, and walks in on Angela and Dwight having sex on Angela's desk.

== Production ==
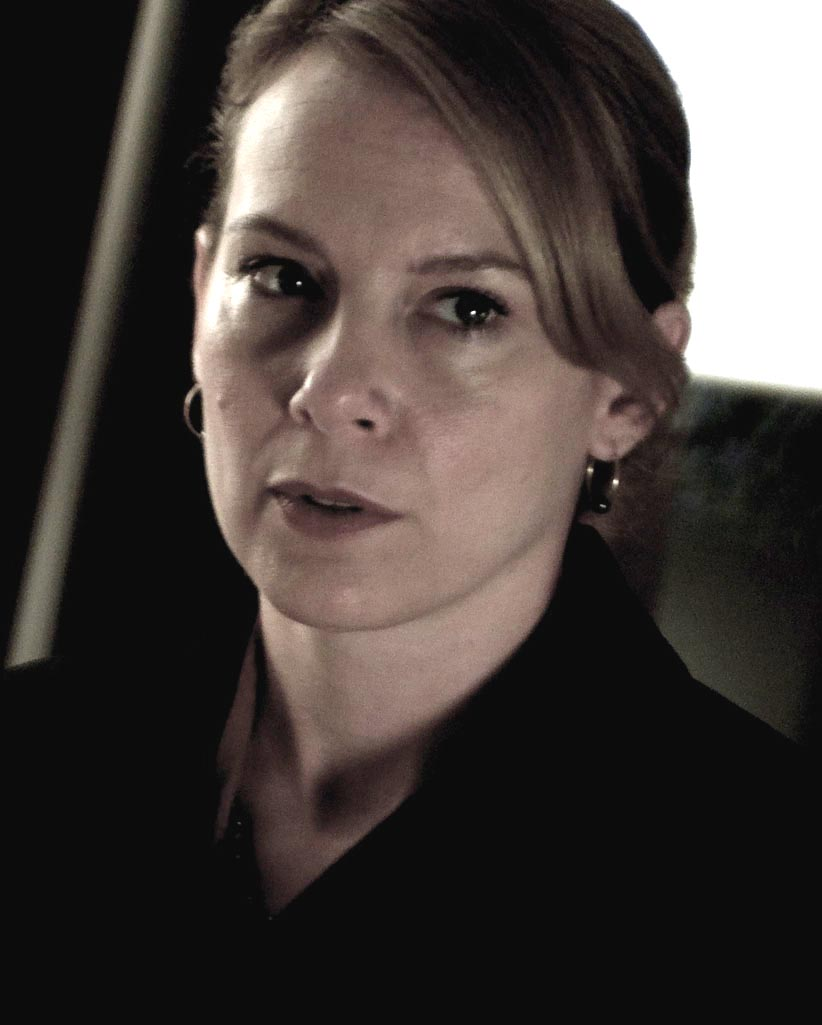
The episode introduced the character of Holly Flax, played by Amy Ryan.

"Goodbye, Toby" was written by Paul Lieberstein and Jennifer Celotta. Lieberstein is also the actor who plays Toby Flenderson. It took Lieberstein and Celotta four or five days to write this episode. Writer Anthony Farrell said that the idea for Dunder Mifflin Infinity to fail was inspired by the days that he was an administrative assistant for Countrywide Home Loans. Farrell recalled watching the company try new online initiatives and seeing them all be unsuccessful. "Goodbye, Toby" was the seventh episode of the series directed by Paul Feig. Feig had previously directed "Office Olympics", "Halloween", "Performance Review", "Email Surveillance", "Survivor Man" and "Dinner Party". Feig was tasked with shooting many of the shots that would hide Angela Kinsey's pregnant stomach. To do this, he "looked for places around the office that could conceal her belly".

The talking head interview wherein Michael compares Holly to a baker came after what the writers call "blitzes", in which all the writers write a talking head on a specific topic (such as "Michael's feelings to Holly"), read all of them out loud, and see which one gets the biggest reaction. The YouTube video of Ryan being arrested was set on a private account. After "Goodbye, Toby" aired, the video was released to the public. When writing the story for the episode, the show originally planned on having Dwight put a badger in Holly's car, but after finding out that it was difficult to get a badger, it was switched to a raccoon. The script also called for the raccoon to attack Meredith, but that was decided against for safety reasons. During one of the takes wherein Michael is singing his parody songs, Carell grabbed a guitar and played an Eddie Van Halen guitar solo, but that scene was cut because it did not match Michael's character. After filming, the editors had about 72 minutes of material that they needed to cut down into 40 minutes. The script also included an un-filmed scene in which Jan reveals to Michael that her sperm donor was Andy Roddick.

"Goodbye, Toby" introduced Holly Flax, played by Amy Ryan, who would go on to become Michael's main love interest. In fact, her return to the series in the seventh season was used by the writers as a way to write Steve Carell out of the series after his contract ended. Ryan gained prominence with her role as Beadie Russell on the HBO series The Wire. The writers of The Office, who were fans of the series, then approached Ryan about appearing in their show. Ryan, feeling that a comedy series would "keep [her] a couple steps ahead of people [and] surprise people" agreed. Holly's character was developed by the writers awhile before the episode was scripted. However, once Ryan began acting on set, Lieberstein explained that "we started to see this really silly side that Amy brought to the character, and [we] found almost like a junior Michael in her. And we all saw it and knew what we had." After the filming of "Goodbye, Toby", the writers were hoping that Ryan would return for the fifth season; the crew had not made a deal with her to film more episodes, but Lieberstein noted that "we knew that she would stay around, or we hoped." The episode also guest starred Melora Hardin, and Robert R. Shafer. The members of Darryl's band are the actual members of actor Craig Robinson's band: Chris Rob played bass, Asa Watkins played drums, and David Sampson played guitar.

The Season Four DVD contains a number of deleted scenes from this episode. Notable cut scenes include Michael comparing Toby to the flu, Holly asking Pam if Kevin just ate before jumping in the bounce castle, Jim and Pam browsing for apartments online, several scenes built around the subplot that being party planner is causing Phyllis to become like Angela, Michael and Holly talking about Holly's previous job, the staff reacting to a website outage, and Troy (Noel Potek) filling in for Ryan as director of sales. In one deleted scene, in which Toby gives a "farewell" speech that is interrupted by Michael, Toby pleads with the Dunder Mifflin staff to continue his fight to have the office checked for Radon; this scene foreshadows the Season 6 episode "The Chump", in which Toby sets numerous Radon test kits around the office.

== Cultural references ==
Michael offers to make Holly a mixtape. Michael and Holly trade comments, speaking as if they were Yoda. Michael and Holly shout "Acting!"—the catchphrase from the Jon Lovitz' "Master Thespian" skit from Saturday Night Live. Michael sings a parody of "Goodbye Stranger" by Supertramp entitled "Goodbye, Toby". He also mentions two other parodies that he wrote, "Beers in Heaven" and "Total Eclipse of the Fart", which are presumably parodies of "Tears in Heaven" by Eric Clapton and "Total Eclipse of the Heart" by Bonnie Tyler. The band performs "Just My Imagination" by The Temptations right before Andy proposes to Angela.

== Reception ==
"Goodbye, Toby" first aired on May 15, 2008, on NBC. The episode received 4.1/10 in the 18–49 demographic in the Nielsen ratings. This means that 4.1 percent of all households with an 18- to 49-year-old living in it watched the episode, and ten percent had their televisions tuned to the channel at any point. The episode was watched by 8.07 million viewers.

"Goodbye, Toby" was generally well received by critics. TV Squad's Jay Black said that "The Office is at its best when it's exposing the dramas that take place at every workplace". Black went on to say that Angela's rudeness to Phyllis "was a small thread throughout the show, but a hilarious one". Kelly West of Cinemablend.com wrote that even though the episode did not play-out "the way [she] expected", she was "definitely not complaining". Alan Sepinwall, a writer for The Star-Ledger, was critical of the proposal scenario, saying that "I really, really, really hope the writers aren't going to be foolish enough to try to create real strife in the PB&J (Pam Beesly and Jim) relationship over how long it's going to take Jim to propose." Furthermore, Sepinwall felt that "Goodbye, Toby" might have been, up until that point in the series, the show's "best hour-long 'Office' ever".

Nathan Rabin of The A.V. Club noted that "Goodbye, Toby" felt like "the season finaleiest of all season finales", largely because the series "cramm[ed] three or four episodes worth of revelations and big plot twists and turns into one jam-packed, over-stuffed, incidentriffic mega-super-double-extended episode." Rabin was pleased with Ryan's performance, noting that it proved she could play more than an "unfit, coke-crazed, borderline feral Boston shit-kickers", a reference to her Academy Award nominated performance in Gone Baby Gone. Furthermore, he was also complimentary towards the Jim and Pam plot. However, he felt that the episode's "overstuffed" qualities were a weakness, and he ultimately awarded it a "B+". The episode was nominated for an Emmy at the Primetime Emmys in the "Best Direction for a Comedy Series" category in 2008.
