= Holly Flax =

Fictional character from the American television series The Office

Holly Flax-Scott
- The Office character
- First appearance: "Goodbye, Toby" (2008)
- Last appearance: "Goodbye, Michael" (2011)
- Created by: Greg Daniels; Paul Lieberstein; Jennifer Celotta
- Portrayed by: Amy Ryan

In-universe information
- Occupation: HR Representative, Dunder Mifflin, Scranton; HR Representative, Dunder Mifflin, Nashua
- Spouse: Michael Scott
- Children: 4 (with Michael Scott)
- Home: Des Moines, Iowa / Boulder, Colorado
- Nationality: American

Hollis Partridge "Holly" Scott (née Flax) is a fictional character from the American television series The Office, played by Amy Ryan. She is an original character, and not based on any character from the British version of the show.

Initially introduced in season 4, Holly served as a replacement HR Representative for the Scranton branch of Dunder Mifflin, and quickly developed a romantic relationship with Michael Scott, the regional manager. After facing numerous challenges in their relationship, Holly and Michael ultimately get engaged and move to Colorado towards the end of season 7.

== Character history ==
=== Season 4 ===
Holly arrives at Dunder Mifflin to serve as the replacement for Toby Flenderson, the previous HR Representative for the Scranton branch. Michael initially dislikes Holly because she is part of Human Resources, but quickly falls in love with her after she playfully makes a joke about Toby's dullness. Holly is subjected to hazing by co-worker Dwight Schrute, who convinces her that Kevin Malone is mentally challenged, a belief she continues to harbor until season 5. When Dwight attempts to put a raccoon in Holly's convertible, Michael berates Dwight and loudly proclaims that Holly is the "best thing that has happened to this company since World War II." Holly invites Michael to go out for dessert following Toby's going-away party, but Michael turns down her offer to go with his ex-girlfriend Jan Levinson, who is pregnant and had asked Michael to be there as if he were the child's father.

=== Season 5 ===
Holly and Michael's relationship continues to grow throughout the first half of the season. After attending a new yoga class, Holly agrees to go on a date with the attractive yoga instructor, much to Michael's dismay. Holly buys tickets for Counting Crows, but the yoga instructor doesn't call her. Michael, who does not pick up on several hints that Holly has given him about attending the concert with her, purchases the tickets from her and rips them to pieces. She ultimately considers him to be her best friend in the office. It is also revealed that she was picked on as a child just like Michael.

In "Baby Shower", Michael and the staff attend Jan's baby shower; Michael tries to pacify Jan by purposely being cold towards Holly, which makes her uncomfortable. However, despite witnessing Michael's treatment of Holly throughout the day, Jan notices the two of them have a lot in common, and orders Michael not to date Holly. This, in addition to feeling no connection with Jan's baby, prompts Michael to apologetically hug Holly and ask her out on a date, which she accepts, visibly moved.

Holly and Michael begin a romantic relationship, eventually having sex in the office on their third date. While organizing a fundraiser, CFO David Wallace notices Michael and Holly kissing, and realizes they are in a relationship. In response, Holly is transferred back to Nashua. She and Michael plan to continue dating, but ultimately decide to break up, realizing on the trip that the distance is insurmountable. Later, Michael calls David and scolds him for transferring Holly from the Scranton branch.

In "Lecture Circuit", Michael goes to Nashua with Pam Beesly to give a lecture about the Scranton branch; he plans to find closure with Holly, but she is away on an HR retreat. It is also revealed that she is dating A.J., one of her co-workers. This deeply upsets Michael and makes him unable to do his presentation. Sneaking into Holly's office, Michael discovers a file on her computer titled "Dear Michael" and copies it to his flash drive. Pam volunteers to read the document herself and deletes it afterward, telling Michael it said she still has feelings for him.

In "Company Picnic", Holly and Michael reunite at the company picnic for the first time since she was transferred. She is still seeing A.J., who arrives with her. David Wallace lets Holly and Michael do a skit about the history of Dunder Mifflin; the two decide to do a skit that spoofs Slumdog Millionaire. Michael and Holly reminisce about the presentation and talk about one in the future. Holly leaves with A.J., with Michael noting that it wasn't the right time to talk to her, but that they will eventually find each other.

=== Season 7 ===
Holly in Season 7

In "Classy Christmas", Holly returns to Scranton to fill in while Toby is away at jury duty. The initial excitement about seeing her old friend again turns to anger, when Michael, jealous that she is still with A.J., vandalizes A.J.'s gift to her - a Woody doll. Holly divulges to the women of the office that A.J. won't commit, and reveals she's giving him an ultimatum to propose to her by New Year's. Michael is cheered up by the news, as well as Holly lying to A.J. about how the Woody doll got damaged. Following the holiday break, Holly and A.J. break up, and her and Michael's friendship starts to rebuild itself. Holly initially rejects Michael's advances, stating she doesn't want to be involved with a co-worker again. However, they eventually admit that they miss each other and share a kiss. Michael and Holly start dating, and in the episode "PDA", they decide to move in together.

As the season progresses, Holly's presence leads Michael to become a more mature adult. When Todd Packer returns to the sales bullpen, Holly initially trusts Michael's assessment of Packer, but confronts Michael after Packer shows his true colors. When Michael tries to smooth things over, Packer speaks disrespectfully about Holly; Michael decides not to disclose that Packer's "promotion" in Florida is a prank by Jim and Dwight, and as Michael and Holly watch him drive away, Michael admits that Packer is "an ass."

In "Garage Sale", she discovers that her aging parents need assistance and decides to move home to Colorado. She briefly changes her mind when Michael seems reluctant, stating that he is her life now. At the end of the episode, Michael leads her through various spots in the building that are meaningful to them. Finally leading her to the annex, Michael mentions that it was where he first fell in love with her, and proposes to her in front of the staff. She accepts the proposal, and afterwards, Michael announces to the office that he's quitting his job to move to Colorado with Holly.

=== Season 9 ===
Though Holly does not make an appearance in the final season, Pam reveals that Michael and Holly are living very happily together with their children.

== Behind the scenes ==
In a 2021 interview on the Office Ladies podcast, Ryan revealed that she was a fan of the show, and expressed interest to her agent about playing a role. Writer Paul Lieberstein, who had worked with Ryan before on The Naked Truth, approached Ryan about appearing on the show as Holly, a role which was initially for one episode only. During the filming of "Goodbye, Toby", Lieberstein commented that "we started to see this really silly side that Amy brought to the character, and [we] found almost like a junior Michael in her. And we all saw it and knew what we had." Impressed by Ryan's performance, the writers hoped that Ryan would return for the fifth season, as the crew had not made a deal with her to film more episodes.

== Reception ==
Ryan's portrayal of Holly has received positive reviews from critics. In an Entertainment Weekly article about Holly's character, writer Darren Franich praised the addition of Holly in season 5, writing, "Amy Ryan managed to achieve the impossible: She made Holly seem like someone who could believably fall in love with Michael Scott." In a review of "Classy Christmas" by The A.V. Club, critic Myles McNutt wrote, "Holly is legitimately perfect for Michael. She's just crazy enough to play along with Michael's antics and just sane enough to know when he's crossed a line". Alan Sepinwall of Uproxx applauded Holly's return in season 7, calling her a "welcome return."
