= Asaad Kelada =

Egyptian-born American television director

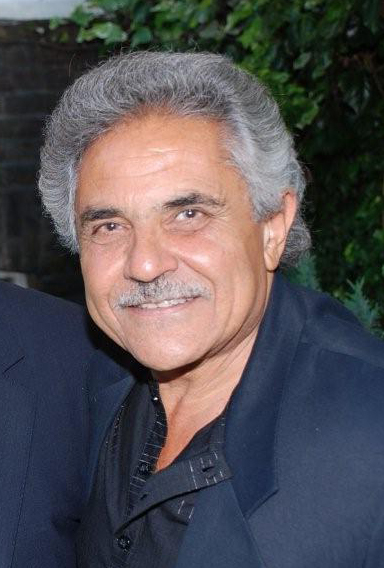
- Born: May 11, 1940 (age 86); Cairo, Egypt
- Education: American University in Cairo (BA); Yale University (MFA)
- Occupation: Television director/producer
- Years active: 1964–present

Asaad Kelada (Arabic: أسعد قلادة; born May 11, 1940) is an Egyptian-American television director of many American television sitcoms.

== Early life ==
Kelada was born in Cairo, Egypt and he studied drama under Youssef Chahine at the American University in Cairo. In 1961, he emigrated to the United States and studied directing at the Yale School of Drama.

== Career ==
After directing stage plays and teaching drama in the 1960s and 1970s, he landed his first opportunity to direct for television in 1976, with an episode of the sitcom Rhoda, "Rhoda Questions Her Life and Flies to Paris". Since that time, he has directed episodes of several well-known sitcoms including Benson, WKRP in Cincinnati, The Facts of Life, Family Ties, and Who's the Boss?, where he directed 117 episodes and was also listed as producer on 51 episodes.

Kelada spoke with DGA Magazine and said that good casting is essential to the success of a comedy, because "you cannot make the actor be funny". He said that where drama is "analytical," comedy is "much more technical. It's about rhythm, timing, pace, and energy."

== Filmography ==
Year	TV series	Notes
1976	Phyllis	Directed 2 episodes
1976–1978	Rhoda	Directed 7 episodes
1977	Busting Loose	Directed 1 episode
1977	We've Got Each Other	Directed 1 episode
1977–1978	The Tony Randall Show	Directed 5 episodes
1978	Baby, I'm Back	Directed 1 episode
1978–1982	WKRP in Cincinnati	Directed 15 episodes
1979–1980	The Last Resort	Directed 15 episodes
1980	Benson	Directed 2 episodes
1980–1985	The Facts of Life	Directed 77 episodes
1981	One Day at a Time	Directed 1 episode
1981	The Two of Us	Directed 4 episodes
1981	Park Place	Directed 1 episode
1982	Report to Murphy	Directed 1 episode
1982	The Facts of Life Goes to Paris	Director, Television movie
1982–1988	Family Ties	Directed 8 episodes
1984	Night Court	Directed 2 episodes
1984–1990	Who's the Boss?	Directed 117 episodes, producer, 51 episodes
1985	No Complaints!	Directed 1 episode, executive producer
1986	Valerie	Directed 5 episodes
1986	Charmed Lives	Directed 1 episode
1987	Karen's Song	Directed 3 episodes
1988	Frank's Place	Directed 1 episode
1988–1989	Day by Day	Directed 2 episodes
1989	The Ed Begley Jr. Show	Directed 1 episode
1990	Married People	Directed 12 episodes
1991	Designing Women	Directed 1 episode
1991	The New WKRP in Cincinnati	Directed 10 episode
1992	Frannie's Turn	Directed 4 episodes
1993–1994	George	Directed 9 episodes
1995–1996	In the House	Directed 12 episodes
1996	The Louie Show	Directed 3 episodes
1996–1997	Sister, Sister	Directed 16 episodes
1999–2002	Dharma & Greg	Directed 14 episodes
2000	The Michael Richards Show	Directed 4 episodes
2000–2001	Everybody Loves Raymond	Directed 2 episodes
2003	Sabrina the Teenage Witch	Directed 2 episodes
2004	Good Morning, Miami	Directed 1 episode
2004	Still Standing	Directed 1 episode
2005	Two and a Half Men	Directed 2 episodes
2006	Courting Alex	Directed 3 episodes
2008	Happy Hour	Directed 1 episode
2009	The Office	Directed 1 episode
2009	Ruby & The Rockits	Directed 2 episodes
2016	My America	Directed 2 episodes (TV series short)

== See also ==
- List of Copts
- Lists of Egyptians
