= Aaron Shure =

American television writer, director, and producer

- Occupations: Writer, director, producer
- Years active: 1997–present
- Known for: Comedy series
- Notable credits: Writer, George and Leo; Writer and Executive Producer, Everybody Loves Raymond; Writer and producer, Lucky Louie; Writer and producer, The New Adventures of Old Christine; Writer and producer, The Office; Writer and producer, Hot in Cleveland; Director, Dirty Work; Writer and producer, People of Earth
- Awards: Primetime Emmy Award (3)

Aaron Shure is an American television writer, director, and producer. He is known for his work on several comedy series, including The Office, Everybody Loves Raymond, Lucky Louie, George and Leo, and The New Adventures of Old Christine.

Shure was showrunner and executive producer for season 3 of the TBS comedy People of Earth, but that season was cancelled prior to production.

== Career ==
=== Television ===
Born in Colorado, Shure regularly performed as an underage regular at Comedy Works in Denver. He graduated from Colorado College with a degree in philosophy and later worked as a karaoke host, street performer, radio commentator and circus clown. After moving to Florida, Shure performed on the streets as a member of Streetmosphere, a character-based improv troupe at Disney-MGM Studios. He also developed skills in improvisational comedy at SAK Comedy Lab.

Shure began his career as a writer for the CBS series George and Leo, and then as a writer and executive producer for the classic CBS sitcom Everybody Loves Raymond for the next seven years. In that time, Shure received two Emmy Awards for Outstanding Comedy Series and five Emmy nominations. The show was named 30-Minute TV Program of the Year by the American Film Institute and recognized, along with The Office, as one of the 101 best written television series of all time by the Writers Guild of America, West.

He then moved on to writing and producing for Louis C.K.'s HBO series Lucky Louie, followed by The New Adventures of Old Christine. From 2008 to 2012, Shure was a writer and producer for the hit NBC sitcom The Office, where he earned three consecutive Emmy nominations and three consecutive WGA nominations for TV Comedy Series, plus an additional WGA TV Episodic Comedy nomination for his episode "WUPHF.com." He worked on 99 episodes of the series, but not all his ideas made it into the show: an episode about Michael Scott coming back to the office in a messianic mood after spending the night accidentally crucified to a garage door was never filmed, even though Shure pitched it repeatedly.

Following The Office, Shure wrote and produced for TV Land's Hot in Cleveland. He also created and directed the transmedia series Dirty Work, which won the Emmy Award for Outstanding Creative Achievement in Interactive Media, the first time ever the Television Academy had awarded a property created solely for an online audience.

Since 2016, he has written and produced for the TBS comedy series, People of Earth, whose executive producers also include Conan O'Brien and Greg Daniels.

Shure and Norman Lear co-wrote en episode of "Notes on Love" for Shondaland and Netflix.

=== Commentary ===
Shure's radio commentary has aired on WBEZ and NPR and he once appeared on the Late Show with David Letterman during a "Stupid Human Tricks" segment. He has written political commentaries for The Huffington Post and mused about the trials of being an expectant father for Salon.

== Personal life ==
He lives in Los Angeles with his two children and actively supports Public Citizen, a non-partisan foundation which says it serves as the people's voice in the nation's capital.

== Filmography ==
=== As producer ===
Year	Title	Role
2017	People of Earth	Executive Producer
2017	People of Earth	Showrunner
2011–2012	The Office	Consulting Producer
2008–2011	The Office	Co-Executive Producer
2008	The New Adventures of Old Christine	Consulting Producer
2006–2007	Lucky Louie	Consulting Producer
2002–2005	Everybody Loves Raymond	Co-Executive Producer
2001–2002	Everybody Loves Raymond	Supervising Producer
2000–2001	Everybody Loves Raymond	Producer
2005	Everybody Loves Raymond: The Last Laugh	Executive Producer

=== As writer ===
Year	Title	Role
2017	People of Earth: 1. "Gerry's Return" (August 7, 2017) – Season 2	Writer and Executive Producer
2012	Dirty Work	Writer and co-Creator
2008–2012	The Office: 1. "Baby Shower" (October 16, 2008) – Season 5; 2. "Two Weeks" (March 26, 2009) – Season 5; 3. "The Meeting" (September 24, 2009) – Season 6; 4. "The Chump" (May 13, 2010) – Season 6; 5. "WUPHF.com" (November 18, 2010) – Season 7; 6. "Jury Duty" (February 2, 2012) – Season 8	Writer
2008	The New Adventures of Old Christine	Writer
2006	Lucky Louie	Writer
1999–2005	Everybody Loves Raymond	Writer
1999–2000	Everybody Loves Raymond	Executive Story Editor
1998–1999	Everybody Loves Raymond	Story Editor
1997–1998	George and Leo	Teleplay

== Awards ==
=== Primetime Emmy Awards ===
Year	Category	Film	Result
2011–2012	Outstanding Creative Achievement in Interactive Media: Original Interactive Television Programming	Dirty Work	Won
2010–2011	Outstanding Comedy Series	The Office	Nominated
2009–2010	Outstanding Comedy Series	The Office	Nominated
2008–2009	Outstanding Comedy Series	The Office	Nominated
2004–2005	Outstanding Comedy Series	Everybody Loves Raymond	Won
2004–2005	Outstanding Variety, Music, or Comedy Special	Everybody Loves Raymond: The Last Laugh	Nominated
2004–2005	Outstanding Writing for a Comedy Series	Everybody Loves Raymond – "The Finale"	Nominated
2003–2004	Outstanding Comedy Series	Everybody Loves Raymond	Nominated
2002–2003	Outstanding Comedy Series	Everybody Loves Raymond	Won
2001–2002	Outstanding Comedy Series	Everybody Loves Raymond	Nominated
2000–2001	Outstanding Comedy Series	Everybody Loves Raymond	Nominated

=== Writers Guild of America Awards ===
Year	Category	TV	Result
2010	Television: Comedy Series	The Office	Nominated
2010	Television: Episodic Comedy	The Office – "WUPHF.com"	Nominated
2009	Television: Comedy Series	The Office	Nominated
2008	Television: Comedy Series	The Office	Nominated
