= The Carpet (The Office) =

- The Office episode
- Episode no.: Season 2 Episode 14
- Directed by: Victor Nelli, Jr.
- Written by: Paul Lieberstein
- Cinematography by: Randall Einhorn
- Editing by: David Rogers
- Production code: 2012
- Original air date: January 26, 2006
- Running time: 22 minutes

Guest appearances
- Ken Howard as Ed Truck; David Koechner as Todd Packer (voice); Craig Robinson as Darryl Philbin

Episode chronology
| ← Previous "The Secret" | Next → "Boys and Girls" |
- The Office (American TV series) season 2

"The Carpet" is the fourteenth episode of the second season of the American comedy television series The Office and the show's twentieth episode overall. It was written by Paul Lieberstein and directed by Victor Nelli, Jr. The episode first aired on January 26, 2006 on NBC. The episode guest stars Ken Howard as Ed Truck, and David Koechner as Todd Packer.

The series depicts the everyday lives of office employees in the Scranton, Pennsylvania branch of the fictional Dunder Mifflin Paper Company. In this episode, a disgusting "thing" – implied to be human feces – is left in Michael Scott's (Steve Carell) office, and Michael tries to discover who did it. While his carpet is being replaced, he uses Jim Halpert's (John Krasinski) desk, forcing Jim to move away from Pam Beesly (Jenna Fischer) into the annex.

"The Carpet" is the first and only episode to feature Howard as Truck. However, the death of the character would serve as the main plot for the third season episode "Grief Counseling". The episode received largely positive reviews from television critics. Upon its original broadcast, "The Carpet" earned a Nielsen rating of 4.6 in the 18–49 demographic, being viewed by 8.6 million viewers. At the time of its release, it was the second most-downloaded episode of a television show on the iTunes store.

== Synopsis ==
When someone leaves a disgusting substance on the carpet in Michael Scott's office, he spends the day at Jim Halpert's desk, relegating Jim to the back room (referred to as the "Annex") to suffer Kelly Kapoor's constant chattering. She asks Jim to hook her up with Ryan Howard. Jim questions Ryan, who says he is interested in Kelly, but only for a non-committal relationship. Kelly wants a committed relationship, but directs Jim to tell Ryan the opposite. Jim continues to yearn for Pam Beesly, but her groom-to-be, Roy Anderson, is in the office replacing the carpet along with Darryl Philbin, and Jim is unable to speak with her.

Michael becomes increasingly incensed at what happened to his office. Believing it to have been perpetrated by someone in the office, he begins to lose his faith in his employees. Michael tries talking to his former boss Ed Truck, who tells him that he does not need to have his employees be his friends. But Michael's mood changes drastically when he finds out the prank was carried out by his obnoxious friend Todd Packer. Michael instantly finds the joke hilarious, and his faith in his friends is restored. At the end of the day, Jim is cheered up when he finds that all seven of his voicemail messages were left by Pam throughout the day.

== Production ==
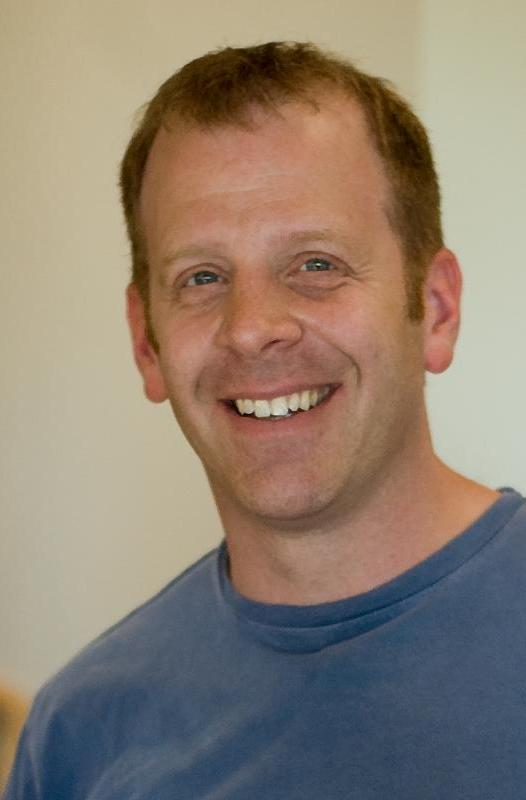
The Office actor and executive producer Paul Lieberstein wrote "The Carpet".

"The Carpet" was written by Paul Lieberstein, who portrays Toby Flenderson on the series, making it his third writing credit after the first season entry "Health Care" and the second-season episode "The Client". The episode was directed by Victor Nelli, Jr. The episode is the first and only to feature Howard as Ed Truck. However, the death of the character would serve as the main plot for the third season episode "Grief Counseling". Actress Kate Flannery later revealed that, for the old 1980s picture of Michael and Ed, Carell had to wear a mullet wig.

Before the episode aired, the cast and crew received news that the show would be renewed for a third season. Jenna Fischer (Pam) noted that "It is rare in this business to hear news of a pickup so early", but that NBC was very pleased with how well the show was doing. It had previously, and erroneously, been advertised that the show would finish its run at the end of March 2006. Fischer explained that while the season would end – actually in May – the show would continue.

The exact nature of the substance that is deposited on Michael's carpet is never made clear. Fischer only described it as "soft [...] smelly [and] brown". In fact, the circumstance in which the substance is viewed by the camera is still ambiguous; Television Without Pity reviewer M. Giant noted that the viewer only gets "the merest out-of-focus Blair Witch glimpse" of the substance. Fischer also noted that one of the more interesting aspects of the episode was the "you [the audience] finally see Pam and Roy getting along". She explained that this was because Roy and Pam returned from "a romantic vacation in the Poconos".

Deleted scenes include: Dwight Schrute (Rainn Wilson) believing that a higher power brought Michael to his desk, Angela Martin (Angela Kinsey) and Kevin Malone (Brian Baumgartner) speculating on the culprit, Jim unable to handle Kelly's chattering, Jim eating lunch by himself in his car, Michael being unable to complete a sale, Michael stealing a crumpet from Dwight, Dwight and Angela having a secret conversation in the kitchen, and Jim asking Toby Flenderson (Lieberstein) how he handled Kelly's loquaciousness.

== Cultural references ==
Michael compares that the circumstances of the episode to the components for an audition tape for Fear Factor, an American sports dare reality game show. Michael later bothers Stanley Hudson (Leslie David Baker) with an impression of the Popeye cartoon character J. Wellington Wimpy. Dwight makes repeated calls to WEZX Rock 107, a Scranton radio station that plays classic rock. Michael snidely compares Darryl and Roy's work to Extreme Makeover: Home Edition, an American reality television series providing home improvements for less fortunate families and community schools.

== Reception ==
=== Ratings ===
"The Carpet" originally aired on NBC on January 26, 2006. The episode received a 4.6 rating/11 percent share among adults between the ages of 18 and 49. This means that it was seen by 4.6 percent of all 18- to 49-year-olds, and 11 percent of all 18- to 49-year-olds watching television at the time of the broadcast. "The Carpet" was viewed by 8.6 million viewers. The episode retained 93 percent of its lead-in My Name Is Earl audience.

=== Critical reception ===
Critical reception to the episode was largely positive. M. Giant of Television Without Pity awarded the episode an "A−". Brendan Babish of DVD Verdict gave the episode a largely positive review and awarded it an "A−". He called it "another solid episode" and praised the "guest appearance by Ken Howard of The White Shadow fame". After the episode aired, several newspapers, including the Los Angeles Times and The Journal Gazette reported on the episode's success, as well as others in the season, in building the show's audience. Furthermore, the episode was particularly popular with fans of the series, especially college students. After the episode aired, it was made available on the iTunes online digital store, where, for a time, it was the second most-downloaded episode of a television show.
