= The Office (American TV series) season 2 =

Season of television series

The Office
- Season 2
- DVD cover
- Showrunner: Greg Daniels
- Starring: Steve Carell; Rainn Wilson; John Krasinski; Jenna Fischer; B. J. Novak; Melora Hardin; David Denman; Leslie David Baker; Brian Baumgartner; Kate Flannery; Angela Kinsey; Oscar Nunez; Phyllis Smith
- No. of episodes: 22

Release
- Original network: NBC
- Original release: September 20, 2005 – May 11, 2006

Season chronology
- ← Previous; Season 1 Next → Season 3

The second season of the American situation comedy television series, The Office, premiered in the United States on NBC on September 20, 2005, and ended on May 11, 2006. The season had 22 episodes, including its first 40-minute "super-sized" episode. The Office is an American adaptation of the British TV series, and is presented in a mockumentary format, documenting the daily lives of office employees in the Scranton, Pennsylvania, branch of the fictitious Dunder Mifflin Paper Company. The season stars Steve Carell, Rainn Wilson, John Krasinski, Jenna Fischer, and B. J. Novak, with supporting performances from Melora Hardin, David Denman, Leslie David Baker, Brian Baumgartner, Kate Flannery, Angela Kinsey, Oscar Nunez, and Phyllis Smith.

Beginning with "The Dundies", the second season further explored the threat of company downsizing. It also introduced new characters while developing those who had been less fleshed out the previous season—especially that of Dwight Schrute (Rainn Wilson). Michael Scott (Steve Carell) soon starts a relationship with his boss Jan Levinson (Melora Hardin), and Pam Beesly (Jenna Fischer) and Jim Halpert's (John Krasinski) relationship becomes one of the focal points of the season. Their compatibility becomes more obvious as Jim's feelings for Pam continue to grow, while she struggles with her relationship with warehouse worker Roy Anderson (David Denman).

Season two of The Office aired on Tuesdays in the United States at 9:30 p.m. from September 20, 2005, to December 6, 2005. The timeslot changed to Thursdays at 9:30 p.m. from January 5, 2006, to May 11, 2006. The season was a ratings success, bolstered by Carell's success in the 2005 film The 40-Year-Old Virgin. The season also received widespread acclaim from critics. The second season was released in a four-disc DVD boxset in Region 1 on September 12, 2006, and in Region 2 on January 28, 2008. The DVD set contained all 22 episodes, as well as commentaries from creators, writers, actors, and directors on some of the episodes, while also containing deleted scenes from all of the episodes. It was released by Universal Studios Home Entertainment.

== Production ==
The second season of The Office was produced by Reveille Productions and Deedle-Dee Productions, both in association with NBC Universal Television Studio. The show is based on the British series created by Ricky Gervais and Stephen Merchant (who also serve as executive producers of the American version). This season was produced by Greg Daniels, who also served as its showrunner. Returning writers included Daniels, Larry Wilmore, Michael Schur, Mindy Kaling, Paul Lieberstein, and B. J. Novak. New writers for the season included story editors Lee Eisenberg and Gene Stupnitsky, consulting producer Jennifer Celotta, and series star, Steve Carell, who wrote the season finale, "Casino Night".

In total, eight different individuals directed the season's 22 episodes. Four of those directors—Bryan Gordon, Ken Kwapis, Ken Whittingham, and Daniels—had directed episodes during the show's first season. For Dennie Gordon, Paul Feig, Victor Nelli, Jr., and Charles McDougall, season two marked their directorial debuts on the show. In contrast to the previous season, which had been shot in an actual office building, this season of The Office was mainly filmed on a studio set at Valley Center Studios in Van Nuys, California.

Despite low ratings from the first season of the show, NBC renewed The Office for a second season. Originally, six episodes were ordered, but NBC later ordered an additional seven. In early November, NBC again expanded the season by ordering three more episodes, before ordering a full season of 22 episodes in January 2006.

== Cast ==
The Office employed an ensemble cast. Most of the main characters, and some supporting ones, are based on characters from the British version of The Office. While these characters normally have the same attitudes and perceptions as their British counterparts, the roles have been redesigned to better fit the American show. The show featured a large cast size, many of whom were known for their improvisational work.

=== Main ===
- Steve Carell as Michael Scott, regional manager of the Dunder Mifflin Scranton Branch. Loosely based on David Brent, Gervais' character in the British version, Scott is a dim-witted and lonely man, who attempts to win friends as the office comedian, usually making himself look bad in the process.
- Rainn Wilson as Dwight Schrute, who, based upon Gareth Keenan, is the assistant to the regional manager, although the character frequently fails to include "to the" in his title.
- John Krasinski as Jim Halpert, a sales representative and prankster, who is based upon Tim Canterbury, and is in love with Pam Beesly, the receptionist.
- Jenna Fischer as Pam Beesly, who is based on Dawn Tinsley, is shy, but is often a cohort with Jim in his pranks on Dwight.
- B. J. Novak as Ryan Howard, who is a temporary worker.

=== Starring ===
Halfway through the season, eight of the show's recurring guest stars were promoted to series regulars and credited just after the main titles and before the writers and producers.

- Melora Hardin as Jan Levinson, Michael's main love interest and vice president of regional sales.
- David Denman as Roy Anderson, a warehouse worker and Pam's fiancé.
- Leslie David Baker as Stanley Hudson, a grumpy salesman.
- Brian Baumgartner as Kevin Malone, a dim-witted accountant.
- Kate Flannery as Meredith Palmer, the promiscuous supplier relations rep.
- Angela Kinsey as Angela Martin, a judgmental accountant, who also serves as Dwight’s love interest.
- Oscar Nunez as Oscar Martinez, an intelligent accountant, who is also gay.
- Phyllis Smith as Phyllis Lapin, a motherly saleswoman.

=== Recurring ===
- Mindy Kaling as Kelly Kapoor, the pop culture-obsessed customer service representative.
- Paul Lieberstein as Toby Flenderson, the sad-eyed human resources representative.
- Creed Bratton as Creed Bratton, the office's strange quality assurance officer.
- Craig Robinson as Darryl Philbin, the warehouse manager.
- Devon Abner as Devon White, a supplier relations representative.
- Hugh Dane as Hank Tate, the building's security guard.
- David Koechner as Todd Packer, a rude and offensive traveling salesman, who’s Michael’s best friend.
- Nancy Walls as Carol Stills, a real estate agent.
- Amy Adams as Katy Moore, a handbag saleswoman and Jim’s girlfriend.
- Bobby Ray Shafer as Bob Vance, Phyllis' boyfriend, who runs Vance Refrigeration.
- Andy Buckley as David Wallace, the new CFO of Dunder Mifflin.

== Broadcast and reception ==
=== Ratings ===
Ratings for each episode of The Office that aired this season.^{i}

The season premiere, "The Dundies" was viewed by 9.0 million viewers, a drastic increase from the first season finale "Hot Girl", which was viewed by only 4.8 million viewers. As the season progressed, the success of Carell's hit summer movie The 40-Year-Old Virgin and online sales of episodes via the iTunes store helped the show to garner viewers. The increase in viewership led NBC to move the series to the "Must See TV" Thursday night in January 2006, where ratings continued to grow. The season hit a ratings peak with the twelfth episode, "The Injury", which was viewed by 10.3 million viewers. The season finale, "Casino Night"—which was also the show's first forty-minute-long episode—was viewed by 7.6 million viewers.

By the end of the 2005–06 season, The Office tied with 20/20 as the 67th most-watched show of the year. It averaged eight million viewers, and scored a 4.0/10 in the Nielsen ratings, meaning that on average four percent of households were tuned in at any given moment and ten percent of all televisions in use at the time were tuned into the program. The show received dramatic gains in viewers from the previous year, up forty percent in total viewers and up sixty percent in viewers ages 18–49. A year-end report by NBC noted, "The Office was the fastest-growing series on television this season versus last ... The Office grew by 60 percent this season in adults 18–49 (to an average 4.0 rating from a 2.5 the prior season)."

=== Reviews ===
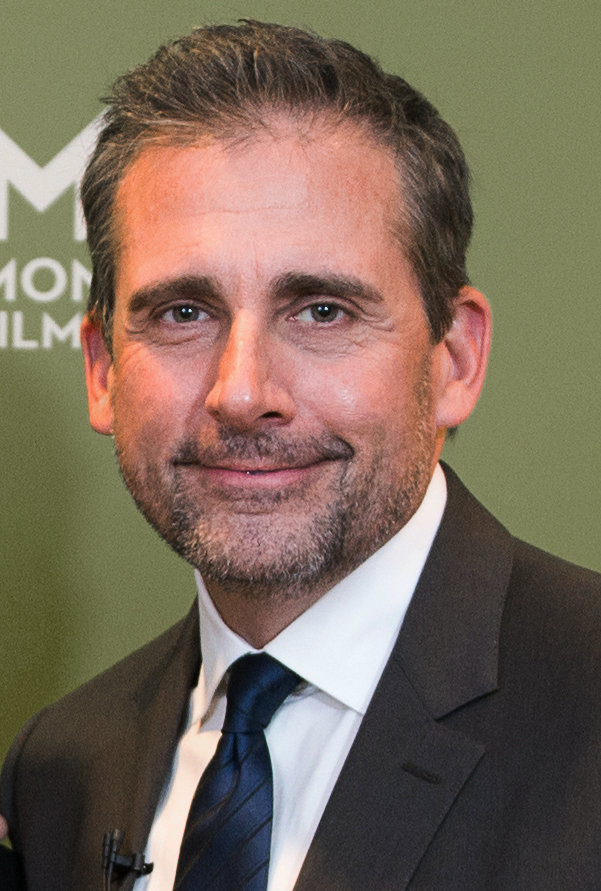
Steve Carell received awards for both acting and writing.

The second season of The Office was released largely to critical acclaim and commercial success. Francis Rizzo III of DVD Talk wrote that the British version "can't hold a candle to the American" version during this season, due to the show coming "into its own, becoming the best half-hour show on TV." Furthermore, Rizzo wrote that the season was filled with "fantastically real characters" as well as "one of the best-handled romances in TV history". Eric Goldman of IGN noted that season two transformed The Office "from a very funny show into a truly brilliant show". Goldman praised the world-building of the season, writing that it "does a wonderful job of developing the rest of the staff of Dunder-Mifflin [sic], something the UK version could never do to this extent". He ultimately gave it a ten out of ten score. Josh Wolk, an Entertainment Weekly television critic, said that the show has "perfecting workaday moments so hilariously and relatably awkward that it makes viewers both laugh and cringe".

The season was also a commercial success. Midway through the season, a deal was made with Apple to offer the show's episodes for download through its iTunes store. This action, in turn, led to many fans buying the series before the DVD set was released. For some time, "The Carpet", the season's fourteenth episode, was the second most-downloaded episode of a television show in the store, and by early January 2006, episodes from The Office occupied ten of the twenty slots in the iTunes list of most popular downloads. In 2006, after the release of the DVD, the second season was the seventeenth highest selling DVD on Amazon that year.

=== Accolades ===
The second season of The Office received five nominations at the 58th Primetime Emmy Awards, and won the award for Outstanding Comedy Series. Other nominations included Outstanding Lead Actor in a Comedy Series for Steve Carell, Outstanding Writing for a Comedy Series for Michael Schur (for the episode "Christmas Party"), and Outstanding Single-Camera Picture Editing for a Comedy Series for both "Christmas Party" (edited by David Rogers) and "Booze Cruise" (edited by Dean Holland). Carell also received the Television Critic's Award for Best Individual Achievement in Comedy, and the show received the Television Critic's Award for Outstanding Achievement in Comedy. For the episode "Michael's Birthday", Ken Whittingham won the award for Outstanding Director in Comedy Series at the NAACP Image Awards. At the 2007 Writers Guild of America Awards, The Office received the award for Best Comedy Series, and Carell won the award for Episodic Comedic Writing for the episode "Casino Night". The Office was also honored as a recipient of a Peabody Award in 2006, honoring the show for excellence in radio and/or television broadcasting.

== Episodes ==
No. overall	No. in season	Title	Directed by	Written by	Original release date	Prod. code	U.S. viewers (millions)
7	1	"The Dundies"	Greg Daniels	Mindy Kaling	September 20, 2005	2003	9.00
Michael Scott, regional manager of Dunder Mifflin, announces that it is time for the annual Dundie Awards that the employees loathe due to the insulting awards Michael bestows on them. At the awards, receptionist Pam Beesly tells off her fiancé Roy Anderson, one of the warehouse workers, when he insists they leave, and she later gets drunk. Michael becomes the bumbling emcee and bestows the regularly embarrassing awards on them.
8	2	"Sexual Harassment"	Ken Kwapis	B. J. Novak	September 27, 2005	2002	7.13
Corporate headquarters orders Human Resources representative Toby Flenderson to conduct a review at the Scranton branch of the company's sexual harassment policies. The company also sends a lawyer to Scranton. Michael fears that this will hinder his ability to keep an "easy-going office," but later realizes that the lawyer was sent to protect him.
9	3	"Office Olympics"	Paul Feig	Michael Schur	October 4, 2005	2004	8.27
Michael and salesman Dwight Schrute leave to close a deal on Michael's new condominium. Michael meets with his realtor Carol Stills, but becomes stressed when he realizes how long it will take to pay off his condo. Boredom leads receptionist Pam and salesman Jim Halpert to create the office olympics, in which their co-workers compete in various games using office supplies. Michael and Dwight's return stops the event, but Jim gives the gold medal to Michael for closing the purchase of his condo.
10	4	"The Fire"	Ken Kwapis	B. J. Novak	October 11, 2005	2001	7.62
A fire in the office leads the employees to evacuate the building. To pass the time, the employees play games and learn more about each other. Jim is revealed to be dating handbag saleswoman Katy Moore, something Pam seems bothered by. Meanwhile, Michael tries to mentor temporary worker Ryan Howard, but discovers that Ryan is more educated than he is. Dwight becomes jealous of the attention that Michael is giving Ryan. At the end of the day, it is determined that Ryan accidentally caused the fire, and Dwight is thrilled.
11	5	"Halloween"	Paul Feig	Greg Daniels	October 18, 2005	2006	8.02
Downsizing leads corporate headquarters to order Michael to fire somebody by the end of October. Michael procrastinates until Halloween, when he still has not decided whom to fire. When he decides to fire Quality Assurance representative Creed Bratton, Creed manages to convince Michael to fire Supplier Relations representative Devon White instead.
12	6	"The Fight"	Ken Kwapis	Gene Stupnitsky & Lee Eisenberg	November 1, 2005	2007	7.93
Michael and Dwight get in an argument about which of them could beat the other in a fight. They decide to settle this by having a showdown at a local dojo. After a comedic fight, Michael finally emerges victorious. The two are cold to each other throughout the day until, as a show of good faith, Michael promotes Dwight to Assistant Regional Manager.
13	7	"The Client"	Greg Daniels	Paul Lieberstein	November 8, 2005	2005	7.46
Michael and the Vice President of Northeast Sales, Jan Levinson, meet an important client. Michael angers Jan with his antics and refusal to talk business, but he and the client form a bond, and he closes the deal. Jan is impressed, so much so that she spends the night with Michael. Back at the office, the employees find and act out a screenplay written by Michael.
14	8	"Performance Review"	Paul Feig	Larry Wilmore	November 15, 2005	2009	7.99
Michael conferences with the employees during their annual performance reviews, while he worries about his own upcoming performance review with Jan. He takes tips from the suggestion box on ways to better himself, but the attempt ends in disaster when Jan discovers that Michael has told his employees about their romantic encounter.
15	9	"Email Surveillance"	Paul Feig	Jennifer Celotta	November 22, 2005	2008	8.09
Jim is hosting a party at his home, but has not invited Michael, who learns of this when he begins spying on his employees' emails. Pam begins to notice Dwight and accountant Angela Martin engaging in odd interactions, and suspects that they are in a relationship, but dismisses the idea after comparing it to her friendship with Jim. Meanwhile, unable to distract himself with an improvisational comedy class, Michael crashes Jim's party.
16	10	"Christmas Party"	Charles McDougall	Michael Schur	December 6, 2005	2010	9.74
The office Christmas party turns into a disaster when Michael decides to give all of the employees the ability to steal each other's Secret Santa gifts. While Michael attempts to procure a better gift, the rest of the staff all attempt to win the iPod that Michael originally bought for Ryan. Seeing that his idea has ruined the party, Michael buys alcohol for everyone.
17	11	"Booze Cruise"	Ken Kwapis	Greg Daniels	January 5, 2006	2013	8.73
Michael rents a boat for the annual motivational cruise, where he angers the captain, Jack (Rob Riggle), with his antics. A drunken Roy publicly sets a wedding date without consulting his fiancée Pam. This makes a saddened Jim realize that he is still in love with Pam and he breaks up with his girlfriend Katy. Jim reveals his feelings for Pam to Michael, but hides the fact that he still loves her.
18	12	"The Injury"	Bryan Gordon	Mindy Kaling	January 12, 2006	2011	10.27
Michael burns his foot on a George Foreman grill while at his own home. He requests that one of the employees of the office come to his house to pick him up. Dwight volunteers, but crashes his car. Dwight suffers a concussion, but it brings out his good-natured side, and he is kind and helpful to the other employees. Jim later takes Michael and Dwight to the hospital.
19	13	"The Secret"	Dennie Gordon	Lee Eisenberg & Gene Stupnitsky	January 19, 2006	2014	8.70
Jim becomes nervous when Michael almost reveals that he is in love with Pam. He asks Michael not to tell anyone, but the secret gets out anyway. Jim then tells Pam that he had a crush on her years ago, but pretends that it ended when he found out she was engaged. Meanwhile, accountant Oscar Martinez calls in sick, prompting Dwight to spy on him to determine whether he was telling the truth. His investigation reveals that Oscar is gay, but Dwight fails to notice this.
20	14	"The Carpet"	Victor Nelli, Jr.	Paul Lieberstein	January 26, 2006	2012	8.60
Michael discovers someone has defecated in his office. He suspects that one of his employees did it out of hate, leading him to begin resenting them. He later realizes that it was his "best friend," traveling salesman Todd Packer who did it, and instantly finds the humor in the action.
21	15	"Boys and Girls"	Dennie Gordon	B. J. Novak	February 2, 2006	2015	9.21
Jan comes to Scranton to lead a seminar for the women in the office. Michael becomes upset when he is left out, and decides to host his own seminar for the men. When he tries to rally the staff to unionize, Jan's threat of a lawsuit ends the attempt. Later, after Jan recommends to Pam that she should enter a graphic design course, Roy persuades her not to go through with it.
22	16	"Valentine's Day"	Greg Daniels	Michael Schur	February 9, 2006	2016	8.95
On Valentine's Day, Michael leaves for New York City for a meeting between branch managers and the company's new CFO, David Wallace. Michael tells the other branch managers that he and Jan are in a relationship, and a disgruntled manager later tells David. Michael is able to save both his and Jan's jobs when he tells David that he was joking. At the office, saleswoman Phyllis's boyfriend sends her multiple gifts, and Dwight and Angela secretly exchange gifts of their own.
23	17	"Dwight's Speech"	Charles McDougall	Paul Lieberstein	March 2, 2006	2017	8.45
Dwight is named Dunder Mifflin's top salesman, and is given the honor of speaking at a salesman's convention. He becomes nervous, and Jim "helps" by giving Dwight lines from speeches by controversial figures like Adolf Hitler and Benito Mussolini. At the convention, Dwight becomes nervous, but after a failed attempt by Michael to entertain the crowd, Dwight goes to the stand and delivers a rousing speech.
24	18	"Take Your Daughter to Work Day"	Victor Nelli, Jr.	Mindy Kaling	March 16, 2006	2018	8.85
The employees bring in their daughters for the annual Take Your Daughter to Work Day. Michael finds enjoyment in talking with the children, especially Toby's daughter Sasha, making him realize that he wants a family. Salesman Stanley Hudson's teenage daughter seems interested in Ryan, leading Stanley to reprimand Ryan for it after customer service representative Kelly Kapoor misleads Stanley about their conversation.
25	19	"Michael's Birthday"	Ken Whittingham	Gene Stupnitsky & Lee Eisenberg	March 30, 2006	2019	7.85
Michael is excited about his birthday, but the rest of the office is instead focused on accountant Kevin Malone, who is awaiting the results from a skin cancer test. Jim and Pam leave to purchase items to comfort Kevin, and later in the day the entire staff goes to the ice rink. Michael encounters his realtor Carol there, and makes a good impression when he entertains her kids. Kevin's test results come back negative for cancer.
26	20	"Drug Testing"	Greg Daniels	Jennifer Celotta	April 27, 2006	2022	7.85
Dwight finds a leftover joint in the parking lot, and begins an investigation to find the owner. After no one confesses, he schedules a drug test. Michael, worried that he will not pass, pressures Dwight for a cup of clean urine. Dwight is conflicted, but gives in to Michael's demand, and afterward resigns as a volunteer sheriff's deputy for breaking his oath.
27	21	"Conflict Resolution"	Charles McDougall	Greg Daniels	May 4, 2006	2020	7.45
Michael learns that Toby keeps files detailing all of the complaints employees have had against each other. Angry that the disputes have not been resolved, Michael reads them out loud, which brings up old conflicts and leaves the employees bitter and angry. Dwight's conflict resolution meeting with Jim causes the latter to have an epiphany about his work situation. Angered that someone complained about her wedding planning, Pam tries to figure out who it was.
28	22	"Casino Night"^{†}	Ken Kwapis	Steve Carell	May 11, 2006	2021	7.66
Michael organizes a casino night for charity, but inadvertently invites two dates, his boss Jan Levinson and his realtor Carol Stills. He ends up beginning a relationship with Carol. Jan reacts calmly, but later leaves early with an overnight bag, revealing that she had intended to stay with Michael. Jim considers transferring to another branch, but is hesitant to say exactly why. At the casino night, Jim finally reveals to Pam that he is in love with her. At first, Pam claims that she does not feel the same, but later the two share a kiss.

== DVD release ==
The second season of The Office was released by Universal Studios Home Entertainment as a four-disc Region 1 DVD box set on September 12, 2006. The set includes all 22 episodes presented in a 1.78:1 aspect ratio with Dolby Digital 5.1 Surround sound and optional English and Spanish subtitles. The release also included an array of bonus materials, including audio commentaries for 10 episodes, as well as deleted scenes from every episode of the season. Additional special features include the "Faces of Scranton" music video, a series of fake Public Service Announcements, the "Steve on Steve" featurette, a blooper reel, "The Accountants" webisodes, and a promotional spot for the 2006 Winter Olympics.

== Explanatory notes ==
^† denotes a "super-sized" 40-minute episode (with advertisements; actual runtime around 28 minutes).
^i Information on individual episode ratings can be found in the "Episodes" section.
