= Boys and Girls (The Office) =

- The Office episode
- Episode no.: Season 2 Episode 15
- Directed by: Dennie Gordon
- Written by: B. J. Novak
- Cinematography by: Randall Einhorn
- Editing by: Dean Holland
- Production code: 2015
- Original air date: February 2, 2006
- Running time: 22 minutes

Guest appearances
- Patrice O'Neal as Lonny Collins; Craig Robinson as Darryl Philbin; Karly Rothenberg as Madge

Episode chronology
← Previous "The Carpet"	Next → "Valentine's Day"
- The Office (American season 2)

"Boys and Girls" is the fifteenth episode of the second season of the American comedy television series The Office and the show's twenty-first episode overall. It was written by B. J. Novak and directed by Dennie Gordon and first aired on February 2, 2006, on NBC. The episode guest stars Melora Hardin as Jan Levinson, Craig Robinson as Darryl Philbin, and Patrice O'Neal as Lonny.

The series depicts the everyday lives of office employees in the Scranton, Pennsylvania branch of the fictional Dunder Mifflin Paper Company. In this episode, Michael Scott (Steve Carell) becomes frustrated when he is not allowed to listen in on a "women in the workplace" seminar that Jan is conducting, so he conducts his own "men in the workplace" seminar in the warehouse, where talk of a warehouse union emerges. Meanwhile, Pam Beesly (Jenna Fischer) considers graphic design.

The genesis for the episode came from an idea cast members Angela Kinsey and Fischer had while spending time together on the set of the series. During the filming, Carell and the warehouse men were filmed on one set and Fischer and the office women filmed on another. The episode was viewed by 9.21 million viewers. "Boys and Girls" received largely positive reviews from critics.

== Plot ==
Jan Levinson leads the female Dunder Mifflin employees in a "women in the workplace" seminar. Miffed at being excluded, Michael Scott conducts a competing “men in the workplace” seminar in the warehouse. Roy Anderson approaches Jim Halpert about the gossip that Jim used to like Pam and assures Jim that he is not mad. Darryl Philbin and his equally irritated crew are forced to participate in Michael's shenanigans, which culminate in Michael driving a reach truck and knocking down several shelves.

Michael's recklessness makes a complete mess of the warehouse while jeopardizing the employees' safety. Michael's plan to hold his own seminar backfires when the 'gripe session' inspires the warehouse workers to form a union. A vacillating Michael informs Jan, who directs him to warn the warehouse workers that corporate will shut down the entire Scranton branch if there is a threat of unionization. When Michael continually backs down, Jan informs them herself.

Jan urges Pam to take a corporate training program in graphic design in New York City when Pam reveals that she wants to be a graphic designer. She decides to take it after consulting Jim, but Roy quashes the idea. Jim rebukes Pam for backing down on her dream and not taking chances, which creates tension between them. Pam tells the documentary crew she is happy with her life now, but then breaks down and cries in front of the camera. As the day comes to a close, Michael leaves the warehouse in complete disarray, and Darryl promises that “this isn't over.”

== Production ==
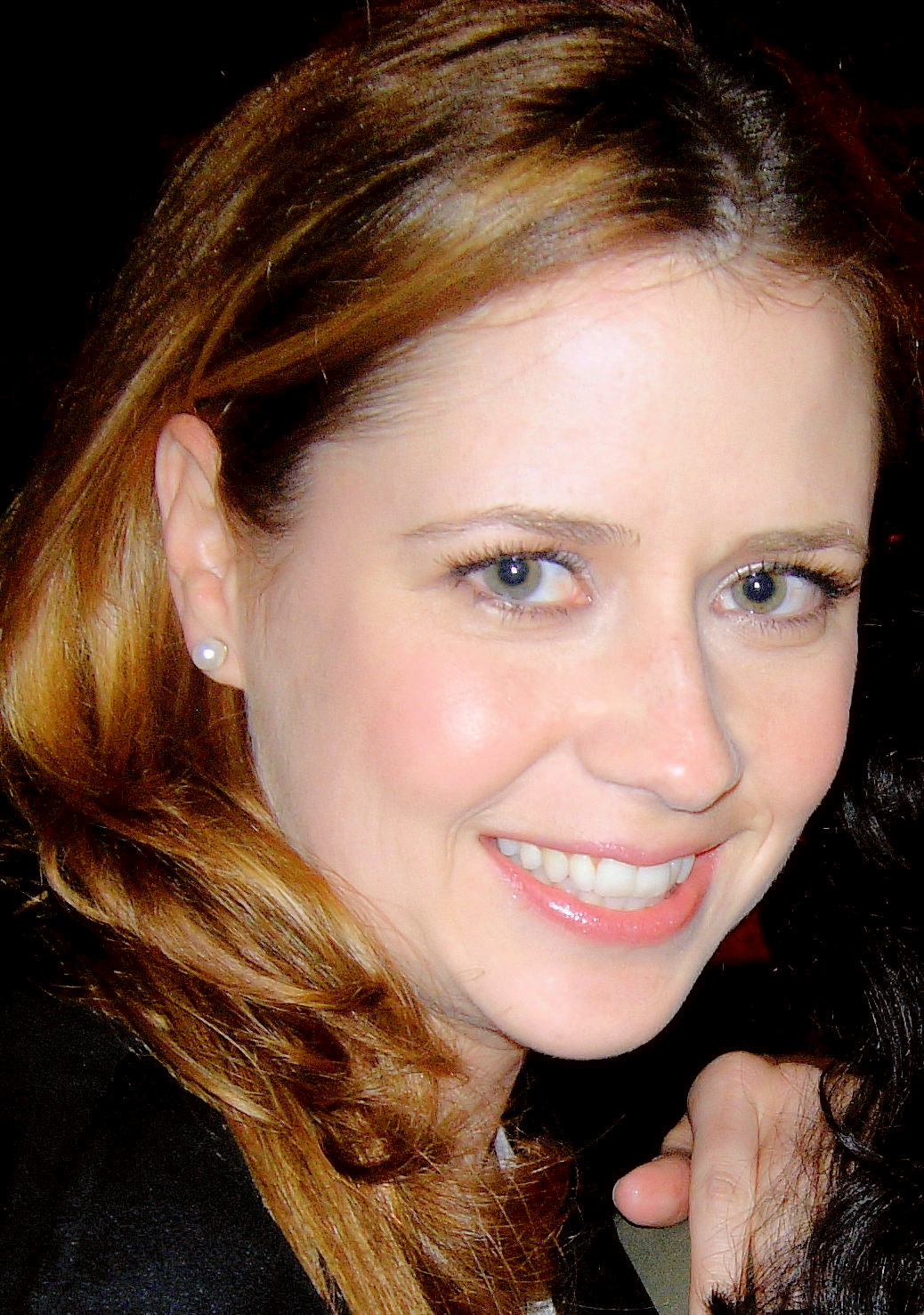
Jenna Fischer (pictured) and Angela Kinsey came up with the idea for the episode while on the set of The Office.

"Boys and Girls" was directed by Dennie Gordon; it was written by B. J. Novak, who plays Ryan Howard on the show. The genesis for the episode came from cast members Angela Kinsey and Jenna Fischer. The two originally formulated the premise while spending time together on the set of The Office: "What if Jan came into the office and did a 'Women in the Workplace' seminar, and Michael got all jealous?" They presented their concept to executive producer Greg Daniels, who liked the idea. Daniels subsequently assigned the idea to Novak, who crafted the final episode. Pam's monologue on reading about a girl who lived in a house with a terrace was based on a real book from the Choose Your Own Adventure series (although not specifically identified as such in the episode) that Fischer had read when she was a child. When the show's cast and crew appeared at the Paley Center, Fischer related that Novak asked her if she had any personal stories that could relate to what Pam was feeling at the time the episode was being written. She then came up with the storybook idea, which was immediately written and filmed for the episode.

Fischer later called the episode "both the most masculine and most feminine episode of The Office yet". This is largely because, during the filming, the different sections were shot separately: Carell and the warehouse filmed on one set and Fischer and the office women filmed on another. The women of The Office later said that "it was great" to spend time with each other. Fischer later claimed that the women spent a large part of the filming time talking and "behav[ing] like seventh-graders."

The Season Two DVD contains four deleted scenes from this episode: Michael asking Pam for help choosing a ringtone, Roy and Dwight talking about guns, Dwight shooting his spud gun at the Michael doll, and Dwight trying to remember the name of the film The Wizard of Oz.

== Cultural references ==
Michael compares modern working women to Ally McBeal, the titular lead of the American legal comedy-drama television series of the same name. Dwight compares venturing into the warehouse to the television series Lost, specifically when the characters in Lost meet the mysterious "Others". When Michael is sitting with his shirt unbuttoned, one of the warehouse workers calls him "Hasselhoff", a reference to actor David Hasselhoff. Kelly baits Jan by feigning ignorance about the various baseball metaphors for sex. The blow-up doll with Michael's face on it is a reference to the earlier second season episode "Sexual Harassment".

== Reception ==
"Boys and Girls" originally aired on NBC in the United States on February 2, 2006. The installment was viewed by 9.21 million viewers.

"Boys and Girls received largely positive reviews from television critics. Michael Sciannamea of AOL TV called it "another brilliant episode", noting that Carell was "at his obnoxious and comedic best". He also complimented the maturation of Jim and Pam's relationship, writing that it "seems like it's coming to a cliffhanger in the next few weeks". M. Giant of Television Without Pity gave the episode a positive review and awarded it an "A−". Brendan Babish of DVD Verdict awarded the episode a "B" and called it "a solid but uneventful" outing for the show.

Elements of "Boys and Girls" have been analyzed in a legal context. Jan's threat to have the warehouse closed if the employees unionize is unlawful under the National Labor Relations Act of 1935. American Rights at Work analyzed the episode and noted that "the show served up the hard truth about how far employers will go to stop their employees from forming a union."
