= Dennie Gordon =

American film and television director

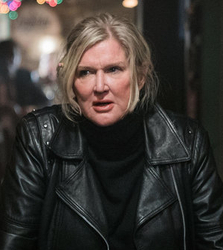
- Gordon in 2018
- Born: Robbinsdale, Minnesota, U.S.
- Education: Gustavus Adolphus College (BA); Yale University (MFA)
- Occupations: Film director, television director
- Years active: 1994–present

Dennie Gordon is an American film and television director. Her directorial television credits include Party of Five, Sports Night, Ally McBeal, The Practice, Grounded for Life, The Loop, White Collar, Burn Notice, Hell on Wheels, Waco, The Office and other series. She has also directed the feature films Joe Dirt, New York Minute and What a Girl Wants.

In 2000, Gordon won the DGA Award for DGA Award for Outstanding Directorial Achievement in Musical/Variety for episode of the HBO series, Tracey Takes On... starring Tracey Ullman. She is a graduate of Gustavus Adolphus College and the Yale School of Drama.

== Filmography ==
- Joe Dirt (2001)
- What a Girl Wants (2003)
- New York Minute (2004)
- My Lucky Star (2013) (Also writer)

Television
Year	Title	Director	Executive Producer	Episodes	Notes
1995	Picket Fences	Yes	No	"Witness for the Prosecution"	
1996	Chicago Hope	Yes	No	"Life Lines"	
1996	Relativity	Yes	No	"No Job Too Small"	
1996-1997	Party of Five	Yes	No	"Hitting Bottom"; "Christmas"; "Deal with It"	
1997	Michael Hayes	Yes	No	"Radio Killer"	
1997	Nash Bridges	Yes	No	"Sniper"	
1998	Dawson's Creek	Yes	No	"Crossroads"	
1999	Tracey Takes On...	Yes	No	"End of the World"; "Books", "Scandal"; "Hair"; "Drugs"; "Dating"	
1999	Snoops	Yes	No	"Bedfellas"	
1998-1999	Sports Night	Yes	No	"A Girl Named Pixley"; "The Reunion"; "Kyle Whitaker's Got Two Sacks"; "Shoe Money Tonight"	
1997-2000	Ally McBeal	Yes	No	"Out in the Cold"; "Love Unlimited"; "Theme of Life"; "The Kiss"	
1999-2000	Jack & Jill	Yes	No	"The #@$%!*& Future"; "Animal Planet: Part 1"; "Not Just a River in Egypt"	
2001	DAG	Yes	No	"Guns and Roses"; "Prom"	
2002	Glory Days	Yes	No	"Pilot"	
2001-2002	Grounded for Life	Yes	No	"Dust in the Wind"; "Safety Dance"; "Take It to the Limit"; "We Are Family"; "Don't Let Me Download"; "Like a Virgin"	
2005	Beautiful People	Yes	No	"Point and Shoot"; "Pilot"	
2005	Everybody Hates Chris	Yes	No	"Everybody Hates Christmas"	
2005	Kitchen Confidential	Yes	No	"Rabbit Test"	
2006	The Office	Yes	No	"Boys and Girls"; "The Secret"	
2006	What About Brian	Yes	No	"What About Secrets..."	
2007	30 Rock	Yes	No	"The Fighting Irish"	
2007	The Wedding Bells	Yes	No	"Partly Cloudy, with a Chance of Disaster"	
2006-2007	The Loop	Yes	No	"Fatty"; "Yeah, Presents"; "The Phantom"; "The Year of the Dog"	
2007	12 Miles of Bad Road	Yes	No	"Collateral Verbiage"	
2008	Samantha Who?	Yes	No	"The Birthday"	
2009	The Ex List	Yes	No	"The Other Foot"; "Daphne's Idealized Wedding"	
2010	The Deep End	Yes	No	"An Innocent Man"	
2010	True Jackson, VP	Yes	No	"True Date"	
2010	Notes from the Underbelly	Yes	No	"The Weekend"	
2010	The Good Guys	Yes	No	"Silvio's Way"	
2010	The Glades	Yes	No	"Breaking 80"	
2010	Hellcats	Yes	No	"Think Twice Before You Go"	
2011	The Cape	Yes	No	"Scales"	
2009-2011	Royal Pains	Yes	No	"A History of Violins"; "If I Were a Sick Man"	
2011	Outsourced	Yes	No	"Take This Punjab and Shove It"	
2009-2011	White Collar	Yes	No	"Dentist of Detroit"; "Vital Signs"; "Threads"	
2011	Suits	Yes	No	"Dirty Little Secrets"	
2009-2013	Burn Notice	Yes	No	"Brother in Arms"; "Under the Gun"; "Eyes Open"; "Hard Times"; "Fast Friends"; "Good Intentions"; "End Run"; "Sins of Omission"	
2014	Rectify	Yes	No	"Sleeping Giants"	
2013-2014	Hell on Wheels	Yes	No	"Reckoning"; "Chicken Hill"; "Range War"	
2015	12 Monkeys	Yes	No	"Paradox"	
2015	Grace and Frankie	Yes	No	"The Sex"	
2015	Under the Dome	Yes	No	"Legacy"	
2014-2015	Madam Secretary	Yes	No	"Lights Out"; "The Rusalka"; "The Necessary Art"; "Need to Know"	
2016	Bloodline	Yes	No	"Part 18"	
2016	Feed the Beast	Yes	No	"In Lies the Truth"; "Tabula Rasa"	
2014-2016	Kingdom	Yes	No	"Cut Man"; "Help Wanted"; "The Gentle Slope"; "Animator/Annihilator"	
2016	Empire	Yes	No	"The Unkindest Cut"	
2017	Legion	Yes	No	"Chapter 7"	
2015-2017	Power	Yes	No	"New Man"; "You're Not the Man"	
2018	Waco	Yes	No	"Stalling for Time"; "Of Milk and Men"	
2018	Goliath	Yes	Yes	"Tongue Tied"; "Who's Gabriel"; "Fresh Flowers"; "Alo"	
2019	Jack Ryan	Yes	Yes	"Persona Non Grata"; "Dios y Federación"; "Blue Gold"	
2020	AJ and the Queen	Yes	No	"Fort Worth"	
2020	Hunters	Yes	No	"At Night, All Birds Are Black"	
2020-2023	Warrior	Yes	No	"Enter the Dragon"; "Man on the Wall"; "Gotta Be Crooked Along in a Crooked World"; "You Know When You're Losing a Fight"	
2021	For All Mankind	Yes	No	"Don't Be Cruel"; "And Here's to You"	
2022	Last Light	Yes	No	"The Dawning"; "Twilight"; "Darkness Falls"; "Dead of Night"; "Illumination"	
2022	From Scratch	Yes	No	"Bitter Almonds"; "Bread and Brine"; "Heirlooms"	
2024	Halo	Yes	No	"Thermopylae"; "Halo"	
