= The Office (American TV series) =

American mockumentary sitcom (2005–2013)

- Genre: Mockumentary; Sitcom; Workplace comedy; Cringe comedy
- Based on: The Office by: Ricky Gervais; Stephen Merchant
- Developed by: Greg Daniels
- Showrunners: Greg Daniels; Paul Lieberstein; Jennifer Celotta
- Starring: Steve Carell; Rainn Wilson; John Krasinski; Jenna Fischer; B. J. Novak; Melora Hardin; David Denman; Leslie David Baker; Brian Baumgartner; Kate Flannery; Angela Kinsey; Oscar Nunez; Phyllis Smith; Ed Helms; Mindy Kaling; Paul Lieberstein; Creed Bratton; Craig Robinson; Ellie Kemper; Zach Woods; Amy Ryan; James Spader; Catherine Tate; Clark Duke; Jake Lacy
- Theme music composer: Jay Ferguson
- Country of origin: United States
- Original language: English
- No. of seasons: 9
- No. of episodes: 201 (list of episodes)

Production
- Executive producers: Ben Silverman; Greg Daniels; Ricky Gervais; Stephen Merchant; Howard Klein; Ken Kwapis; Paul Lieberstein; B. J. Novak; Brent Forrester; Dan Sterling
- Producers: Kent Zbornak; Randy Cordray; Steve Burgess
- Cinematography: Randall Einhorn; Matt Sohn; Sarah Levy; Peter Smokler (pilot)
- Editors: David Rogers; Dean Holland; Claire Scanlon
- Camera setup: Single-camera
- Running time: 22–42 minutes
- Production companies: Deedle-Dee Productions; 3 Arts Entertainment (uncredited); Shine America (Note: Previously credited as Reveille Productions for the first eight seasons); Universal Television (Note: Previously credited as NBC Universal Television Studio in seasons 1–4 and Universal Media Studios in seasons 4–8)

Original release
- Network: NBC
- Release: March 24, 2005 – May 16, 2013

Related
- The Office (British TV series); The Paper

The Office is an American mockumentary sitcom television series. It is based on the BBC series The Office created by Ricky Gervais and Stephen Merchant, and adapted for NBC by Greg Daniels. The show depicts the everyday work lives of office employees at the Scranton, Pennsylvania branch of the fictional Dunder Mifflin Paper Company. It aired from March 24, 2005, to May 16, 2013, for a total of nine seasons consisting of 201 episodes. The show was co-produced by Daniels' Deedle-Dee Productions, Reveille Productions (later Shine America), and 3 Arts Entertainment (although uncredited) in association with Universal Television. The original executive producers were Daniels, Gervais, Merchant, Howard Klein, and Ben Silverman, with numerous others being promoted in later seasons.

Like the British original, which aired from 2001 to 2003, the series was filmed in a single-camera setup without a studio audience or a laugh track, to mirror the look of an actual documentary. It debuted on NBC as a mid-season replacement and ended its nine-season run on May 16, 2013, with a two-part series finale. Its original main cast was Steve Carell, Rainn Wilson, John Krasinski, Jenna Fischer, and B. J. Novak. It experienced numerous changes to its ensemble cast during its run. Stars outside the original main cast include Ed Helms, Rashida Jones, Amy Ryan, Mindy Kaling, Craig Robinson, James Spader, Ellie Kemper, and Catherine Tate.

The Office received moderately positive reviews from critics (except for the pilot episode which received mixed reviews) during its relatively short first season of six episodes, but the following seasons, particularly Carell's performance, received significant acclaim from television critics as the show's characters, content, structure, and tone diverged considerably from the original British series. These seasons were included on several critics' year-end top TV series lists, winning several awards including a Peabody Award in 2006, two Screen Actors Guild Awards, a Golden Globe Award for Carell's performance, and five Primetime Emmy Awards, including one for Outstanding Comedy Series, in 2006. The eighth season was criticized for declining quality, with Carell's departure in season seven seen as a contributing factor. However, the ninth and final season ended the series with a generally positive response. The series finale, which originally aired on May 16, 2013, was viewed by an estimated 5.7 million viewers and garnered critical acclaim. In 2016, Rolling Stone named The Office one of the 100 greatest television shows of all time.

== Production ==
=== Crew ===
Greg Daniels adapted the British The Office series for American television and served as the showrunner for the first four seasons. He then left the position when he co-created the comedy series Parks and Recreation with fellow The Office writer Michael Schur and divided his time between both series. Paul Lieberstein and Jennifer Celotta were named the showrunners for the fifth season. Celotta left the series after the sixth season and Lieberstein stayed on as showrunner for the following two seasons. He left the showrunner spot after the eighth season for the potential Dwight Schrute spin-off, The Farm, which was eventually passed on by NBC. Daniels returned to the showrunner position for the ninth and final season. Other executive producers include cast members B. J. Novak and Mindy Kaling. Kaling, Novak, Daniels, Lieberstein, and Schur made up the original team of writers. Kaling, Novak, and Lieberstein also served multiple roles on the series, as they played regular characters on the show, as well as wrote, directed, and produced numerous episodes. Credited with twenty-four episodes, Kaling is the most prolific writer among the staff. Ricky Gervais and Stephen Merchant, who created the original British series, are credited as executive producers and wrote both pilot and the third-season episode "The Convict". Merchant later directed the episode "Customer Survey", while Gervais appeared briefly in the episodes "The Seminar" and "Search Committee", reprising his role as David Brent from the British series.

Randall Einhorn is the most frequent director of the series, with 15 credited episodes. The series also had many guest directors, including Lost co-creator J. J. Abrams, Buffy the Vampire Slayer creator Joss Whedon, both of whom are fans of the series, and filmmakers Jon Favreau, Harold Ramis, Jason Reitman, and Marc Webb. Episodes have been directed by several of the actors on the show including Steve Carell, Rainn Wilson, John Krasinski, B. J. Novak, Ed Helms, Brian Baumgartner, Mindy Kaling, and Paul Lieberstein.

=== Development and writing ===
Before the second episode airing, the writers spent time conducting research in offices. This process was used for Daniels' other series King of the Hill and Parks and Recreation. The pilot is a direct adaptation of the first episode of the original British series. Daniels chose to go this route because "completely starting from scratch would be a very risky thing to do" owing to the show being an adaptation. He had briefly considered using the idea for "The Dundies" as the pilot episode. After the writers knew who the cast was, they were allowed to write for the actors, which allowed the show to be more original for the following episode, "Diversity Day". Following the mixed reaction toward the first season, the writers attempted to make the series more "optimistic" and to make Michael Scott more likable. They also established the supporting characters of the series more, giving them relatable personalities. They also made the lights in the office brighter, which allowed the series to differentiate itself from the British series.

A common issue with the scripts, according to Novak, is that they tended to run too long for the regular 22-minute time slot, leading to several cuts. For example, the script for the episode "Search Committee" was initially 75 pages, which was 10 pages too long. A complete script was written for each episode; however, actors were given opportunities to improvise during filming. Fischer said, "Our shows are 100 percent scripted. They put everything down on paper. But we get to play around a little bit, too. Steve and Rainn are brilliant improvisers." These improvisations led to a large number of deleted scenes with almost every episode of The Office, all of which are considered part of the series' canon and storyline by Daniels. Deleted scenes have sometimes been restored in repeats to make episodes longer or draw back people who have seen the episode before to see the bonus footage. In an experiment, a deleted scene from "The Return" was made available over NBC.com and iTunes, explaining the absence of a character over the next several episodes. Daniels hoped that word of mouth among fans would spread the information, but he eventually considered the experiment a failure.

=== Casting ===
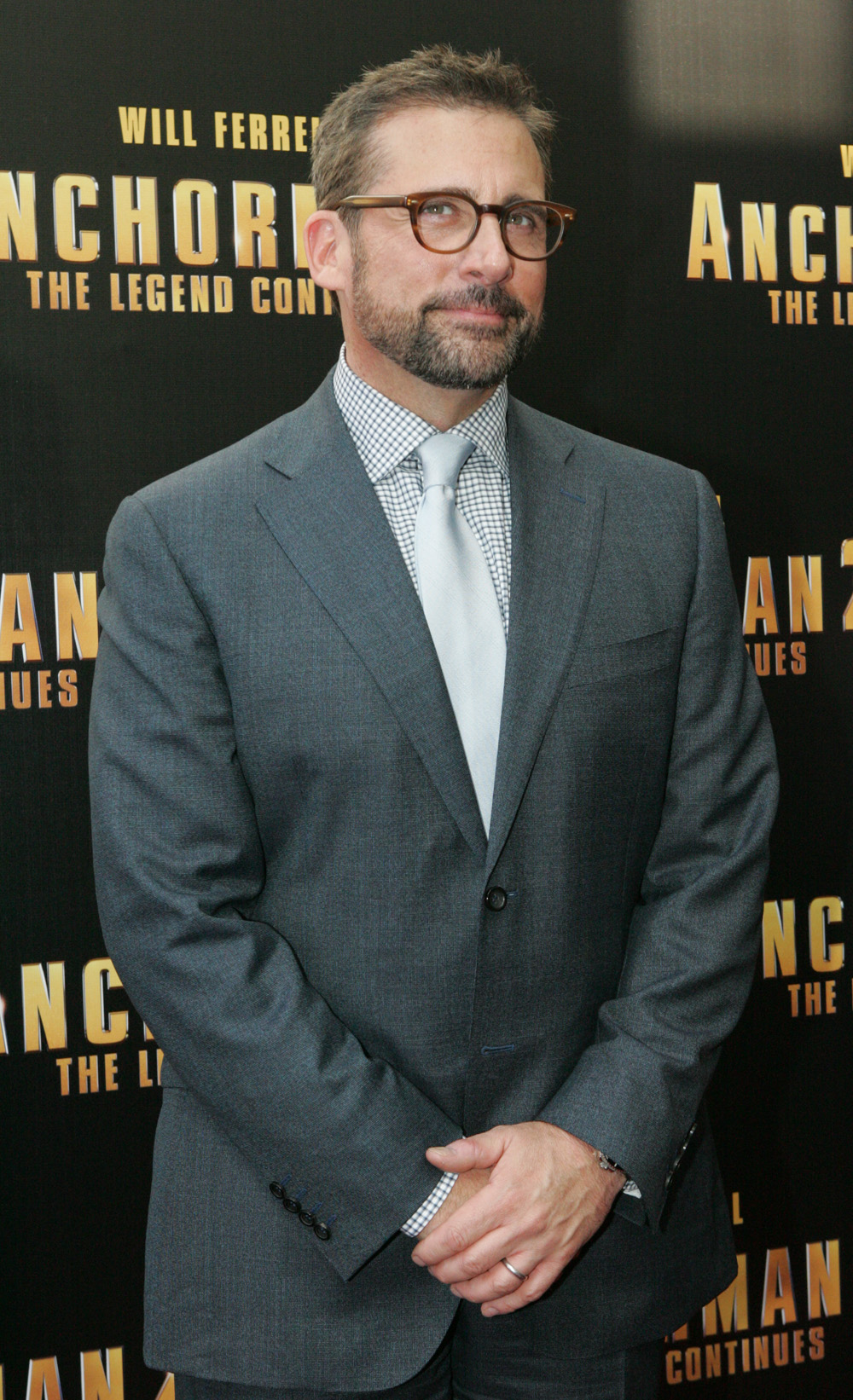
Steve Carell, who plays lead character Michael Scott

According to Jenna Fischer, the series used an unusual casting process that did not involve a script. For example, the producers asked the actors several questions and they responded as the characters they were auditioning for. NBC programmer Kevin Reilly originally suggested Paul Giamatti to producer Ben Silverman for the role of Michael Scott, but the actor declined. Martin Short, Hank Azaria, and Bob Odenkirk were reported to be interested in the part. Silverman offered the role to Ricky Gervais, who played David Brent in the British series, but he declined as he felt it would not make sense and did not want to move to the United States.

In January 2004, Variety reported that Steve Carell, of the Comedy Central program The Daily Show with Jon Stewart, was in talks to play the role. At the time, he was already committed to another NBC midseason replacement comedy, Come to Papa, but the series was quickly canceled, allowing his full commitment to The Office. Carell later said that he had only seen about half of the original pilot episode of the British series before he auditioned. He did not continue watching for fear that he would start copying Gervais' characterizations. Other people who were considered or auditioned for the role included Ben Falcone, Alan Tudyk, Jim Zulevic, and Paul F. Tompkins. Rainn Wilson was cast as power-hungry sycophant Dwight Schrute, and he watched every episode of the British series before he auditioned. Wilson had originally auditioned for Michael, a performance that he described as a "terrible Ricky Gervais impersonation"; however, the casting directors liked his audition as Dwight much more and hired him. Seth Rogen, Matt Besser, Patton Oswalt, and Judah Friedlander also auditioned for the role. Carell was later joined by his wife Nancy Carell when she was cast to play Carol Stills, a love interest of Michael Scott. When asked what it was like working with her husband, Carell said she was intimidated at first as she had retired from acting years prior, but that they had fun together.

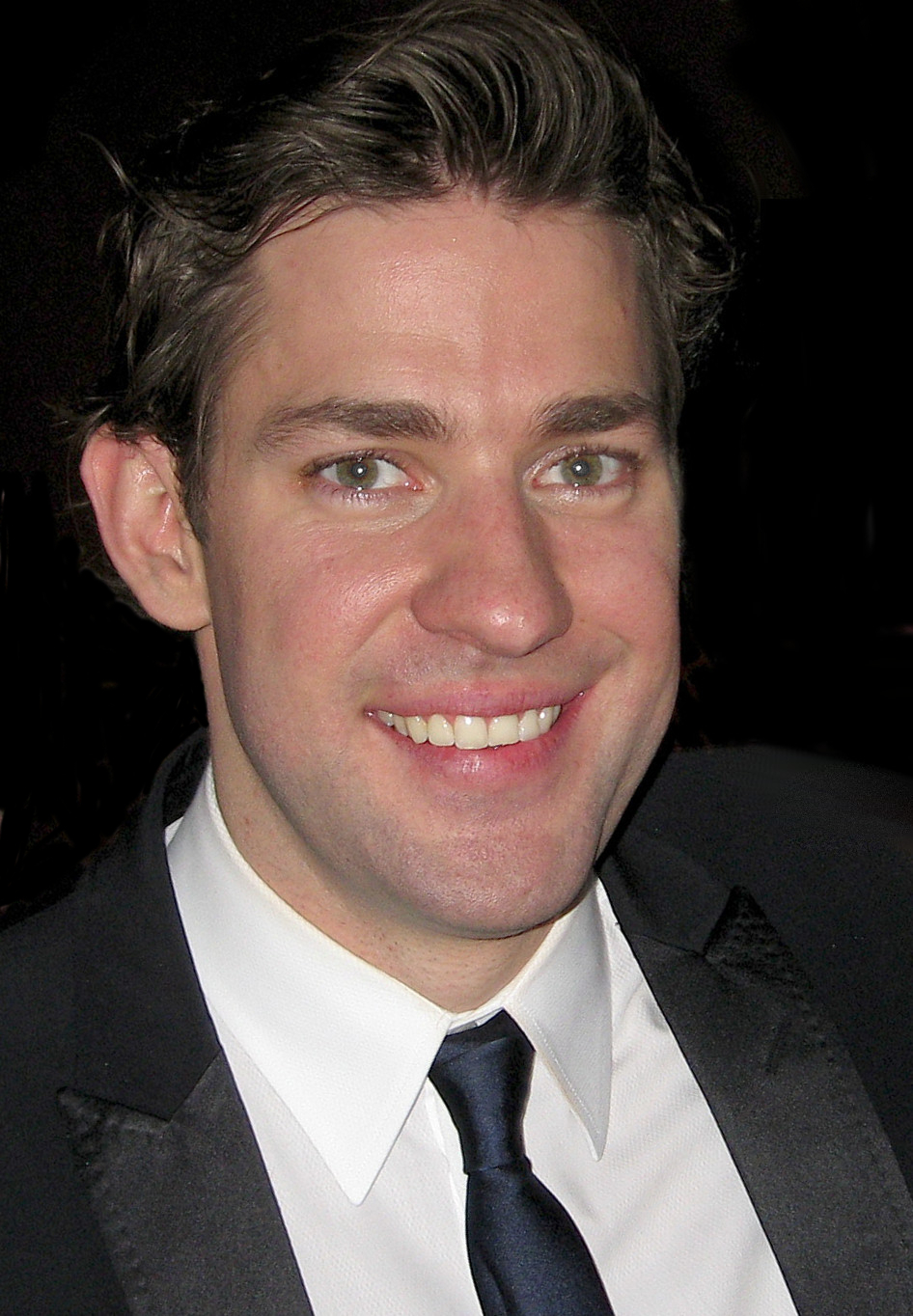
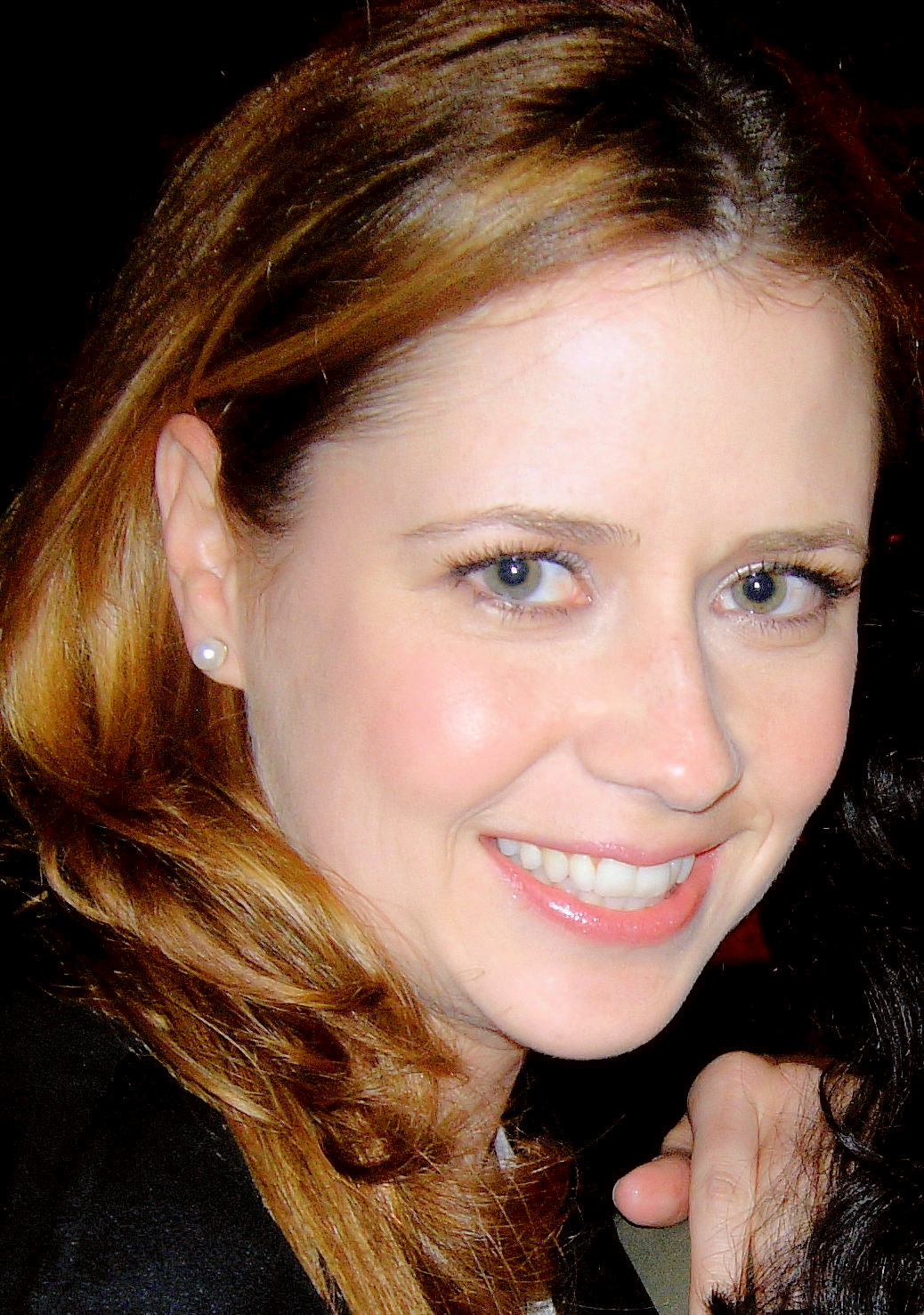
John Krasinski (left) and Jenna Fischer (right) were cast as the "will-they-won't-they" couple Jim Halpert and Pam Beesly; both actors were relatively unknown before the show's airing.

John Krasinski and Jenna Fischer were cast in their respective roles as Jim and Pam, the main love interests. Krasinski attended school with B. J. Novak, where the two were best friends. Before Krasinski landed the role, he considered quitting acting. He discussed on The Late Show with Stephen Colbert that he moved to New York City and gave himself two to three years for his acting career to succeed or he would quit. He did not enjoy waiting tables and struggling to find roles, but his mother told him to wait it out until the end of the year. He booked his role in The Office just three weeks later.

Fischer prepared for her audition by looking as boring as possible, creating the original Pam hairstyle. In an interview on NPR's Fresh Air, she recalled the last stages of the audition process for Pam and Jim, where the producers paired up the potential Pams and Jims (four of each) to gauge their chemistry. When Fischer finished her scene with Krasinski, he told her that she was his favorite Pam, to which she reciprocated that he was her favorite Jim. Adam Scott and John Cho both auditioned for the role of Jim, and Kathryn Hahn also auditioned for the role of Pam.

The supporting cast includes actors known for their improv work: Angela Kinsey, Kate Flannery, Oscar Nunez, Leslie David Baker, Brian Baumgartner, Melora Hardin, and David Denman. Kinsey originally auditioned for Pam. The producers thought she was "too feisty" for the character, but called her back for the part of Angela Martin, which she won. Flannery first auditioned for the part of Jan Levinson-Gould before landing the role of Meredith Palmer.

Baumgartner originally auditioned for Stanley, but was eventually cast as Kevin Malone. Ken Kwapis, the director of the pilot episode, liked the way Phyllis Smith, a casting associate, read with other actors auditioning so much that he cast her as Phyllis. At the beginning of the third season, Ed Helms and Rashida Jones joined the cast as members of Dunder Mifflin Stamford. Jones later left the cast, becoming a regular on Parks and Recreation in February 2007, and NBC announced that Helms was being promoted to a series regular.

Four of the show's writers have also appeared in the show. B. J. Novak was cast as the reluctant temp Ryan Howard after Daniels saw his stand-up act. Paul Lieberstein was cast as human resources director Toby Flenderson on Novak's suggestion after his cold readings of scripts. Greg Daniels was originally unsure where to use Mindy Kaling on-screen until the opportunity came in the script for the second episode, "Diversity Day", where Michael needed to be slapped by a minority. "Since [that slap], I've been on the show" (as Kelly Kapoor), Kaling said. Michael Schur has also made several guest appearances as Dwight's cousin Mose, and consulting producer Larry Wilmore has played diversity trainer Mr. Brown.

Plans were made for Mackenzie Crook, Martin Freeman, and Lucy Davis, from the British series, to appear in the third season, but scheduling conflicts prevented them; however, Ricky Gervais made two appearances in the show's seventh season as David Brent.

=== Filming ===
Dunder Mifflin company logo

The Office was filmed with a single-camera setup in cinéma vérité style to create the look of an actual documentary, with no studio audience or laugh track, allowing its "deadpan" and "absurd" humor to fully come across. The show's primary premise is that a camera crew is filming Dunder Mifflin and its employees, seemingly around the clock. The presence of the camera is acknowledged by the characters, especially Michael Scott, who enthusiastically participates in the filming. The characters, especially Jim and Pam, also look towards the camera when Michael creates an awkward situation. The show's main action is supplemented with talking-head interviews or "confessionals", where characters speak one-on-one with the camera. When John Krasinski found out he was cast as Jim, he visited Scranton for research and interviewed employees at actual paper companies. He shot the footage of Scranton for the opening credits.

To create the show's documentary style, the producers hired cinematographer Randall Einhorn, known for directing episodes of Survivor, who gave the show its "rough and jumpy" feel. This was facilitated by the main set's open floor plan, purposely designed by showrunner Daniels, production designer Donald Lee Harris (Matt Flynn became production designer later), and pilot director Ken Kwapis to allow camera operators to catch characters "unaware". Unlike most sets, the office layout was built with immovable walls to emphasize its airless, claustrophobic atmosphere—"trapping" the documentary film crew with the characters.

Producer Michael Schur said that the series would strictly follow the documentary format. The producers and directors had long discussions on how scenes could work in the documentary format. For example, in the fourth-season episode "Did I Stutter?", a scene featured Michael going through a long process to go to the bathroom without passing Stanley. The producers debated whether it was possible, and Einhorn walked through the scene to see if a camera operator could get everywhere to shoot the whole scene. Later seasons relaxed the format, with the camera crew often going where actual documentary crews would not. This also changed the series' writing and comedy styles, an inconsistency criticized by some reviewers and fans.

The first season of the show was filmed in a real office space in Culver City, California. The remaining seasons were filmed at Chandler Valley Center Studios in the San Fernando Valley.

=== Music ===
The Office theme
The song was written by Jay Ferguson and performed by The Scrantones.

When it came to choosing the theme music for The Office, producer Greg Daniels had several tracks he was thinking of using: existing songs including "Better Things" by The Kinks, "Float On" by Modest Mouse, "Mr. Blue Sky" by Electric Light Orchestra, and several original pieces artists contributed to the producers via a cattle call. Daniels decided that the cast would vote on what song to use and gave them four of the choices. Most of them wanted "Mr. Blue Sky", but that option turned out to be invalid as it was already used in the drama series LAX (2004–2005). Thus, the final choice was an original track written by Jay Ferguson and performed by The Scrantones.

The theme is played over the title sequence, which features scenes of Scranton, various tasks around the office, and the main cast members. Some episodes of the series use shortened versions of the theme song. Starting with the fourth season, the theme song is also played over the closing credits, which previously rolled in silence. Ferguson described his theme as "against type; it has this vulnerability, this yearning to it that soon explodes into this overdone optimism which then gets crushed – which is pretty much what the show is about."

The mockumentary format of the show contains no laugh track, and most of the music is diegetic, with songs either sung or played by the characters or heard on radios, computers, or other devices; however, songs have been played during montages or the closing credits, such as "Tiny Dancer" by Elton John ("The Dundies") and "Islands in the Stream" by Kenny Rogers and Dolly Parton ("E-mail Surveillance"). Featured music tends to be well known, and often songs reflect the character, such as Michael's attempt to seem hip by using "Mambo No. 5" and later "My Humps" as his cell phone ringtone. Daniels has said that it does not count as film score as long as it already appeared in the episode.

== Characters ==
The Office starring cast at the beginning of the third season. Characters, from left to right: Phyllis Lapin-Vance, Toby Flenderson, Jim Halpert (seated), Oscar Martinez, Pam Beesly, Angela Martin, Kelly Kapoor (seated), Ryan Howard, Creed Bratton, Michael Scott, Meredith Palmer, Kevin Malone, Dwight Schrute (seated), Jan Levinson, Stanley Hudson, and Roy Anderson

The Office features an ensemble cast. Many of its characters are based on characters in the original British series. While these characters generally have the same attitudes and perceptions as their British counterparts, the roles were modified to fit the American show. The show is known for its relatively large cast, and many of its actors and actresses are known particularly for their improvisational work.

Steve Carell stars as Michael Scott, regional manager of the Dunder Mifflin Scranton Branch. Loosely based on David Brent, Gervais' character in the British series, Scott is a well-intentioned man whose oblivious attempts at humor often offend and annoy his peers and employees, and sometimes draw reprimands from his superiors.

Rainn Wilson portrays Dwight Schrute, based on Gareth Keenan, who is a salesman and the Assistant to the Regional Manager, an imaginary title created by Michael.

John Krasinski portrays Jim Halpert, a salesman and, in later seasons, assistant manager or co-manager who is known for his wittiness and his practical jokes on Dwight. Halpert is based upon Tim Canterbury and, at the start of the series, is known to have feelings for receptionist Pam Beesly, who is engaged to warehouse worker Roy. Pam, played by Jenna Fischer, is based on Dawn Tinsley. She is shy but often collaborates with Jim in his pranks on Dwight.

B. J. Novak portrays Ryan Howard, who for the first two seasons is a temporary worker but is promoted to a sales representative in the third season. He later ascends to be the company's youngest vice president, North East Region, and director of new media until his innovations are exposed as corporate fraud and he is fired. He then gets a job in a bowling alley and later briefly works for the Michael Scott Paper Company. After this and a stint in rehab, he again eventually ends up as a temporary worker at the Scranton branch.

The accounting department includes Angela Martin (played by Angela Kinsey), an uptight and ultra-religious woman who likes to keep things orderly and make sure situations remain as businesslike as possible; Kevin Malone (Brian Baumgartner), a lovable but dim-witted man who revels in juvenile humor; and Oscar Martinez (Oscar Nuñez), who is intelligent and cultured, but often patronizing, and whose homosexuality and Hispanic heritage made him a frequent target of Michael's unintentional off-color comments.

Rounding out the office are the laconic salesman Stanley Hudson (Leslie David Baker), who cannot stand Michael's time-wasting meetings and constant references to his Black American heritage; the matronly saleswoman Phyllis Lapin (Phyllis Smith), who dates and then marries Bob Vance (Robert R. Shafer) from Vance Refrigeration, a company whose office is across the hall from Dunder Mifflin; eccentric quality assurance representative Creed Bratton (Creed Bratton), who has a mysterious criminal history; Andy Bernard (Ed Helms), a salesman from the Stamford, Connecticut branch of Dunder Mifflin introduced in season three who transfers to the Scranton branch after the two offices merge; Karen Filippelli (Rashida Jones) a short term love interest for Jim also from Stamford; the shallow and talkative customer service representative Kelly Kapoor (Mindy Kaling); the promiscuous alcoholic supply relations representative Meredith Palmer (Kate Flannery); human resources representative Toby Flenderson (Paul Lieberstein), who is loathed, and often the target of abuse, by Michael; warehouse foreman Darryl Philbin (Craig Robinson); warehouse dock worker and Pam's fiancé Roy Anderson (David Denman), who is fired in the third season for attacking Jim; and the vice president for regional sales for Dunder Mifflin Jan Levinson (Melora Hardin), who later becomes Michael's rather toxic love interest.

Toward the end of season five, the bubbly and naive Erin Hannon (Ellie Kemper) is introduced as Pam's replacement at the reception and develops a unique bond with Michael when he becomes almost a father figure in her life. A story arc at the end of season four has Holly Flax (Amy Ryan) transferred to the office as Toby's replacement. She becomes a love interest for Michael, as they share very similar personality traits. Jo Bennett (Kathy Bates) is the CEO of Sabre, a company that takes over Dunder Mifflin. Gabe Lewis (Zach Woods), introduced in the middle of season six, is a Sabre employee assigned to the Dunder Mifflin Scranton branch as the regional director of sales. In season seven, Bennett's friend Nellie Bertram (Catherine Tate) is interviewed to replace Scott and later serves as a replacement regional manager for Bernard in season eight after Robert California (James Spader) has become the new CEO of Sabre. In season nine, Clark Green (Clark Duke) and Pete Miller (Jake Lacy) join as new customer service representatives who attempt to catch up on the customer service complaints ignored by Kelly. Clark is later moved to sales.

Initially, the actors who portray the supporting office workers were credited as guest stars, but then were named series regulars during the second season. The show's large ensemble was mainly praised by critics and led to the series winning two Screen Actors Guild Award for Outstanding Performance by an Ensemble in a Comedy Series. Carell was reportedly paid $175,000 per episode starting in the third season. Krasinski and Fischer were paid around $20,000 at the beginning of the series, and around $100,000 per episode by the fourth season.

== Season synopses ==
A typical episode for a half-hour time slot runs 20 1/2 minutes. The final episode of season two introduced the first of what would be several "super-sized" episodes that had an approximately 28-minute running time for a 40-minute time slot. Season three introduced the first of occasional hour-long episodes (approximately 42-minute running time, also suitable for being shown as two separate normal episodes in reruns).

Season	Episodes	Originally released		Rank	Average viewership (in millions)
Season	Episodes	First released	Last released	Rank	Average viewership (in millions)
1	6	March 24, 2005	April 26, 2005	102	5.4
2	22	September 20, 2005	May 11, 2006	67	8.0
3	25	September 21, 2006	May 17, 2007	68	8.3
4	19	September 27, 2007	May 15, 2008	77	8.9
5	28	September 25, 2008	May 14, 2009	52	9.0
6	26	September 17, 2009	May 20, 2010	52	7.8
7	26	September 23, 2010	May 19, 2011	53	7.7
8	24	September 22, 2011	May 10, 2012	87	6.5
9	25	September 20, 2012	May 16, 2013	94	5.1

=== Season 1 (2005) ===
The first season consists of six episodes; the shortest season of the series.

The series starts by introducing Dunder Mifflin's employees via a tour given by branch manager Michael Scott for both a documentary camera crew and first-day temp Ryan Howard. Salesman Jim Halpert has a crush on receptionist Pam Beesly, who helps him play pranks on co-worker Dwight Schrute, even though she is engaged to Roy Anderson, who works in the company's downstairs warehouse. Rumors spread throughout the office that Dunder Mifflin's corporate headquarters is planning to downsize an entire branch, leading to general anxiety. Still, Michael chooses to deny or downplay the realities of the situation to maintain employee morale.

=== Season 2 (2005–06) ===
The second season is the series' first 22-episode season and has its first 28-minute "super-sized" episode.

Many workers seen in the background of the first season are developed into secondary characters and romantic relationships begin to develop between some of them. Michael makes out with and then spends the night with his boss, Jan Levinson, but does not have sex with her. Dwight and Angela become romantically involved, but keep their relationship a secret. Kelly Kapoor develops a crush on Ryan, and they start dating off and on. When Roy finally agrees to set a date for his wedding to Pam, at a company booze cruise, Jim grows depressed and considers transferring to the Stamford, Connecticut, branch, but tells Pam in the season finale that he is in love with her. Even though Pam insists she is with Roy, the two kiss, and Jim transfers to the Stamford branch soon after. The general threat of downsizing continues throughout the season as well.

=== Season 3 (2006–07) ===
The third season consists of 17 half-hour episodes, four 40-minute "super-sized" episodes, and two one-hour episodes. The total number of episodes is 25.

The season starts with a brief flashback to (and additional footage from) the last episode of season two, "Casino Night", when Jim kissed Pam and confessed his feelings for her. Jim briefly transfers to Dunder Mifflin's Stamford branch after Pam confirms her commitment to Roy. Corporate is later forced to merge the Stamford branch with the Scranton branch. Michael takes this merger very seriously. Transferred to the Scranton branch are saleswoman Karen Filippelli, whom Jim has begun dating, and the anger-prone preppy salesman Andy Bernard, along with other Stamford employees who all eventually quit within the first few episodes of being there. Pam is newly single after calling off her engagement to Roy, and Jim's unresolved feelings for her and his new relationship with Karen lead to shifting tensions between the three. Meanwhile, Michael and Jan's relationship escalates, which causes them to behave erratically on the job. On the other hand, Dwight and Angela continue their steamy secret relationship. In the season's finale, Jim, Karen, and Michael interview for a corporate position that turns out to be Jan's, who is fired for poor performance. Jim is offered the job but rejects it off-screen, opting instead to remain in Scranton without Karen and asking Pam out on a date, which she joyfully accepts. In the final scene, we learn Ryan has been awarded Jan's job.

=== Season 4 (2007–08) ===
NBC ordered a fourth full season of thirty half-hour episodes but ended with only 19 due to a halt in production caused by the 2007–2008 Writers Guild of America strike. The season consists of nine half-hour and five hour-long episodes for a total of 19 episodes of material created.

Karen has left the Scranton branch after her breakup with Jim and becomes the regional manager at the Utica branch. A self-employed Jan moves herself and her candle business into Michael's condo, until the dissolution of their relationship midway through the season during an intimate dinner party including Pam, Jim, Andy, Angela and Dwight. This episode showcases what has become a very toxic and unhealthy relationship between Michael and Jan. After Dwight's crude (though well-intentioned) method of euthanasia of Angela's ailing cat without her permission, she leaves him for Andy, leading Dwight into depression. Ryan, in his new corporate life in New York City, attempts to modernize Dunder Mifflin with a new website for online sales; he also learns that his boss, David Wallace, favors Jim, and thus Ryan attempts to sabotage Jim's career. Ryan is soon arrested and fired for misleading the shareholders and committing fraud related to the website's sales numbers. Toby announces he is moving to Costa Rica and is replaced by Holly Flax, who quickly shows a liking for Michael. Pam decides to follow her artistic interests and is accepted to attend a three-month graphic design course at the Pratt Institute in New York City. In the season finale, Jim almost proposes to Pam but is interrupted by Andy proposing to Angela, who reluctantly agrees. Phyllis then catches Dwight and Angela having sex in the office.

=== Season 5 (2008–09) ===
The fifth season consists of 28 half-hours of material, divided into 24 half-hour episodes and two hour-long episodes, one of which aired after Super Bowl XLIII.

Jim proposes to Pam at a gas station halfway between Scranton and New York City, where they meet for a visit. Pam ultimately returns from New York to Scranton, where Jim has bought his parents' house for the two of them. Having avoided jail and only been sentenced to community service, Ryan bleaches his hair and starts working at a bowling alley. Michael initiates a romance with Holly until she is transferred to the Nashua, New Hampshire, branch, Toby returns to Scranton to replace Holly, and their relationship ends. When Andy is made aware of Dwight and Angela's continued affair, both men leave her. Newly hired Vice President Charles Miner implements a rigid managerial style over the branch that causes Michael to resign in protest. Michael opens the Michael Scott Paper Company in the same office building, enticing Pam and Ryan to join as salespeople, and though his business model is ultimately unsustainable, Dunder Mifflin's profits are immediately threatened. In a buyout of the Michael Scott Paper Company, the three are rehired with Pam promoted to sales and Ryan returning as a temp. During the chaos a new receptionist, Erin, is hired to fill the vacancy originally left by Pam. The season ends with a scene that subtly alludes to Pam's (unplanned) pregnancy.

=== Season 6 (2009–10) ===
The sixth season consists of 26 half-hours of material, divided into 22 half-hour episodes and two hour-long episodes.

Jim and Pam marry and have a baby named Cecelia Marie Halpert. Meanwhile, Andy and Erin develop an interest in each other, but find their inherent awkwardness inhibits his attempts to ask her out on a date during a murder-mystery game meant to distract the members of the office. Jim is promoted as co-manager. Rumors of bankruptcy begin to surround Dunder Mifflin, and by Christmas, Wallace announces to the branch that Dunder Mifflin has accepted a buyout from Sabre Corporation, a printer company. While Wallace and other executives are let go, the Scranton office survives due to its relative success within the company. Michael Scott is now the highest-level employee at Dunder Mifflin. In the season finale, Dwight buys the office park. Michael agrees to make an announcement to the press regarding a case of faulty printers. When Jo Bennett, Sabre CEO, asks how she can repay him, Michael responds that she could bring Holly back to the Scranton branch.

=== Season 7 (2010–11) ===
The seventh season consists of 26 half-hours of material, divided into 21 half-hour episodes, one "super-sized" episode, and two hour-long episodes.

This was the final season for Steve Carell, who plays Michael Scott. NBC did not renew Carell's contract. Beginning with this season, Zach Woods, who portrays Gabe Lewis, was promoted to a series regular. Erin and Gabe have begun a relationship, much to Andy's chagrin, and Andy attempts to win Erin's affection back. Holly, Michael's former girlfriend, returns to Scranton to fill in for Toby, who is on jury duty for the "Scranton Strangler" trial. Michael and Holly eventually restart their relationship. After the two get engaged, Michael reveals he will be leaving Scranton to move to Colorado with Holly to support her elderly parents. Jim and Pam adjust to parenthood, while Angela starts dating state senator Robert Lipton and gets engaged off-screen in the season finale. After Michael's replacement Deangelo (Will Ferrell) is seriously injured on the job, Jo creates a search committee to interview candidates and choose a new manager for the office. In the meantime, Dwight Schrute, and later Creed Bratton, take over as acting manager.

=== Season 8 (2011–12) ===
The eighth season consists of 24 episodes.

James Spader joins the cast as Robert California, the new CEO of Dunder Mifflin/Sabre. Andy is then promoted to regional manager and works hard to make a good impression on Robert, asking Dwight to be his number two. Pam and Jim are expecting their second child, Phillip, at the start of the season, to coincide with Fischer's real-life pregnancy. Angela is also pregnant with her first son, also named Philip, with State Senator Robert Lipton (although it is implied that Dwight is the child's biological father). Darryl starts falling for the new warehouse foreman, Val. Dwight is tasked with traveling to Tallahassee, Florida, to assist Sabre special projects manager Nellie Bertram (Catherine Tate) in launching a chain of retail stores, along with Jim, Ryan, Stanley, Erin, and new office temp Cathy Simms. Cathy is also revealed to have ulterior motives for the trip, as she intends to seduce Jim. Still, she fails. Robert later kills the retail store project, and Erin decides to stay in Florida as an elderly woman's live-in helper. Andy goes to Florida to win back Erin, allowing Nellie to claim the manager position as her own. Robert tells Andy that he has been demoted back to a salesman, but Andy refuses to accept the news, which causes him to be fired. Andy becomes motivated to begin a Dunder Mifflin comeback and joins with former CFO David Wallace, now a millionaire, to repurchase Dunder Mifflin from Sabre, putting Sabre completely out of business and giving Andy the manager position once again.

=== Season 9 (2012–13) ===
The final season consists of 25 episodes.

Andy, recently returning from Outward Bound manager training, reverts to his arrogant earlier season personality, abandoning both Erin and the office to travel around the Caribbean with his brother in their sailboat after his parents' relationship's demise. In his absence, Erin strikes up a romance with new customer service rep Pete, who, along with another new customer service rep Clark, replaces Kelly, leaving for Ohio with her new husband. (Ryan also moves to Ohio for "unrelated reasons.") Meanwhile, Jim receives an exciting opportunity from an old college friend who offers him a job at Athlead, a Philadelphia sports marketing company. Darryl also jumps on board, but the distance and dedication to Athlead hurts Jim's relationship with Pam. Angela must deal with her husband's infidelity with Oscar. She also deals with her lingering attraction to Dwight, who inherits his family's beet farm. Dwight receives more good news when David Wallace handpicks him to be the new manager after Andy quits to pursue an acting career, which quickly ends when he embarrasses himself at an American Idol-like a cappella singing competition that turns into a viral web sensation. Dwight later makes Jim his assistant to the regional manager, and the two officially end their grudge.

After Jim reconciles with Pam, choosing to stay in Scranton over Philadelphia, Dwight professes his love for Angela and finally marries her. In the series finale, which takes place one year after the release of the documentary that was shot during the entire series, the employees reunite for Dwight and Angela's wedding, for which Michael returns to serve as the best man (with help from Jim who was the person Dwight first asked to be best man). Kelly and Ryan run away together, Nellie now lives in Poland and "adopts" Ryan's abandoned baby, Erin meets her birth parents, Andy gets a job at Cornell, Stanley retires to Florida, Kevin and Toby are both fired—the former buying a bar, the latter moving to New York City to become an author, and Oscar runs for the State Senate. Jim and Pam, at her persuasion, move to Austin, Texas to open a new branch of Athleap (previously Athlead) with Darryl (Dwight "fires" them to give them both severance packages), and Creed is arrested for his many crimes.

== Product placement ==
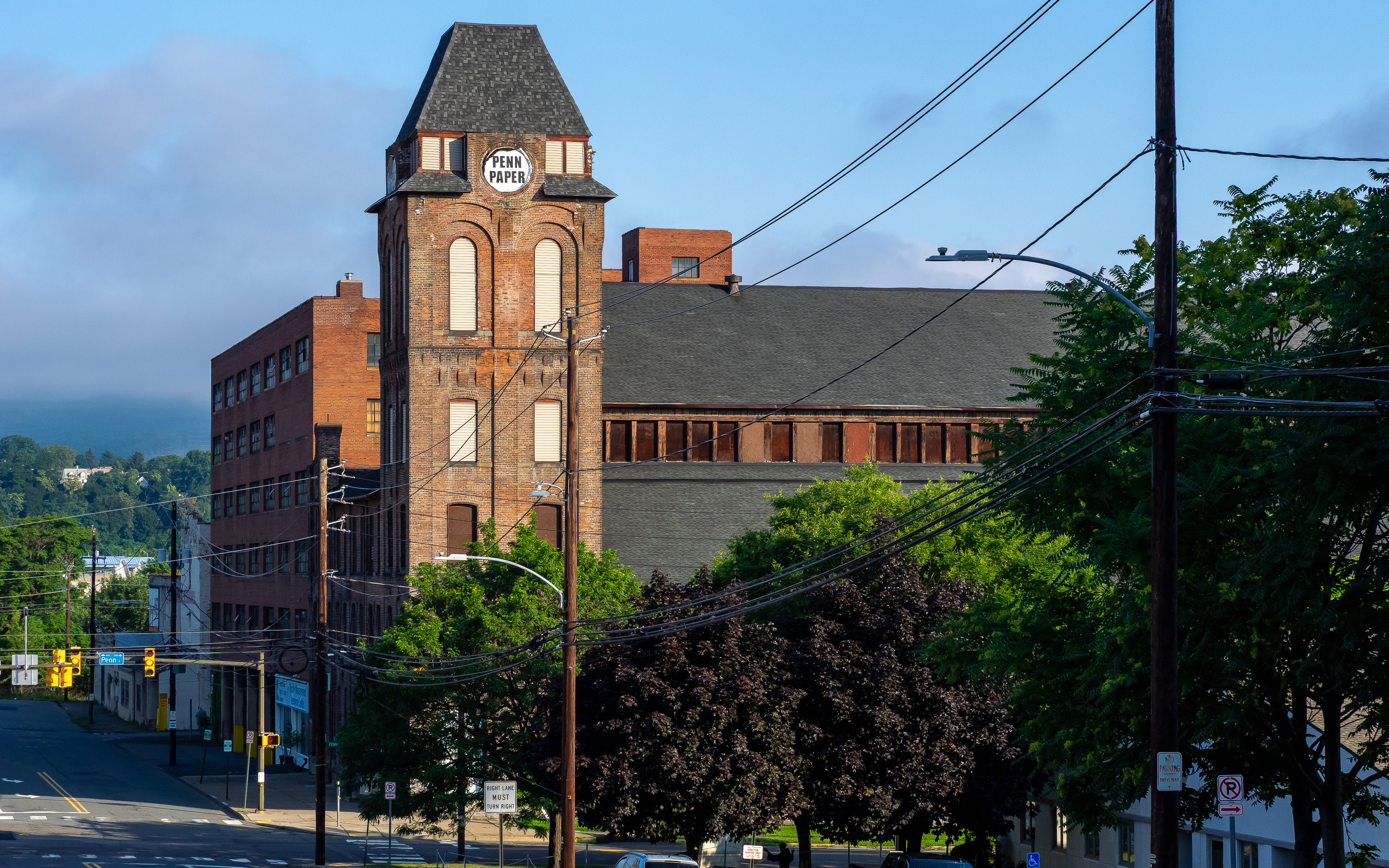
The Pennsylvania Paper & Supply Company tower, shown during the opening credits

The Office has had product placement deals with Staples and Olympic balers, as well as mentioning in dialogue or displaying clear logos for products such as Sandals Resorts, HP, Apple, and Gateway computers, and Activision's Call of Duty video game series. In certain versions of "The Merger", Kevin Malone uses a Staples-branded shredding machine to shred a Staples-branded CD-R and many other nonpaper items, including a salad. Cisco Systems, a supplier of networking and telephone equipment, paid for product placement, which can be seen on close-up shots of the Cisco IP telephones. Some products have additional branding labels attached; this can be clearly seen with the HP photo printer on Toby's desk in season 6, and less noticeably with the Cisco phones. In "The Secret" Michael takes Jim to Hooters to discuss Jim's feelings for Pam.

Many products featured are not part of product placement agreements but rather inserted by writers as products the characters would use to create realism under the guise of a documentary. Chili's restaurants were used for filming in "The Dundies" and "The Client", as the writers believed they were realistic choices for a company party and business lunch. Though not an explicit product placement, the producers of the show had to allow Chili's to have final approval of the script before filming, causing a scene of "The Dundies" to be hastily rewritten when the chain objected to the original version. Wegmans, a supermarket chain based out of Rochester, New York has had a working relationship with the show since the fall of 2007. Wegmans cereal, popcorn and cans of Wegmans soda have discreetly popped up in many episodes since then. Apple Inc. received over four minutes of publicity for the iPod when it was used as a much-desired gift in "Christmas Party", though the company did not pay for the placement. The travel website TripAdvisor was featured during Season 4 when after a visit to Dwight's "agritourism" bed and breakfast, Schrute Farms, Jim and Pam post an online review about their stay. The show reportedly approached the travel review website about using their name on the show and TripAdvisor set up a review page for the fictional B&B, which itself received hundreds of reviews. The appearance of Second Life in the episode "Local Ad" was rated eighth in the top ten most effective product placements of 2007.

== Reception and legacy ==
=== Critical reviews and commentary ===
Before the show aired, Ricky Gervais acknowledged that there were feelings of hesitation from certain viewers. The first season of The Office was met with a mixed response from critics, with some of them comparing it to the short-lived NBC series Coupling, which was also based on a British version. The New York Daily News called it "so diluted there's little left but muddy water," and USA Today called it a "passable imitation of a miles-better BBC original." A Guardian Unlimited review panned its lack of originality, stating that Steve Carell "just seems to be trying too hard... Maybe in later episodes, when it deviates from Gervais and Merchant's script, he'll come into his own. But right now he's a pale imitation." Tom Shales of The Washington Post said it was "not the mishmash that [the Americanized version of Coupling] turned out to be, but again the quality of the original show causes the remake to look dim, like when the copying machine is just about to give out."

"The Office has one of the best casts on television.... It also has created several compelling characters and touching relationships, all of which is fairly remarkable for a half-hour comedy."

— Travis Fickett of IGN in June 2007

The second season was better received. James Poniewozik of Time remarked, "Producer Greg Daniels created not a copy but an interpretation that sends up distinctly American work conventions ... with a tone that's more satiric and less mordant... The new boss is different from the old boss, and that's fine by me." He named it the second-best TV show of 2006 after Battlestar Galactica. Entertainment Weekly writer Mark Harris echoed these sentiments a week later, stating, "Thanks to the fearless Steve Carell, an ever-stronger supporting cast, and scripts that spew American corporate absurdist vernacular with perfect pitch, this undervalued remake does the near-impossible—it honors Ricky Gervais' original and works on its own terms." The A.V. Club reviewer Nathan Rabin expressed its views on the show's progression: "After a rocky start, The Office improved immeasurably, instantly becoming one of TV's funniest, sharpest shows. The casting of Steve Carell in the Gervais role proved to be a masterstroke. The American Office is that rarest of anomalies: a remake of a classic show that both does right by its source and carves out its own strong identity."

The series has been included on several top TV series lists. The show placed #61 on Entertainment Weekly's "New TV Classics" list. Time's James Poniewozik named it the second-best TV series of 2006, and the sixth-best returning series of 2007, out of ten TV series. He also included it on his "The 100 Best TV Shows of All-TIME" list. The show was also named the best show of 2006 by BuddyTV. while Paste named it the sixth-best sitcom of 2010. In 2013 the Writers Guild of America placed it at No. 66 on their list of 101 Best Written TV Series. In 2019, the series was ranked 32nd on The Guardian's list of the 100 best TV shows of the 21st century.

The show has some superficial similarities to the comic strip Dilbert, which also features employees coping with an inept superior. John Spector, CEO of The Conference Board, says that they both show the impact a leader can have, for good or bad. Dilbert creator Scott Adams also touts the similarities: "The lesson from The Office and from Dilbert is that people are often dysfunctional, and no amount of training can fix it." A labor-affiliated group, American Rights at Work (ARAW), praised the second-season episode "Boys and Girls" for what it considered an unusually frank depiction of union busting on American television. Metacritic, a review aggregation website, graded only the first, third, sixth, and final seasons; however, it denoted that all four of them received "generally favorable reviews" from critics, awarding a 61, 85, 78, and 64 score—out of 100—to each of them, respectively. It later named it the thirteenth most mentioned series on "Best of Decade" top-ten lists.

"The Office now is a pale, listless shadow of what it used to be."

— Alan Sepinwall of HitFix in September 2011, during the show's eighth season.

The last few seasons were criticized for a dip in quality. The sixth season received criticisms for a lack of stakes for the characters, particularly Jim and Pam. The Office co-creator Ricky Gervais wrote in his blog, referring to "Search Committee," particularly Warren Buffett's guest appearance, "If you're going to jump a shark, jump a big one," and compared the episode to the Chris Martin episode of Gervais' other series, Extras (although he later said on his website, "I fucking didn't [diss The Office], that's for sure"). Some critics said the series should have ended after the departure of Steve Carell. In an IAmA interview on Reddit, Rainn Wilson felt that the eighth season possessed some mistakes "creatively," such as the chemistry between Spader and Helms, which he called "a bit dark" and argued that the show should have gone for a "brighter and more energized" relationship. Despite this, there are later-series episodes that have received critical acclaim, including "Niagara", "Garage Sale", "Goodbye, Michael", "Dwight Christmas", "A.A.R.M.", and "Finale".

Rotten Tomatoes critical response
Season	Percentage	Rating	Critical consensus
1	71% (41 reviews)	7.8/10	"The Office quickly distinguishes itself from its source material within the first few episodes, proving not all Hollywood remakes of overseas hits are destined to end in failure. (That's what she said.)"
2	100% (14 reviews)	8.4/10	"The Office undergoes a steep improvement in its sophomore season, course correcting the series' bitter dynamics with a dose of warmth that makes the sour jokes all the sweeter."
3	100% (13 reviews)	8.4/10	"The Office hits its full stride in a raucous and romantic third season that gives the series' deep ensemble a generous raise in character development."
4	83% (12 reviews)	7.7/10	"Dunder Mifflin makes some awkward choices while adjusting to a world without Jim and Pam's will-they-won't-they sparks, but The Office remains a winning ode to workplace drudgery."
5	100% (16 reviews)	8.3/10	"The Office continues to power on like a trusty Xerox machine in a fifth season that has perfected the series' formula for balancing misery with sweetness."
6	73% (15 reviews)	7.3/10	"The Office maintains its quality while highlighting major life changes and mundane happenings among the ensemble cast – and continuing to set a new standard for the workplace sitcom genre."
7	83% (24 reviews)	7.8/10	"While it struggles to answer how Dunder Mifflin will continue to thrive without Steve Carell's terrific performance, The Office sends off his Michael Scott in heartfelt fashion."
8	44% (25 reviews)	6.3/10	"The Office spends its eighth season in the midst of an identity crisis as characters leave and reappear, but at least Robert California is gone."
9	79% (43 reviews)	7.2/10	"The Office's final season returns the series to fine form, balancing the funny with the heartfelt and reminding viewers what made the show great."

=== Awards ===
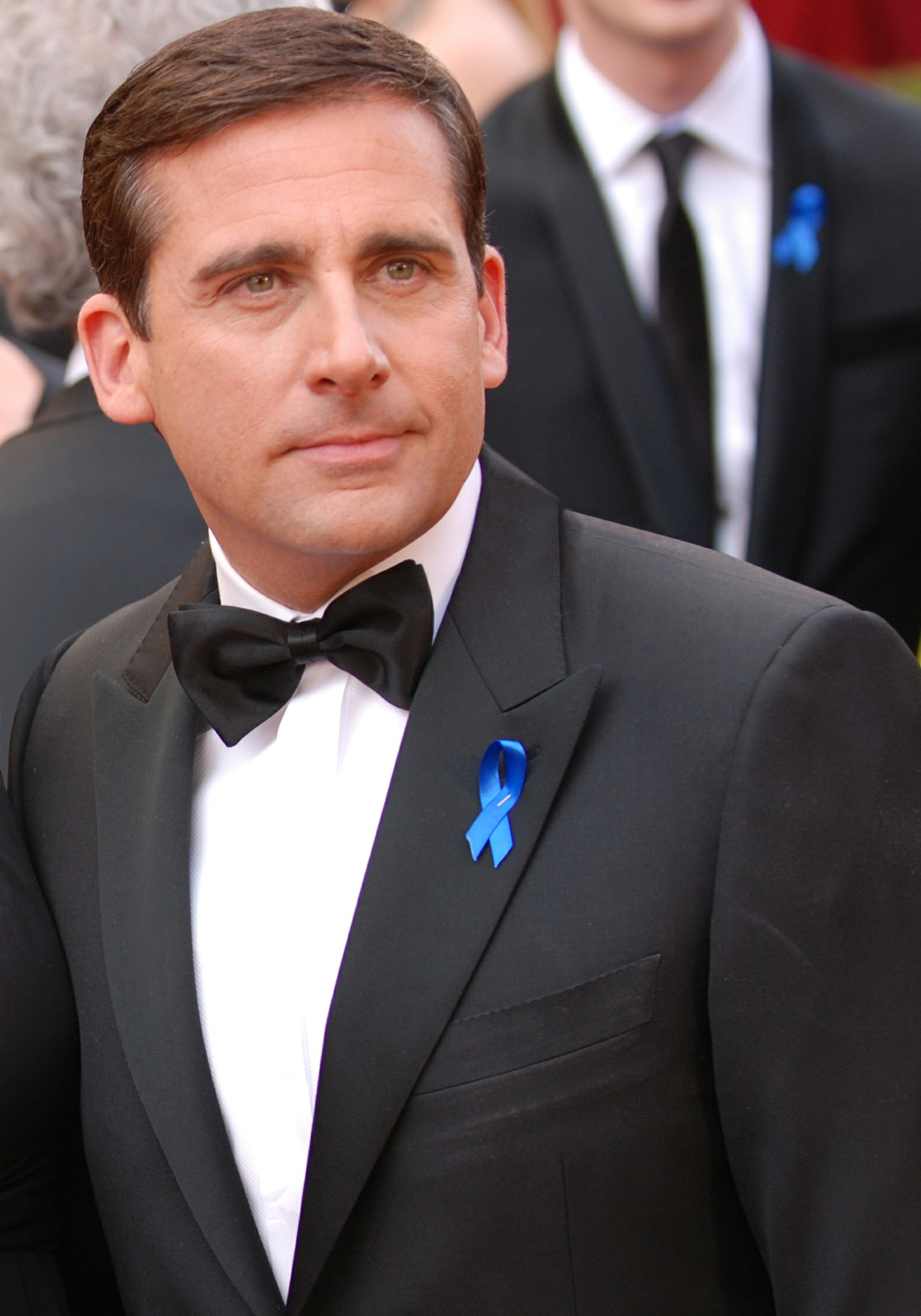
Steve Carell was nominated for six Emmys for his role as Michael Scott.

The series received 42 Primetime Emmy Awards nominations, with five wins. It won for Outstanding Comedy Series in season two, Outstanding Writing for a Comedy Series (Greg Daniels for "Gay Witch Hunt"), Outstanding Directing for a Comedy Series (Jeffrey Blitz for "Stress Relief"), and Outstanding Single-Camera Picture Editing for a Comedy Series (David Rogers and Claire Scanlon for "Finale"). Many cast and crew members have expressed anger that Carell did not receive an Emmy award for his performance in the series. Despite this, Carell won a Golden Globe Award for Best Actor in a Television Comedy or Musical in 2006. The series was also named the best TV series by the American Film Institute in 2006 and 2008, won two Screen Actors Guild Awards for Outstanding Performance by an Ensemble in a Comedy Series in 2006 and 2007 and won a Peabody Award in 2006.

=== Ratings ===
Premiering on Thursday, March 24, 2005, with a "preview" episode, after an episode of The Apprentice on NBC, The Office brought in 11.2 million viewers in the U.S., winning its time slot. When NBC moved the series to its intended Tuesday night slot for its official series premiere, it lost nearly half its audience with only 5.9 million viewers. The program averaged 5.4 million viewers, ranking it #102 for the 2004–05 U.S. television season. "Hot Girl," the first season's finale, rated a 2.2 with a 10 audience measurement share. Episodes were also rerun on CNBC on April 1 and April 24, 2005.

As the second season started, the success of Carell's hit summer movie The 40-Year-Old Virgin and online sales of episodes at iTunes helped the show. The increase in viewership led NBC to move the series to the "Must See TV" Thursday night in January 2006, where ratings continued to grow. By the 2005–06 season, it placed #67 (tied with 20/20). It averaged 8 million viewers with a 4.0/10 rating/share among viewers ages 18–49, and was up 80% in viewers from the year before and up 60% in viewers ages 18–49. The series ranked as NBC's highest rated scripted series during its run. The highest rated episode of the series was "Stress Relief," which was watched by 22.9 million viewers. This episode was aired right after Super Bowl XLIII. While later seasons dropped in the ratings, the show was still one of NBC's highest rated shows, and in October 2011 it was reported that it cost $178,840 per 30-second commercial, the most for any NBC scripted series. The series was also the most streamed of 2020, with 57 billion minutes watched in the United States.

==== Nielsen ratings ====
Viewership and ratings per season of The Office
Season	Timeslot (ET)	Episodes	First aired		Last aired		TV season	Viewership rank	Avg. viewers (millions)	18–49 rank	Avg. 18–49 rating
Season	Timeslot (ET)	Episodes	Date	Viewers (millions)	Date	Viewers (millions)	TV season	Viewership rank	Avg. viewers (millions)	18–49 rank	Avg. 18–49 rating
1	Thursday 9:30 pm (1); Tuesday 9:30 pm (2–6)	6	March 24, 2005	11.23	April 26, 2005	4.83	2004–05	102	5.40	82	2.5/6
2	Tuesday 9:30 pm (1–10); Thursday 9:30 pm (11–22)	22	September 20, 2005	9.00	May 11, 2006	7.66	2005–06	67	8.0	34	4.0/10
3	Thursday 8:30 pm	25	September 21, 2006	9.11	May 17, 2007	7.88	2006–07	68	8.30	28	4.1/11
4	Thursday 9:00 pm	19	September 27, 2007	9.65	May 15, 2008	8.21	2007–08	77	8.04	77	2.8
5	Thursday 9:00 pm	28	September 25, 2008	9.34	May 14, 2009	6.77	2008–09	52	9.04	52	3.1
6	Thursday 9:00 pm	26	September 17, 2009	8.21	May 20, 2010	6.64	2009–10	41	8.73	11	4.5/11
7	Thursday 9:00 pm	26	September 23, 2010	8.48	May 19, 2011	7.29	2010–11	53	7.73	11	4.0/10
8	Thursday 9:00 pm	24	September 22, 2011	7.64	May 10, 2012	4.49	2011–12	78	6.51	29	3.4/9
9	Thursday 9:00 pm	25	September 20, 2012	4.28	May 16, 2013	5.69	2012–13	88	5.06	41	2.6/7

=== Cultural impact ===
The city of Scranton, long known mainly for its industrial past as a coal mining and rail center, has embraced, and ultimately has been redefined by the show. "We're really hip now", said the mayor's assistant. The Dunder Mifflin logo is on a lamppost banner in front of Scranton City Hall, as well as the pedestrian bridge to The Mall at Steamtown. In 2007, the Pennsylvania Paper & Supply Company, whose tower is shown in the opening credits, planned to add it to the tower as well. Newspapers in other Northeastern cities have published travel guides to Scranton locations for tourists interested in visiting places mentioned in the show. Scranton has become identified with the show outside the United States as well. In a 2008 St. Patrick's Day speech in its suburb of Dickson City, former Taoiseach (the Irish Head of Government) Bertie Ahern identified the city as the home of Dunder Mifflin.

The inaugural The Office convention was held downtown in October 2007. Landmarks, some of which have been settings for the show, that served as venues include the University of Scranton, the Radisson Lackawanna Station Hotel and the Mall at Steamtown. Cast appearances were made by B. J. Novak, Ed Helms, Oscar Nunez, Angela Kinsey, Brian Baumgartner, Leslie David Baker, Mindy Kaling, Craig Robinson, Melora Hardin, Phyllis Smith, Creed Bratton, Kate Flannery, Bobby Ray Shafer, and Andy Buckley. Besides Novak and Kaling, writer appearances were made by Greg Daniels, Michael Schur, Jennifer Celotta, Lee Eisenberg, Gene Stupnitsky, Justin Spitzer, Anthony Ferrell, Ryan Koh, Lester Lewis, and Jason Kessler. Not present were writer-actor Paul Lieberstein (who was originally going to make an appearance), Steve Carell, John Krasinski, Rainn Wilson, and Jenna Fischer.

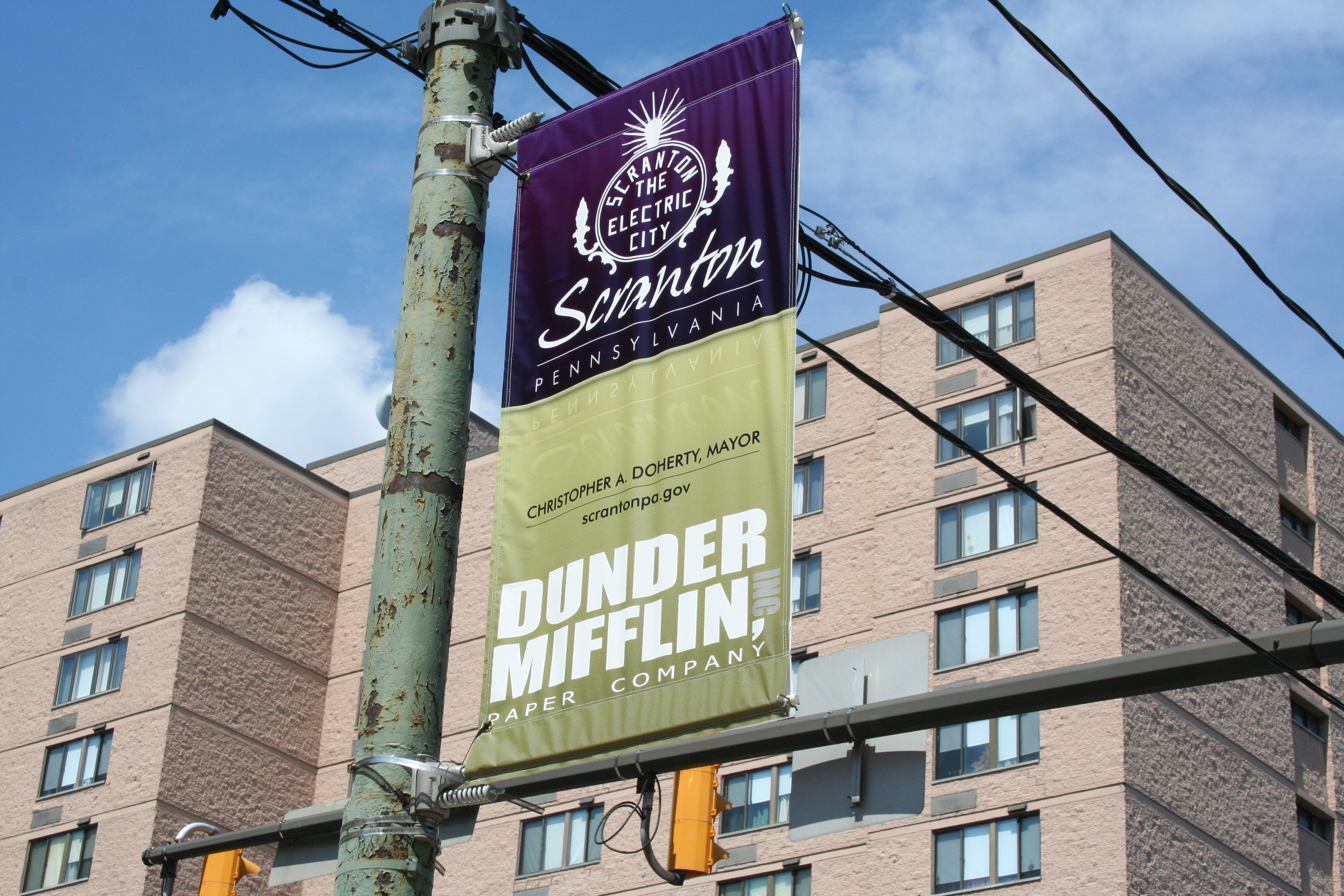
Dunder Mifflin banner in front of Scranton City Hall

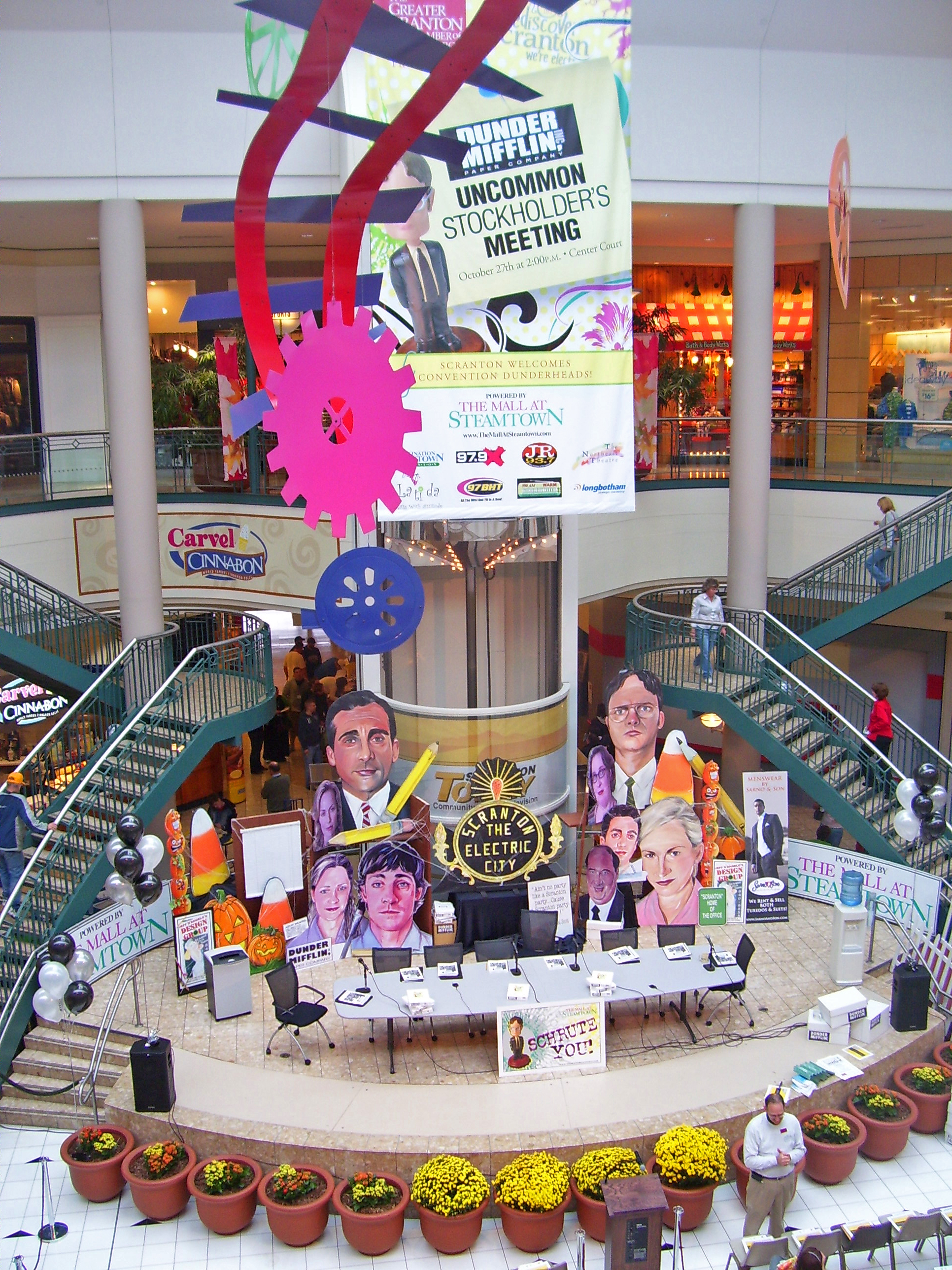
Atrium of the Mall at Steamtown during the inaugural The Office convention

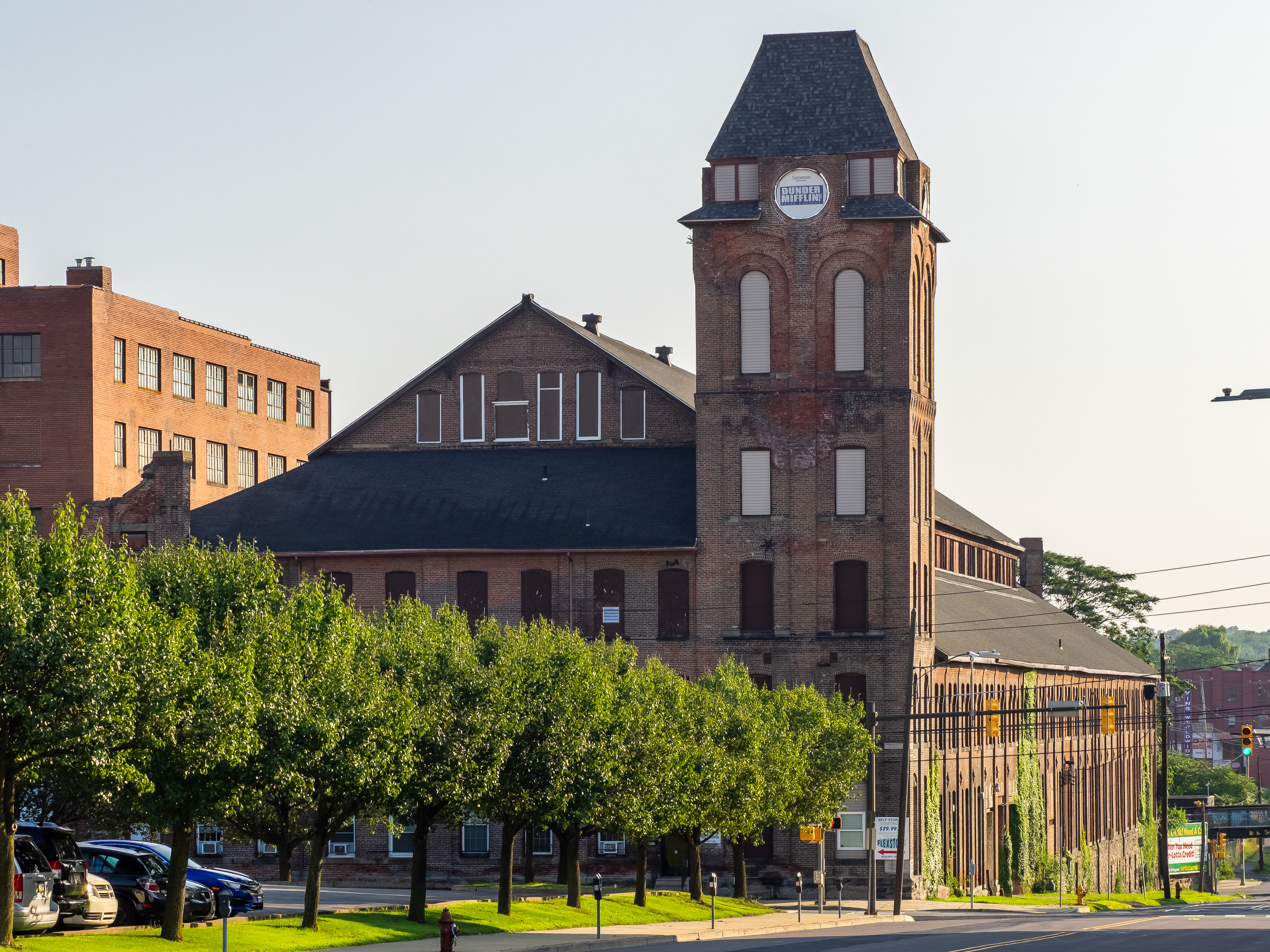
Dunder Mifflin Logo added to the Penn Paper Building in Scranton

On an episode of The Daily Show, Republican presidential candidate John McCain, reportedly a devoted fan of the show, jokingly told Jon Stewart he might take Dwight Schrute as his running mate. Rainn Wilson later accepted on Dwight Schrute's behalf while on The Tonight Show with Jay Leno. After the airing of "Garage Sale", where the character of Michael Scott decides to move to Colorado, Colorado governor John Hickenlooper issued a press release appointing Scott to the position of director of paper distribution in the Department of Natural Resources.

The show is often paid tribute by the band Relient K. Frontman Matt Thiessen is a fan of The Office, and during concerts will often perform a self-described "love song" about the series, titled "The Ballad of Dunder Mifflin", followed by him and the band playing the show's opening theme.

A parody musical, titled The Office! A Musical Parody, written by Bob McSmith, Tobly McSmith, and Assaf Gleizner, began performances at The Jerry Orbach Theatre on September 24, 2018, with an official opening on October 3, 2018. The show temporarily closed due to the COVID-19 pandemic, and resumed performances on April 9, 2021, becoming the first New York City stage musical to reopen following the pandemic. Cast members Jenna Fischer and Angela Kinsey attended a performance in May 2022.

Multiple scenes from The Office have served as the basis for Internet memes. Examples include a meme based on Michael exclaiming "No, God! No, God, please, no! No! No! Noooo—" upon seeing Toby in the season 5 episode "Frame Toby" and a meme called "They're the same picture" based on a quote by Pam in the season 7 finale "Search Committee".

== Other media ==
=== Online releases ===
NBC webcast the "Diversity Day" episode on March 16, 2005, on MySpace to promote the show's then-upcoming premiere, days before the TV broadcasts began. This was NBC's first-ever online debut of a complete episode of a network series, and also included a trimmed-down webisode version of the episode for on-demand viewing on MySpace the following day. Episodes from The Office were among the first shows available for download from the iTunes Store and for free streaming on NBC.com beginning in December 2005. In 2006, ten internet-exclusive webisodes featuring some of the characters on The Office aired on NBC.com. "Producer's Cuts" (containing approximately ten additional minutes of material) of the episodes "Branch Closing" and "The Return" were also made available on NBC.com. The Office also became available for download from Amazon.com's Unbox video downloads in 2006. Sales of new The Office episodes on iTunes ceased in 2007 due to a dispute between NBC and Apple ostensibly overpricing. As of September 9, 2008, The Office was put back on the iTunes Store and can be bought in HD and SD format. It is also available through all other major digital distribution sales platforms.

Netflix also offered the show for online viewing by subscribers, in addition to traditional DVD rental. The series would become one of the most streamed shows on Netflix, with its availability on a streamer leading to the show's sustained popularity. The Office left Netflix in the United States on December 31, 2020, as NBCUniversal acquired the rights to the show for its streaming service Peacock, which joined the following day. Exclusive to Peacock are extended episodes which include deleted scenes and additional footage. The first five seasons previously stream for free but now are premium only, and seasons 6–9 are available to stream on its premium tier.

When the show was in production, it was noted for its large amount of delayed viewing. Of the 12.4 million total viewings of "Fun Run," the fourth season's premiere, 2.7 million, or 22%, were on a computer via online streaming. "The Office," said The New York Times, "is on the leading edge of a sharp shift in entertainment viewing that was thought to be years away: watching television episodes on a computer screen is now a common activity for millions of consumers." It was particularly popular with online viewers, an NBC researcher said, because as an episode-driven sitcom without special effects it was easy to watch on smaller monitors such as those found on laptops and iPods. Between the online viewings and those who use digital video recorders, 25–50% of the show's viewers watched it after its scheduled airtime.

The show's Internet success became an issue in the 2007–2008 Writers Guild of America strike. Daniels and many of the cast members who double as writers posted a video to YouTube shortly after the strike began, pointing out how little if any, they received in residuals from online and DVD viewing. "You're watching this on the Internet, a thing that pays us zero dollars," Schur said. "We're supposed to get 11 cents for every two trillion downloads." The writers were particularly upset that they weren't compensated for the Daytime Emmy Award-winning summer webisodes "The Accountants", which NBC considered promotional material despite the embedded commercials.

=== Other broadcasts ===
Aside from NBC, The Office has gone into syndication in the United States. It previously ran on local broadcast stations in off-network syndication. Its initial cable subdivision was on TBS, which currently is one of the many networks airing it as of April 2026. On December 13, 2017, Comedy Central announced that they had acquired all nine seasons of the show from NBCUniversal in a non-exclusive deal, and some episodes are available to stream on Comedy Central's official website and mobile app on a rotating basis. Reruns of The Office began airing on Comedy Central on January 15, 2018. The deal between Viacom (who owns Comedy Central) and NBCUniversal (for rights for airing reruns of The Office) was extended throughout 2021. The series airs in a non-exclusive window on Paramount Media Networks and previously aired on its sister diginet Fave TV through 2025. The series aired on Cozi TV from January 1, 2019, to October 3, 2021. It also aired on Nick at Nite starting January 1, 2019, and later on Paramount Network, although Nick at Nite no longer airs the program as of May 5, 2019. The show then began airing on Freeform on January 1, 2022. In the United Kingdom, the show was named in listings magazines (but not onscreen) as The Office: An American Workplace when it originally aired there on BBC Three before moving to ITV2. In Australia, all 9 seasons aired on 10 Shake.

=== Promotional ===
The show's success has resulted in expansion outside of television. Characters have appeared in promotional materials for NBC, and a licensed video game—The Office—was released on November 28, 2007, by MumboJumbo from the development company Reveille. In 2008 two games were introduced via Pressman Toy Corp: The Office Trivia Board Game and The Office DVD Board Game. In 2009, The Office Clue was released, and The Office Monopoly was released in 2010. Other merchandise, from T-shirts and a bobblehead doll of Dwight Schrute to more office-specific items such as Dunder Mifflin copy paper and parodies of the Successories motivational poster series featuring the cast are available. Dunder Mifflin had two websites, and the cast members maintained blogs both as themselves and in character.

In April 2024, cast members Rainn Wilson, Craig Robinson, Jenna Fischer, Kate Flannery, Brian Baumgartner, and Creed Bratton appeared in an AT&T commercial for the company's AT&T Business Next Level Network.

=== Cast blogs ===
Several members of the cast maintained blogs on MySpace, including Jenna Fischer, Angela Kinsey, and Brian Baumgartner, who posted regularly during the season. Rainn Wilson wrote in character as Dwight for the "Schrute Space" blog on NBC.com, which was updated periodically; however, he stopped writing the blog himself. It is unknown whether Creed Bratton authors "Creed Thoughts," the blog attributed to his character.

=== Cast podcast ===
On September 11, 2019, Jenna Fischer and Angela Kinsey announced their podcast called Office Ladies which premiered on October 16, 2019, on Earwolf. The podcast features Fischer and Kinsey watching episodes of The Office and offering behind-the-scenes details and answering fan questions. The theme song for the podcast, "Rubber Tree" is performed by Creed Bratton.

In February 2021, Brian Baumgartner started a podcast called The Office Deep Dive with Brian Baumgartner in which he sits down with other actors, writers, and others who worked on the show and share behind-the-scenes stories about the show. The podcast introduction song, "Bubble and Squeek", is also performed by Creed Bratton.

=== Home media ===
Season	Region 1 release date	Region 2 release date	Region 4 release date	Episodes	Discs	Bonus features
1	August 16, 2005	April 10, 2006	August 16, 2006	6	1	Deleted scenes from all episodes, five commentary tracks by cast and crew on select episodes.
2	September 12, 2006	January 28, 2008	April 4, 2007	22	4	Deleted scenes from every episode, ten commentary tracks by cast and crew on select episodes, The Accountants webisodes, Faces of Scranton video, blooper reel, 17 fake public service announcements, Olympics promos and "Steve on Steve" promos.
3	September 4, 2007	July 21, 2008	August 20, 2008 (Part 1); April 22, 2009 (Part 2)	25	4	Deleted scenes, eight commentary tracks by cast and crew on select episodes, "Kevin Cooks Stuff in The Office", 2006 NBC Primetime Preview, Toby wraparound promos, Dwight Schrute music video, Joss Whedon interview, blooper reel, Lazy Scranton video, and a 58th Annual Emmy Awards excerpt. A special edition for Target called the "Nifty Gifty" set also contains footage from the Museum of TV festival and script facsimile.
4	September 2, 2008	June 14, 2010	September 2, 2009 (Part 1); December 2, 2009 (Part 2)	19	4	Deleted scenes, outtakes, Second Life footage, The Office Convention invitation, The Office Convention: Writer's Block Panel, "Goodbye, Toby" music video, four commentary tracks by cast and crew on select episodes.
5	September 8, 2009	February 7, 2011	September 29, 2010 (Part 1); March 2, 2011 (Part 2)	28	5	Deleted scenes, outtakes, ten commentaries by the cast and crew, "The Academy of Art and Sciences presents, 'The Office,' Summer Olympic promos, Super Bowl promos, Kevin's Loan webisodes, and The Outburst webisodes.
6	September 7, 2010	January 30, 2012	August 4, 2011 (Part 1); November 9, 2011 (Part 2)	26	5	Deleted scenes, outtakes, gag reel, cast and crew commentaries, two extended episodes, minisode The Podcast, "Welcome to Sabre" corporate welcome video, promos.
Overtime	November 16, 2010	N/A	N/A	N/A	1	The Accountants, Kevin's Loan, The Outburst, Blackmail, Subtle Sexuality and The Mentor webisodes, The Podcast minisode, The Office Convention: Cast Q&A, Paley: Inside The Writer's Room, Subtle Sexuality commentary with Mindy Kaling, B. J. Novak, and Ellie Kemper, Blackmail video commentary with Creed Bratton, Subtle Sexuality music video, Dwight Schrute music video, Lazy Scranton video, Michael Scott's Dunder Mifflin ad and fake PSAs.
7	September 6, 2011	September 3, 2012	August 22, 2012 (Part 1); November 7, 2012 (Part 2)	26	5	Deleted scenes, blooper reel, "The Third Floor" webisodes, cast and crew commentaries on five episodes, producer's extended cuts of "Training Day" and "Search Committee," Threat Level Midnight: The Movie (A Michael Scott Joint)
8	September 4, 2012	April 7, 2014	February 13, 2013 (Part 1); August 8, 2013 (Part 2)	24	5	Deleted scenes, blooper reel, "The Girl Next Door" webisodes, producer's extended cuts of "Angry Andy" and "Fundraiser"
9	September 3, 2013	September 15, 2014	February 13, 2014 (Part 1); June 19, 2014 (Part 2)	25	5	Deleted scenes, gag reel, rare audition footage

The complete series of The Office was released on Blu-ray from Universal Pictures Home Entertainment on November 10, 2020. The Office: The Complete Series – Superfan Extended Episodes Blu-ray was released on July 14, 2026. The set includes every episode with its deleted scenes edited in by original editor David Rogers, and in total includes 25 hours of deleted scenes. These versions of the episodes were previously exclusively available on Peacock.

== Spin-offs ==
=== Potential ideas ===
A spin-off to the series was proposed in 2008, with a pilot episode expected to debut as the Super Bowl lead-out program in 2009. The idea created by the writers was that a copy machine breaks in The Office and then it is recalled, fixed, and shipped to Pawnee, Indiana, the setting of Parks and Recreation. However, The Office's creative team instead decided to develop Parks and Recreation as a separate series. Also, actress Rashida Jones was to portray a different character in both, causing a problem for the potential spin-off.

Another spin-off starring Rainn Wilson as Dwight Schrute running a bed-and-breakfast and beet farm, titled The Farm, was proposed in early 2012. In October 2012, however, NBC decided not to go forward with the series. A backdoor pilot episode was produced, and although the show was not picked up, it was modified and aired during the ninth season as "The Farm".

In September 2019, with the announcement of NBCUniversal's streaming service Peacock, Bonnie Hammer, Chairman of Direct-to-Consumer and Digital Enterprises at NBCU stated that it is her "hope and goal that we do an Office reboot". In March 2020, former showrunner Greg Daniels expressed doubts about a reboot being possible, and later that year, former NBC president of original content Bill McGoldrick stated that "a reboot has not come up specifically for Peacock". A reboot of the series was revealed to be in development in September 2023, with Greg Daniels returning as a showrunner. In November 2023, Daniels clarified that he had no interest in rebooting the series by redoing "that same show with a different cast", instead preferring to have a spinoff series focusing on a different subject in the same world.

In July 2020, Leslie David Baker launched a Kickstarter campaign to fund the production of a pilot for Uncle Stan, a proposed spin-off focusing on a now-engaged Stanley Hudson as "[a]fter several years of enjoying a relatively uneventful retirement lifestyle, Uncle Stan receives an urgent call for help from his favorite nephew, Lucky: a recent widower with two small children and a motorcycle repair/flower shop in Los Angeles. Soon Uncle Stan finds himself dishing out all the support and guidance he has to offer in his new California home." As a result of the COVID-19 pandemic, plans for the spinoff were put "on hold", and later cancelled, with Leslie David Baker announcing that backers would be refunded.

=== The Paper ===
In May 2024, Peacock announced a series order for the untitled follow-up series, which centers around the documentary crew from the original series finding a new subject in a dying Midwestern historic newspaper and the publisher trying to revive it with volunteer reporters. The follow-up has Daniels, Michael Koman, Howard Klein, Ben Silverman, Banijay Americas and the creatives behind the original British series (Ricky Gervais and Stephen Merchant) as executive producers. The series stars Domhnall Gleeson, Sabrina Impacciatore, Chelsea Frei, Melvin Gregg, Gbemisola Ikumelo, Alex Edelman, Ramona Young, Tim Key, and Oscar Nunez reprising his role from The Office. It debuted on September 4, 2025, on Peacock. The series has been renewed for a second season.
