= Jumper =

Jumper or Jumpers may refer to:

== Clothing ==
- Sweater, a long-sleeve article of clothing; also called a top, pullover, or jumper in British.
  - A waist-length top garment of dense wool, part of the Royal Navy uniform and the uniform of the United States Navy
  - In Australian English, a sporting jersey or guernsey
- Jumper (dress) (U.S. English; known elsewhere as a pinafore dress), a sleeveless dress intended to be worn over a top or blouse
- Jumpsuit, a one-piece outfit

== People ==
- Betty Mae Tiger Jumper (1923–2011), first female chief of the Seminole Tribe of Florida
- Hunter Jumper (born 1989), American soccer player
- John Jumper (Seminole chief) (1820–1896), principal chief of the Seminoles from 1849 to 1865
- John P. Jumper (born 1945), former Chief of Staff of the United States Air Force
- William Jumper (1660–1715), Royal Navy officer
- Jimmy J. Jumper (1923–1979), Airforce Major General and father of General John P. Jumper

== Arts, media, and entertainment ==
- Jumper (novel), a novel by Steven Gould
  - Jumper (2008 film), a 2008 film adaptation of the novel
  - Jumper: Griffin's Story (video game), a video game based on the film
  - Jumper: Griffin's Story (novel), a novel based on the film
- Jumper (1991 film), a pornographic film
- Jumpers (play), a play by Tom Stoppard
- "Jumpers", an episode of the television series Zoboomafoo
- Jumper (short story), a short story by Stephen King
- "Jumper", a 2026 Indian Hindi-language crime thriller drama film directed by Saurabh Varma.

=== Music ===
- Jumper (band), a Swedish pop group 1996–2001
- "Jumper" (Third Eye Blind song), 1998
- "Jumper" (Hardwell and W&W song), 2013
- "Jumper", by Capsule from More! More! More!, 2008
- "Jumper", by Cravity from Hideout: Remember Who We Are – Season 1, 2020
- "Jumper", by Rudimental from Ground Control, 2021
- "Jumpers", by Sleater-Kinney from The Woods, 2005

== Computers and software ==
- Jumper (computing), an electrical connector
- Jumper 2.0, open source collaborative enterprise search software

== Electronics ==
- Jumper (BEAM), in BEAM robotics, a robot that moves by jumping
- Jump wire (also known as jumper, jumper wire, jumper cable, DuPont wire or cable)

== Religious groups ==
- Jumpers, members of the Welsh Methodist Revival

== Sports ==
- Jump shot (basketball)
- Show jumper, a type of equestrian competition, or the horses that compete in same
- Jumper, a person who participates in parachuting

== Other meanings ==
- Jumper (person), a person who commits suicide by jumping from a height
- Jumper ant, venomous ant of Australian temperate regions
- Citroën Jumper, a French van
- IAI JUMPER, a self-contained missile launcher system
- A common name for jumping spiders

== See also ==
- Jumper cable (disambiguation)
- Jumpertown, Mississippi, a town in the United States
