= Exo (novel) =

Novel by Steven Gould

- Author: Steven Gould
- Cover artist: Getty Images
- Language: English
- Series: Jumper
- Genre: Science fiction novel
- Publisher: Tor Books
- Publication date: September 9, 2014
- Publication place: United States
- Media type: Print (hardcover) e-Book (Kindle); Audio Book (CD)
- Pages: 464 pp (Hardcover)
- ISBN: 978-0-7653-3654-5
- Preceded by: Impulse novel
- Followed by: Impulse television series

Exo is the fifth and last novel in the Jumper series by Steven Gould and the fifth in the Jumper universe. The first two novels—Jumper and Reflex—tell a connecting story of David and Millie, which is continued with their daughter, Cent, in Impulse and now Exo; while the third novel, Jumper: Griffin's Story, is the back-story for a character from the 2008 movie Jumper and is not associated with the story or characters in the novels.

== Plot ==
The main protagonist is Millicent (Cent) Rice, teenaged daughter of David (Davy) Rice and his wife Millicent (Millie) Harrison-Rice. Having learned in the previous novel that she can use jumping to modify her velocity, Cent experiments with heading toward space. She contacts Cory Matoska, a researcher who has made a lightweight space suit that is much more practical than existing models, with the one problem that because it is a single piece of fabric up to the neck gasket, no human can actually try it out — except Cent and her family, because of their ability to jump in and out of it.

After arguing with her parents, Cent sets Cory up with a lab of his own on the condition that she gets access to the suit. At first he thinks that she is planning for years in the future, but then she reveals the fact that she can get into the suit easily, and wants to test it out within weeks.

Millie's mother is very ill, and in a nursing home. When she takes a turn for the worse, Davy, Millie and Cent go to great lengths to set her up at their lodge home in the north of Canada.

Cent makes it to low Earth orbit without incident. She finds that she can navigate in space easily, either by jumping simply based on coordinates, or by visualizing changes to the Earth's position or relative motion. She makes friends with a research team whose experimental satellite has failed to deploy properly by retrieving it for them. When the satellite is confiscated, she deploys the back-up in its place. Cent starts advertising her services, offering to deliver anything less than about 50 kilograms to any orbit, LEO to GEO, equatorial to polar, for a thousand dollars per kilogram, and promises to remove a kilogram of space junk for every kilogram she takes up.

Cent's activities are discovered by the government through her use of satellite phones. After some wrangling, she ends up unofficially sanctioned, and works with the government to properly document her deliveries. Later, the government calls her because one of the cosmonauts at the International Space Station is having a medical emergency. She delivers him safely to an Earth-bound hospital, to great acclaim.

The hostile group that has been hunting Davy and his family locates the home in Canada and blows it up, but everyone is safely evacuated just in time. Cent had already begun plans for a space station of her own. Those plans accelerate when Millie's mother takes a turn for the worse, and the family realizes that living in space would be the perfect treatment. Cent and Davy work together to implement a modest space station, consisting of two concentric spherical balloons with straw-filled water/ice between them. They successfully move Millie's mother to the station, and she improves.

The station needs regular resupply for almost everything. While on a run to get oxygen tanks, Cent is captured by the organization that has been hunting her family for years. They imprison her in a pressure chamber, with her boyfriend Joe nearby. If she tries to flood the chamber the way Davy did to escape previously, not only won't the pressure chamber give way, but Joe will drown. Cent realizes that the chamber is only built to withstand pressure from the inside, and twins to outer space, immediately evacuating the chamber and destroying it. Hyacinth Pope tries to knife Cent, and gets blown into orbit where she dies.

== Characters ==
- David Rice – Has the ability to "jump" instantaneously to any location that he can visualize accurately. He has always encouraged his daughter's love of space and science.
- Millie Harrison-Rice – David's wife. Shares her husband's ability. She spends much of her time taking care of her aging mother.
- Millicent "Cent" Rice – Named after her mother, Cent is the 17-year-old daughter of Davy and Millie. Cent takes her love of science to a whole new level as she plans (and executes) her own space program which she calls Apex Orbital.
- Samantha Harrison – Cent's grandmother (Millie's mother). She has broken her hip again and is not recovering well, therefore the Harrison-Rice family moves her into their home and make every effort to take care of her and hopefully help her recover effectively.
- Tara Bochinclonny – Together with Jade, Tara is one of Cent's best friends. Tara has a knack for marketing and becomes Apex Orbital's public relations director.
- Jade Chilton – Jade is the daughter of somewhat wealthy parents. She is in a relationship with Tara and together the two of them are Cent's best friends. Jade is going to Smith College for graphic design and does most of the design work for Apex Orbital.
- Joe Trujeque – Joe is a Stanford University student and Cent's boyfriend... sorta. The last they saw of each other Cent had caught him in bed with his "study partner". Eventually he begins working with the others on the Apex Orbital project, mainly out of necessity for more help that already knows Cent's secrets.
- Cory Matoska – Named after a real person, Dr. Matoska is the inventor of the MCP (Mechanical Counter-Pressure) suit and primary partner/adviser of Cent in her efforts to create Apex Orbital.
