= Jumper cable (disambiguation) =

Jumper cables are electric cables to connect two rail or road vehicles.

Jumper cable may also refer to:

- Jump wire, a short electrical wire with a solid tip at each end used to interconnect the components in a breadboard
- Jumper cable (vehicle), a pair of electrical cables used to jump start a vehicle
- Jumper Cable, the 33rd book in the Xanth series by Piers Anthony

== See also ==
- Jumper (disambiguation)
