= Stephen Gould =

Stephen Gould may refer to:

- Stephen Jay Gould (1941–2002), American paleontologist, evolutionary biologist and historian of science
- Stephen Gould (tenor) (1962–2023), American opera singer

== See also ==
- Steven Gould (born 1955), American science fiction author and teacher
- Steve Gould (disambiguation)
