= Steve Gould =

Steve Gould may refer to:

- Steve Gould (musician) (born 1950), British musician with the bands Rare Bird and Runner
- Steve Gould (curler) (born 1972), Canadian curler

== See also ==
- Steven Gould (born 1955), American science fiction author
- Stephen Gould (disambiguation)
