= Genevieve Kang =

Canadian actress

- Born: Kamloops, British Columbia, Canada
- Occupation: Actress
- Years active: 2004–present

Genevieve Kang is a Canadian actress. She is known for playing Jackie Veda in the fantasy drama series Locke & Key and Patty Yang in the sci-fi drama series Impulse.

== Early life ==
Kang was born in Kamloops, British Columbia, to a Chinese father and a Portuguese mother. She fell in love with acting at the age of 14 when she performed in a high school production of The Wizard of Oz. Kang is a graduate of the Institute of Holistic Nutrition.

== Career ==
Early on in her career, Kang made appearances in the horror drama series The Strain and the comedy drama series Private Eyes, playing Jax and Sadie Tufts respectively. Her first significant role came playing Patty Yang in the sci-fi drama series Impulse. She later played Jackie Veda in the fantasy drama series Locke & Key. She also had a recurring role in the supernatural drama series Shadowhunters, portraying Morgan Young.

== Personal life ==
Kang is the founder of KIKAN BLVD, a modern holistic lifestyle brand dedicated to optimizing health and vitality. She cites Natalie Portman and Alicia Vikander as her acting idols.

== Filmography ==
=== Film ===
Year	Title	Role	Notes
2010	Score: A Hockey Musical	Female Teen	
2012	If I Were You	Office Assistant	
2012	The Good Witch's Charm	Katie	
2018	Christmas With a View	Darlene	
2018	Pride, Prejudice and Mistletoe	Erica	
2018	Nose to Tail	Angela	
2019	Run This Town	The Squirrel	
2019	Crossword Mysteries: A Puzzle To Die For	Josephine	
2019	Crossword Mysteries: Proposing Murder	Josephine	
2019	Crossword Mysteries: Abracadaver	Josephine	
2024	Conditions of Release	Hannah	Short

=== Television ===
Year	Title	Role	Notes
2004	Romeo!	Denise Cruz	Episode; Speechless in Seattle
2005	Beautiful People	Madeleine	3 episodes
2011-2012	What's Up Warthogs!	Kara Lee Burk	Episode; Taekwonzombie
2011	Life with Boys	Poster Girl	Episode; Wrestling with Boys
2012	Really Me	Teen Girl#1	Episode; A Nightmare on Elm Street
2014	The Strain	Jax	Episode; Gone Smooth
2017	Private Eyes	Sadie Tufts	Episode; The P.I. Code
2018	Shadowhunters	Morgan Young	2 episodes
2018	Odd Squad	Baroness Goo	Episode; It Takes Goo to Make a Feud Go Right/Friends of Odd Squad
2019	Jett	Miss Kennedy	2 episodes
2018-2019	Impulse	Patty Yang	10 episodes
2020-2021	Locke & Key	Jackie Veda	16 episodes
2023	Goosebumps	Ann Macy	Episode; Night of the Living Dummy: Part 2
