= Locke & Key (TV series) =

2020 American supernatural horror drama television series

- Genre: Fantasy drama; Supernatural horror
- Based on: Locke & Key by Joe Hill and Gabriel Rodriguez
- Developed by: Carlton Cuse; Meredith Averill; Aron Eli Coleite
- Starring: Darby Stanchfield; Connor Jessup; Emilia Jones; Jackson Robert Scott; Petrice Jones; Laysla De Oliveira; Griffin Gluck; Aaron Ashmore; Hallea Jones; Brendan Hines; Kevin Durand; Sherri Saum; Coby Bird
- Music by: Torin Borrowdale
- Country of origin: United States
- Original language: English
- No. of seasons: 3
- No. of episodes: 28

Production
- Executive producers: Carlton Cuse; Meredith Averill; Lindsey Springer; Tim Southam; Michael Morris; Joe Hill; John Weber; Frank Siracusa; Aron Eli Coleite; Chris Ryall; Ted Adams; Lydia Antonini; Andy Muschietti; Barbara Muschietti; David Alpert; Rick Jacobs; Kevin Lafferty (seasons 2–3)
- Producers: Ra'uf Glasgow; Kevin Lafferty (season 1); Nishpeksh Mehra; Mackenzie Dohr; Nicole Lane
- Production locations: Toronto, Ontario; Lunenburg, Nova Scotia
- Cinematography: Tico Poulakakis; Colin Hoult; Dylan Macleod; Michael Marshall
- Editors: Matthew V. Colonna; Lilly Urban; Paul Trejo; Andrew Behrens; Philip Fowler; Josh Beal; Anna Hauger; Mark Hartzell
- Camera setup: Single-camera
- Running time: 33–56 minutes
- Production companies: Genre Arts; Hard A Productions; Circle of Confusion; IDW Entertainment

Original release
- Network: Netflix
- Release: February 7, 2020 – August 10, 2022

Locke & Key is an American fantasy drama television series developed by Carlton Cuse, Meredith Averill, and Aron Eli Coleite, based on the comic book series of the same name by Joe Hill and Gabriel Rodríguez. It premiered on Netflix on February 7, 2020. The series stars Darby Stanchfield, Connor Jessup, Emilia Jones, Jackson Robert Scott, Laysla De Oliveira, Petrice Jones, and Griffin Gluck.

In December 2020, ahead of the second-season premiere on October 22, 2021, the series was renewed for a third season which premiered on August 10, 2022. In April 2022, it was announced that the third season would be its last, as originally planned by the show's creators.

== Premise ==
After Rendell Locke is murdered by former student Sam Lesser, his wife Nina decides to move with her three children, Tyler, Kinsey, and Bode, from Seattle to Matheson, Massachusetts, and take up residence in Rendell's family home, Keyhouse. The children soon discover a number of mysterious keys throughout the house that can be used to unlock various doors in magical ways. They soon become aware of a demonic entity that is also searching for the keys for its own malevolent purposes.

== Cast and characters ==
=== Main ===
- Darby Stanchfield as Nina Locke, the Locke family matriarch who moves to Keyhouse with her children following the death of her husband
- Connor Jessup as Tyler Locke, the Locke family's eldest son
- Emilia Jones as Kinsey Locke, the Locke family's middle child and only daughter
- Jackson Robert Scott as Bode Locke, the Locke family's youngest son (Note: Scott also portrays Dodge in season 3 when his body is possessed after time traveling.)
- Petrice Jones as Scot Cavendish (seasons 1–2; recurring season 3), a British student filmmaker at Matheson Academy, leader of the Savini Squad and Kinsey's love interest
- Laysla De Oliveira as Dodge (season 1; recurring seasons 2–3), the "well lady" of Keyhouse who is revealed to be a demonic entity (Note: De Oliveira also portrays Ellie at the end of season 1 and at the end of season 2.)
- Griffin Gluck as Gabe (seasons 1–2; guest season 3), Dodge's male persona who poses as a student at Matheson Academy
- Aaron Ashmore as Duncan Locke (season 2; recurring seasons 1, 3), Rendell's younger brother who used to live in Keyhouse
- Hallea Jones as Eden Hawkins (season 2; recurring season 1; guest season 3), Jackie's best friend at Matheson Academy.
- Brendan Hines as Josh Bennett (seasons 2–3), the history teacher at Matheson Academy and Nina's love interest. He is also a descendant of Frederick Gideon.
- Kevin Durand as Frederick Gideon (season 3; recurring season 2), a captain in the British Army during the American Revolutionary War who was the first person to discover the portal behind the Black Door and become possessed by a demon.
- Sherri Saum as Ellie Whedon (season 3; recurring season 1; guest season 2), the physical education teacher at Matheson Academy, an old friend of Rendell and one of the former Keepers of the Keys
- Coby Bird as Rufus Whedon (season 3; recurring season 1; guest season 2), Ellie's adopted son and the groundskeeper of Keyhouse who befriends Bode. He is fascinated by the army and weapons.

=== Recurring ===
- Bill Heck as Rendell Locke (season 1; guest seasons 2–3), the deceased Locke family patriarch who used to live in Keyhouse and one of the former Keepers of the Keys
- Joy Tanner as Erin Voss (seasons 1–2), an old friend of Rendell and one of the former Keepers of the Keys
- Thomas Mitchell Barnet as Sam Lesser (season 1; guest seasons 2–3), Rendell's former student who shoots and kills him, leading to Sam's incarceration.
- Genevieve Kang as Jackie Veda (seasons 1–2), Tyler's crush at Matheson Academy and eventual girlfriend.
- Kevin Alves as Javi (seasons 1–2), Tyler's friend and hockey teammate at Matheson Academy.
- Kolton Stewart as Brinker Martin (seasons 1–2), Javi's friend and head of the school hockey team at Matheson Academy
- Asha Bromfield as Zadie Wells, one of Scot's friends and member of the Savini Squad
- Jesse Camacho as Doug Brazelle, one of Scot's friends and cameraman for the Savini Squad
- Eric Graise as Logan Calloway (seasons 1–2; guest season 3), a student at Matheson Academy who befriends Tyler
- Felix Mallard as Lucas "Dodge" Caravaggio (season 1; guest season 2), Rendell's best friend from high school, Dodge's original host, and one of the former Keepers of the Keys (Note: Mallard also portrays Dodge in season 1.)
- Steven Williams as Joe Ridgeway (season 1), the school principal and Tyler's English teacher at Matheson Academy
- Martin Roach as Daniel Mutuku (seasons 1–2), a detective in Matheson who befriends Nina.
- Chris Britton as Chamberlin Locke (season 2; guest seasons 1, 3), the great-great-grandfather of the Locke children who remains at Keyhouse as a ghost
- Michael Therriault as Gordie Shaw (season 3; guest season 2), Rendell and Ellie's former classmate who loves the performing arts and theatre
- Ian Lake as James Bolton (season 3; guest season 2), a Revolutionary War soldier serving under Gideon.
- Jeff Lillico as Samuel Coffey (season 3; guest season 2), a Revolutionary War soldier serving under Gideon.
- Oriana Leman as Carly (seasons 3), a construction worker from Montana who has an interest in Tyler.

== Episodes ==
=== Series overview ===
Season	Episodes	Originally released
1	10	February 7, 2020
2	10	October 22, 2021
3	8	August 10, 2022

=== Season 1 (2020) ===
No. overall	No. in season	Title	Directed by	Written by	Original release date
1	1	"Welcome to Matheson"	Michael Morris	Joe Hill & Aron Eli Coleite	February 7, 2020
A man receives a phone call and inserts a key into his chest, causing himself and his house to be incinerated. Three months later, the Locke family relocates to Matheson, Massachusetts, after family patriarch Rendell's murder. They move into Keyhouse, Rendell's ancestral home, with the help of Rendell's younger brother Duncan. Rendell was shot by his student, Sam. Youngest Locke son Bode comes across the well house, where he hears the voice of a woman claiming to be his echo. As eldest son Tyler and daughter Kinsey start school, Bode explores Keyhouse and hears strange whispers that lead him to magical keys hidden throughout the house. He finds the Anywhere Key, which can be used on any door to travel to any place he has seen, and the Mirror Key, which opens a portal to a dimension within any mirror. The Locke children's mother, Nina, becomes trapped in the mirror dimension. Echo tells Bode she can save his mother if he gives her the Anywhere Key. He does so, but she uses the key to escape the well house. Tyler and Kinsey arrive in time to help Nina out of the mirror. Echo meets with Sam Lesser, currently in prison for having killed Rendell.
2	2	"Trapper / Keeper"	Michael Morris	Liz Phang	February 7, 2020
The Locke children find their mother has no recollection of being trapped in the mirror dimension. At school, Tyler becomes interested in Jackie, while Kinsey struggles to fit in until she meets Scot and others of the "Savini squad", who are trying to make a low budget horror film, and cautiously joins them. Bode fears that Echo may come back and bonds with Rufus, the young Keyhouse groundskeeper. With help from Rufus, Bode tries to set a trap for Echo, but when she returns after using the Anywhere Key to travel the world, she detects the trap and warns Bode not to disappoint her. Bode finds another key, and after seeing a keyhole appear on the back of a store clerk's neck, tries to use it on himself just as Tyler and Kinsey arrive home. They find that Bode has used the Head Key, allowing them to enter a representation of his mind.
3	3	"Head Games"	Tim Southam	Meredith Averill	February 7, 2020
Tyler and Kinsey go with Bode into his mind, which resembles a fantastical arcade, and Bode shows them a memory of Rendell. Echo travels to the burned-down home where the man killed himself with a key, and she recovers the undamaged key. After a hockey game, Tyler finds one of the school bullies hitting on Kinsey, and he beats the bully up due to repressed guilt, a decision that gets him in trouble with teacher Joe Ridgeway. The next day, Tyler lets Kinsey use the Head Key to enter her mind, which manifests as a distorted shopping mall, to find more memories of their father. The two are chased by a representation of Kinsey's fear before they escape. Meanwhile, Bode finds the Ghost Key, which frees his soul from his body and allows him to speak to other ghosts, including his great-great-grandfather Chamberlin Locke, who mentions Rendell and Duncan had visited him often when they were younger. Nina goes out for dinner with Ellie, Rendell's old friend and Rufus's mother. When Nina mentions Bode searching the well house, Ellie becomes gravely concerned. Kinsey skips a date with Scot to use the Head Key on herself, later dragging the representation of her fear out of her mind and burying it. Hidden from view, Echo is secretly watching Kinsey in the woods.
4	4	"The Keepers of the Keys"	Tim Southam	Mackenzie Dohr	February 7, 2020
Kinsey becomes more open and engaging at school the next day; she tells Tyler she used the Head Key to take out the manifestation of her fear from her mind. Talking more with Ellie, Nina learns that most of Rendell's friends are dead, with Mark Cho recently killed in a house fire; other than Ellie, only Erin Voss is alive, but she lives in a psychiatric facility. Ellie helps Nina tear down a wall put up in the house's basement to block a recreation room, where Nina finds an old cabinet. Kinsey invites Scot back to her house and uses the Head Key to show him her mind, where they share a kiss. The next evening, Echo appears and tries to take the Head Key from Bode, but Bode realizes that she can only take it if he willingly gives it to her. Echo disappears and returns to Sam, giving him the Matchstick Key retrieved from Mark's house and instructions on what to do next.
5	5	"Family Tree"	Mark Tonderai-Hodges	Andres Fischer-Centeno	February 7, 2020
Tyler and Kinsey are drawn to another hidden key, which they find is the Music Box Key; when inserted into a music box, it allows the wielder to control a person's actions. At school, Eden insults Scot, and in retaliation, Kinsey and Gabe use the Music Box Key on her, which Tyler sees when her embarrassing actions are caught on social media. Tyler warns Kinsey about abusing the keys' powers, not wanting to draw attention. That evening, Tyler and Kinsey hear more whispering and find the Plant Key in the graveyard. When they use it on a nearby tree, several jars are uprooted from the ground. The jars contain memories from Duncan's childhood, and they find one of a young Rendell beating his friend Lucas to death. Meanwhile, Nina becomes suspicious of a scar on Ellie's chest that is identical to one Rendell had. However, Ellie refuses to say anything about it. Later, Nina receives a message from Joe, saying he has seen something strange and needs to show it to her. When she arrives at his house, she finds him dead by suffocation and immediately calls the police. Unbeknownst to Nina, Ellie is hiding outside of Joe's house.
6	6	"The Black Door"	Mark Tonderai-Hodges	Brett Treacy & Dan Woodward	February 7, 2020
Nina attempts to convince the police that Ridgeway did not kill himself, but fails. Kinsey confronts Duncan about the memories, but he has no recollection of any of the events, except vaguely remembering some caves near the shoreline. Kinsey convinces the Savini squad to film in those caves as a pretext to explore further. Within, she finds a door in the shape of an omega symbol, known as the Black Door. As the tide quickly rises, Kinsey has to be dragged away from the door by her friends, and they all flee to escape the cave. Scot is furious with her, but Gabe considers her actions brave and starts to get closer to her. Echo goes to a party where Tyler is getting drunk and angering Jackie. As Tyler storms out, Echo introduces herself to him as Dodge and flirts with him. Sam uses the Matchstick Key Dodge gave him to burn down the prison and escape, making his way to Keyhouse.
7	7	"Dissection"	Dawn Wilkinson	Michael D. Fuller	February 7, 2020
In the past, Rendell counsels Sam, who is distracted by Dodge's voice coming from the picture of Keyhouse on the office wall. Later, she seduces him through the picture. In the present, Sam breaks into the house and takes the Lockes hostage, demanding the Head Key. Sam reveals that Dodge wants the Head Key to open the Black Door, claiming that only she cares for him. Tyler and Dodge have sex and he discovers who she is. He runs home and attacks Sam, in vain. Kinsey claims the Head Key is buried outside but lures him to the site she buried her fear. Tyler frees Nina, and when Sam returns after overpowering Kinsey's fear, Tyler uses the Head Key on him. Sam's inner self embraces Tyler, weeping. They learn that Rendell's murder was not planned and he had to find the keys for Dodge. Sam removes the key from his own neck just as Dodge appears. She stabs him, scorns him, and takes all of the keys, revealing that only the Lockes can resist her request. As the police arrive, Sam leaves through the door that Bode unlocked with the Ghost Key, and his ethereal form is separated from his now-dead body. He hovers above the house and fades. Nina starts drinking.
8	8	"Ray of F**king Sunshine"	Dawn Wilkinson	Vanessa Rojas	February 7, 2020
Nina begins drinking in the wake of recent events, which causes her to start to remember some events involving the keys. She uses the Mending Key, which allows a cabinet to restore damaged objects to their original form. Tyler and Kinsey feel that while having these memories may be helpful, they would rather have Nina sober, so they convince her to stop drinking. Tyler and Kinsey travel to the cave with the Black Door and find a list of the "Keepers of the Keys" written on the wall, which includes Rendell and his friends. Kinsey decides to visit Erin at the facility where she lives. Dodge beats her there and uses the Head Key to find the location of the Omega Key from Erin. By the time Kinsey arrives, Erin identifies Dodge as Lucas, one of Rendell's old friends. Dodge, having taken the form of Lucas using the Identity Key, is staying with Ellie and Rufus. After Nina smashes the urn containing Rendell's ashes in a fit of rage, Tyler locates the Omega Key among the ashes, because Rendell had hidden it inside of his own head.
9	9	"Echoes"	Vincenzo Natali	Meredith Averill & Liz Phang	February 7, 2020
The Locke children confront Ellie about Lucas, and she explains that years prior, her boyfriend Lucas (nicknamed Dodge) had been possessed by something that came through the Black Door and had killed two of their friends before Rendell killed him. Ellie and her friends hid all evidence of this, including removing Duncan's memories, and split up and hid the keys to prevent anyone from using them again. However, years later, still longing for Lucas, Ellie used the Echo Key at the well house to try to bring him back, only to bring back the entity that had possessed him – "Dodge" – instead. Ellie had called Mark about Rendell's murder so that he would use the Matchstick Key to immolate himself and keep the mapped locations of the other keys from Dodge. Once Dodge escaped the well house, she turned back into Lucas's form to live with Ellie and Rufus, coercing Ellie to steal the Crown of Shadows from Keyhouse. In the present day, Ellie and Rufus take the Shadow Key and go back to their house to retrieve the crown. Dodge is back at their house, though, waiting for them, and he takes the Shadow Key from Ellie to use for himself.
10	10	"Crown of Shadows"	Vincenzo Natali	Carlton Cuse & Meredith Averill	February 7, 2020
Now possessing both the Shadow Key and the Crown of Shadows, Dodge is able to conjure powerful shadow monsters, and she sends them to attack Keyhouse in search of the Omega Key. After Bode destroys Dodge's shadow using the Matchstick Key, Dodge is found unconscious. Tyler and Kinsey send her back through the Black Door with the help of Scot, Gabe, Jackie, and Eden. Bode finds Rufus injured but alive, but discovers no sign of Ellie. Rufus is sent to live with his aunt and uncle in Nebraska. The Lockes decide to stay in Matheson, and Kinsey starts dating Gabe, unaware that he is another form of Dodge; Dodge had used the Identity Key to change Ellie's form into Dodge's, and Ellie was the one who was thrown through the Black Door. Eden is also now possessed, having been hit by one of the demonic bullets while the door was open.

=== Season 2 (2021) ===
No. overall	No. in season	Title	Directed by	Written by	Original release date
11	1	"The Premiere"	Mark Tonderai	Meredith Averill & Carlton Cuse	October 22, 2021
Gabe and Eden go into the sea caves to obtain Whispering Iron. Bode tests out a new key called the Hercules Key, which gives the user superhuman strength, and he discovers a mysterious giant rat skull in Keyhouse. Duncan moves into Keyhouse with the rest of the Locke family while his fiancé Brian is staying in Tokyo for six months. Gabe and Eden take over a cabin in the woods as their operating base. That night, the premiere of the Savini squad's movie The Splattering is being held at a local theater. Scot appears at the premiere after secluding himself for most of the summer to edit the film. At the after party, Scot tells Kinsey that he applied for a film program at Rochester College in England and that he will be moving away very shortly if they accept him. Jackie starts forgetting the magic of the keys, as her eighteenth birthday is quickly approaching, which greatly concerns Tyler. Gabe and Eden melt down the Whispering Iron they obtained to make a key of their own.
12	2	"The Head and the Heart"	Mark Tonderai	Liz Phang	October 22, 2021
Gabe and Eden test out their newly made key, but it does not have the effects they desired, and they only have enough Whispering Iron to make one more key. Nina starts her new job renovating the school theater at Matheson Academy, where she meets history teacher Josh Bennett. Bode becomes friends with a new girl at school named Jamie, and he tells her about the keys. When Nina picks up Bode from school, she finds out that Jamie is Josh's daughter. Gabe visits Keyhouse, and Bode gives him the Ghost Key so he can try it out. As a ghost, Gabe visits Chamberlin Locke and asks him how to make a key. Chamberlin tells him he must infuse the key with the intention of what he wants it to do, and he must also offer a drop of blood as a sacrifice. Kinsey and Tyler visit Erin at the psychiatric hospital and use the Head Key on her so they can find a way for adults to remember magic. While inside Erin's head, they find a younger version of her who has been trapped inside for twenty-three years. After freeing the second Erin from her head, Erin finally regains consciousness.
13	3	"Small World"	Mairzee Almas	Mackenzie Dohr	October 22, 2021
Twenty-three years ago, a housekeeper at Keyhouse finds Erin using the Head Key and accidentally dislodges it, inadvertently trapping Erin inside of her own head. In the present, Erin moves into Keyhouse until her trust fund comes through. Bode finds the Small World Key, and when he visits Jamie at her house, she shows him that she has a dollhouse version of Keyhouse. They figure out that when the Small World Key is inserted into the dollhouse, anything that occurs in the dollhouse also happens in the real Keyhouse. At school, Gabe attempts to drive a wedge between Kinsey and Scot by having Eden use the Music Box Key to control Scot to attack him. When Eden returns the music box to Keyhouse, she inadvertently leaves the Anywhere Key behind, which is recovered by Duncan. Later that day, a spider crawls into the dollhouse, becoming giant in the real Keyhouse and wreaking havoc before Jamie kills it. Gabe and Eden make their second attempt at making their key, but the key explodes, ruining their last piece of Whispering Iron. Erin reveals to Tyler and Kinsey that they had Duncan create a key that made adults remember magic before they removed his memories. Feeling guilty about her actions, Erin has Tyler return Duncan's memories to him using the Head Key.
14	4	"Forget Me Not"	Mairzee Almas	Vanessa Rojas	October 22, 2021
Duncan struggles to adjust to the return of his lost memories, resulting in extreme mood swings and hallucinations, causing the Lockes and Erin to realize that his best chance at a full recovery is to find the Memory Key. As a present for Jackie's eighteenth birthday, Tyler brings Jackie to Bath, England using the Anywhere Key. However, she soon forgets the magic, and she becomes disoriented and wants to go home. Gabe, realizing that Chamberlin had lied to him, uses the Ghost Key once again to confront him. While he is distracted, Sam's ghost tries to take over Gabe's body. However, Gabe manages to eject Sam out of his body, leaving him trapped as a ghost once again. Kinsey concentrates to retrieve the embodiment of her fear, and she puts it back into her head. Josh holds a dorm social that night, and he reveals to some of his students that his ancestor was a soldier in the British Army during the American Revolutionary War. Seeing that Josh has a piece of Whispering Iron, Gabe steals it, but earns Kinsey's mistrust in the process due to his strange behavior around Eden. Desperate to find the Memory Key, Erin digs up her long-buried last memory of Rendell, which reveals that he had hidden the key somewhere at Matheson Academy.
15	5	"Past is Prologue"	Carlton Cuse	Meredith Averill	October 22, 2021
Gabe visits Keyhouse in search of the music box to force Kinsey to make his key for him. In the process, Gabe learns of their efforts to restore Duncan's memories and becomes interested in Duncan's ability to make keys. Tyler searches Matheson Academy for the Memory Key with the help of Gabe and Logan, finally finding it underneath a bench with the use of the Hercules Key. Meanwhile, Bode uses the Anywhere Key to visit Rufus in Nebraska, where he learns from Rufus that there were two Dodges on the night of the shadow attack on Keyhouse. Nina has dinner with Josh, and when she leaves, Josh notices that his Whispering Iron is missing. Kinsey attends a party where she makes some amends with Scot before Eden's strange behavior prompts Kinsey, and later Scot, to enter Eden's mind using the Head Key. From Eden's memories, Kinsey and Scot learn that Eden is a demon and that Gabe is Dodge. Tyler and Erin use the Memory Key on Duncan, successfully reintegrating his lost memories before Kinsey arrives with the distressing news about Gabe and Eden. At that moment, Gabe arrives at the front door of Keyhouse.
16	6	"The Maze"	Mairzee Almas	Kimi Howl Lee	October 22, 2021
Gabe asks Kinsey and Tyler how things went with Duncan and the Memory Key, but they tell him the key did not work and that he should leave. Later, Bode comes back from Nebraska and tells Tyler and Kinsey that there were two Dodges on the night of the shadow attack, and they figure out that they must have thrown Ellie through the Black Door instead of Dodge. The next day, Bode and Duncan hear whispering, which leads them to the Chain Key. Tyler, Kinsey, and Bode then arrive at the annual Winter Fest, where they pretend to not suspect Gabe until they are able to formulate a plan. Tyler tells Jackie he can use the Memory Key on her so that she can remember all the magic of the keys again, but Jackie refuses, believing it is better to move on and leave that in the past. Erin takes the Chain Key for herself so she can defeat Dodge on her own. Erin confronts Gabe in the Snow Maze, but he chokes her to death and buries her using the Plant Key. The Lockes see this, and realize they must take matters into their own hands. Kinsey calls Gabe and tells him that the Memory Key finally worked for Duncan and that he should come over the next day.
17	7	"Best Laid Plans"	Millicent Shelton	Michael D. Fuller	October 22, 2021
Duncan, Tyler, Kinsey, and Bode hold a memorial ceremony for Erin in the woods. Scot arrives, and the group discusses their plan to defeat Dodge. Gabe and Eden arrive believing that they will be filming the sequel to The Splattering. While Gabe films with Scot and Kinsey, Jamie uses the dollhouse to trap Eden under a giant glass—until Josh interrupts. Tyler uses the Anywhere Key to open a door to the well house, where Gabe/Echo will be destroyed, but Gabe uses the Chain Key to immobilize Kinsey and then Bode. He uses the Anywhere Key to take Duncan and Bode to his cabin, leaving Eden behind. She wounds Scot and escapes. Tyler, Kinsey, and Scot find the cabin's address on Eden's food delivery receipts, and they drive to the rescue. Gabe threatens to kill Bode, so Duncan creates Gabe's Demon Key, which turns the victim into a demon slave. Dodge tests it on Javi, whom Eden lured to his doom. Gabe releases Duncan and Bode, but sends Javi to kill them. Tyler, Kinsey, and Scot arrive just in time to rescue Duncan and Bode.
18	8	"Irons in the Fire"	Millicent Shelton	Jordan Riggs	October 22, 2021
In 1775, Captain Frederick Gideon raids Keyhouse, which is being used by the Continental Army to build and hide weapons for the American Revolutionary War. Peter Locke is killed by Gideon, who is then forced to flee to the seaside caves when the local militia intervenes. Gideon's touch causes a portal to open in the caves, infecting both Gideon and another soldier with demons. Gideon is captured and hanged for his crimes, but he warns that the evil isn't over yet. Using some of the Whispering Iron left behind, Benjamin Locke crafts the Black Door and the Omega Key to seal away the portal. In the present, the Lockes attempt to protect their remaining friends from Gabe as he uses his new Demon Key to turn people into demons. However, their efforts fail as Gabe turns Jackie into a demon. Tyler decides that they must craft a new key that can "unlock" the demon from a host's soul and finds some Whispering Iron hidden in his father's old fishing lure. With only Tyler hearing the whispers from the metal, Duncan reveals that Tyler must craft this new key himself under the guidance of Duncan.
19	9	"Alpha & Omega"	Mark Tonderai	Meredith Averill & Liz Phang	October 22, 2021
Gabe gives Kinsey a day to become a demon, or he will kill Nina. At school, Eden kills Javi, who has been spying on her for Gabe, and takes the Anywhere Key. Duncan guides Tyler in crafting the Alpha Key, to "unlock" the demon from a person's soul. Scot reveals to Kinsey that he turned down the Rochester program. An unseen ghost leads Kinsey and Scot to the Angel Key. They think it is Chamberlin: it is Sam. Nina unburdens herself at an AA meeting attended by demon-infected Mutuku. Eden leads Josh to the Black Door. Gabe shows up and uses the Crown of Shadows to bring down the cave and open the door. Bode and Jamie rescue a bewildered Josh using the Hercules Key. Josh quickly forgets everything. Tyler meets Jackie in the woods near Gabe's cliffside house and uses the Alpha Key to evict the demon from her body. Suddenly, tears of metal come from her eyes. She dies in Tyler's arms moments later. At the Black Door, Ellie, still looking like Dodge, emerges from a pile of rocks, shuts the door, and flees from the collapsing cave.
20	10	"Cliffhanger"	Mark Tonderai	Carlton Cuse & Meredith Averill	October 22, 2021
While Tyler, Duncan, and Scot sneak into Gabe's house to steal the Demon Key, Kinsey refuses Gabe's offer and escapes with the Angel Key, which gives her wings. Tyler uses the Alpha Key to kill Mutuku and several other demons before Duncan discovers that, as the creator of the Demon Key, he can control the demons; he turns them against Dodge, who destroys the house with the Plant Key. As Dodge and Kinsey fight, Tyler sneaks up on Dodge and kills the demon with the Alpha Key. The real Lucas emerges from the wreckage and returns the stolen keys. As an echo, he has survived his separation from Dodge. Ellie is reunited with Lucas and restored to her true form. Later, Tyler leaves on a road trip and decides not to use the Memory Key so that he can live a normal life. Ellie reunites with Rufus in Nebraska. The Savini squad holds a send-off party for Scot before he leaves for school in England. Bode uses the Head Key on Nina to show her happy memories of Rendell. She wants to remember magic, and Bode, revealing the Memory Key, tells her she can. Eden recovers the Echo Key from Gabe's dorm room and uses it to summon Gideon, who then throws Eden down the well and escapes using the Anywhere Key.

=== Season 3 (2022) ===
No. overall	No. in season	Title	Directed by	Written by	Original release date
21	1	"The Snow Globe"	Guy Ferland	Liz Phang	August 10, 2022
Nina finds a miniature Keyhouse in a snow globe. She thinks it's magical while Kinsey and Bode taunt her saying she is seeing magical objects everywhere now. They are all excited by the upcoming wedding. Tyler, now framing houses in Montana, does not reply, even to the wedding invitation. Later, Bode finds the Snow Globe key after hearing whispers coming from the kitchen's freezer. Curious, Nina and Bode find themselves inside the snow globe as a result of using the new key, accidentally freeing two demons who were trapped inside, but locking Bode in the snow globe in the process. Rufus convinces Ellie to move back to Matheson, where everyone thinks she was missing and wandering the streets of Pittsburgh. The demons join Gideon who is camping in the woods nearby while attempting to reopen the gate between worlds. Gideon sends the two demons to steal the key from Eden's corpse at the bottom of the well. Kinsey rushes back to Keyhouse and joins Nina as they search for the demons. As they attack Kinsey and Nina, the demons demand the remainder of the Locke keys in exchange for the snow globe key to free Bode. Kinsey and Nina trap the demons using the mirror key. Kinsey sends a picture of herself and Bode to Tyler in an attempt to get him to return for the wedding. Gideon opens a new portal by combining two keys.
22	2	"Wedding Crashers"	Guy Ferland	Michael D. Fuller	August 10, 2022
The Locke Family prepare for Duncan and Brian's wedding. Bode finds a new key, the Timeshift key, and goes back in time twice, once to meet Benjamin Locke and once to meet a young Duncan. In the present, Duncan confiscates the Timeshift key and gives it to Nina. During the wedding, Gideon and two Echoes he resurrects, James and Samuel, search for keys, but only find the Plant key. Tyler, who came for Duncan's wedding, and Kinsey fight off the three soldiers. Duncan and Brian drive off for their honeymoon, while Tyler, worried about Gideon's attack, decides to hang around for a while to protect his family.
23	3	"Five Minutes Past"	Ed Ornelas	Vanessa Rojas	August 10, 2022
Bode tries to steal the Timeshift key from Nina to visit his father. Nina catches him, then uses the Head key to revisit her memories so Bode can see his father again. Instead, Nina sees her alcoholic self and cuts their trip short. Nina revisits her memories alone and sees how her drinking endangered the family. Kinsey discovers Eden dead in the Wellhouse, and with the help of the Savini Squad, hold a memorial for Eden in which they sing a song in her memory, then throw her body off a cliff. Ellie applies as a coach at Matheson Academy but does not push through because people gossip that she neglected her son Rufus during the time she disappeared. Bode finally manages to find the Timeshift key from Nina, but he accidentally goes back to the time Dodge was forcing Duncan to make the Demon key. Bode returns to the present with Dodge. Dodge used the Ghost door to trap Bode as a ghost, allowing Dodge to possess Bode's body.
24	4	"Deep Cover"	Ed Ornelas	Mackenzie Dohr	August 10, 2022
Dodge is now in Bode's body. Dodge finds out he can take the keys without getting burned. Bode meets up with Gideon, who explains his plan to combine the human and demon world and asks Dodge to steal all the keys. Rufus comes to Keyhouse and immediately suspects Bode is Dodge. They fight, and Nina and Ellie stop them. Dodge threatens to kill both moms if Rufus tries to make trouble again. Carly, Tyler's friend from Montana, comes to visit. Tyler tells Carly that he feels he and Kinsey are drifting apart. Carly advises him to talk with Kinsey. Before Carly leaves for Montana, they kiss. Tyler asks to have his memories back. Kinsey uses the Memory key, but Dodge, disguised as Bode, finds out all the keys are in the Harlequin chest. Nina is suspicious of Bode's strange behavior, and discovers Dodge's body in Bode's room.
25	5	"Siege"	Marisol Adler	Meredith Averill	August 10, 2022
Dodge continues her efforts to find the keys while Rufus warns Ellie of his discovery that Bode is possessed by Dodge. At the same time, after finding Dodge's original body, Nina becomes suspicious and warns Tyler and Kinsey who quickly deduce the truth, subduing Dodge with the Chain Key. As the Lockes attempt to exorcise Dodge from Bode's body, Dodge warns them that Gideon – a demon much more powerful than Dodge and like a god to her kind – is coming after the keys with the intention of merging their two worlds. As Dodge likes the human world, she has been searching for the Alpha Key to kill Gideon. Under siege, the Lockes release Dodge to help them and she manages to kill Coffey, earning Kinsey's trust in the process. However, Duncan leaves Kinsey a voicemail revealing that the Timeshift Key has a time limit on anything displaced in time to prevent a paradox. As Dodge attempts to kill Gideon, she is suddenly returned to her own time, erasing Bode's body from existence. The Lockes are forced to flee Keyhouse as a triumphant Gideon uses the keys to open a portal to his world.
26	6	"Free Bird"	Marisol Adler	Jordan Riggs	August 10, 2022
Nina, Kinsey, and Tyler run to Ellie's place to plan. Gideon tries to merge the demon and human world but realizes he is still missing a key. He sends James to find the key. James makes his way to Ellie's place and forces Kinsey and Tyler back to Keyhouse to find the key. Bode is now a ghost, and he finds out Sam Lesser has been helping the family to make up for killing Rendell Locke. Sam teaches Bode to control birds. Tyler lies to Gideon, saying only a ghost can get the last key. James goes through the ghost door to find the key. Bode makes a bird go through the ghost door, then possesses the bird's body. Nina and Ellie arrive and fight Gideon. Meanwhile, Kinsey manages to steal the Animal key and uses it to turn Bode from a bird back into a boy. Gideon forces Ellie to reveal the last key's location: inside Gordie Shaw's head. Gideon locks up all the keys in the Harlequin chest, and James locks everyone in a closet. As soon as Gideon is gone, James unlocks the closet and reveals he is actually Sam in James's body.
27	7	"Curtain"	Jeremy Webb	Carlton Cuse & Joe Hill	August 10, 2022
Gideon goes to Gordie Shaw's house and stabs him, telling Ellie she should find the key in Gordie's head before he dies. Rufus, Kinsey, Tyler, and Sam (inside James's body) arrive. Rufus calls for medical help while Kinsey, Tyler, and Sam enter Gordie's head to rescue Ellie and find the last key. Ellie escapes Gideon and meets up with the three. Sam fights Gideon to help Ellie and the others escape. Kinsey hears the final key and finds it under the piano key. They get lost inside Gordie Shaw's head, and when he flatlines in real life, the door out of his head disappears.
28	8	"Farewell"	Jeremy Webb	Meredith Averill & Carlton Cuse	August 10, 2022
Tyler, Kinsey, Ellie and Gideon manage to escape from Gordie's head before he dies, but Sam is left trapped and dies with Gordie. Chased by Gideon, Tyler and Kinsey escape to Keyhouse where they attempt to force Gideon over the threshold of the Wellhouse in order to get rid of his echo for good. However, Gideon breaks free and destroys the Wellhouse. Using the Creation Key, Kinsey manages to retrieve the Alpha Key from the Harlequin Chest and stabs Gideon with it before he is shoved into his own portal by Nina, sending the dying demon home. Discovering that throwing the keys into the portal shrinks it, the Lockes decide that they must give up the magic for good, but not before using the Timeshift Key to say a final goodbye to Rendell in the past. After using the Memory Key to ensure that they will always remember the magic, the Lockes toss the keys into the portal and close it. Later, everyone attends the premiere of The Splattering II with Kinsey giving special thanks to Sam in the credits. Ellie returns to work as Matheson Academy's coach, Kinsey decides to explore overseas colleges to be closer to Scot while Bode finally accepts Josh in their life and Tyler returns to Montana, but promises to stay in closer touch with his family. However, the sound of whispering can be heard, suggesting that there might still be undiscovered keys in Keyhouse.

== Production ==
=== Background ===
Locke & Key was originally developed as a television series by the Fox broadcast network during the 2010–11 television season by DreamWorks Television and 20th Century Fox Television, with Josh Friedman writing the pilot script adaptation. Alex Kurtzman and Roberto Orci served as executive producers for the pilot, which starred Mark Pellegrino, Miranda Otto, Jesse McCartney, Sarah Bolger, Skylar Gaertner, and Nick Stahl. The pilot was not given a series order by Fox, though it was screened at the 2011 San Diego Comic-Con. At the 2014 San Diego Comic-Con, a feature-film trilogy was announced through Universal Pictures with Kurtzman and Orci expected to serve as executive producers.

=== Development ===
On May 9, 2016, IDW Entertainment was reported to again be developing a television-series adaptation of Locke & Key. The novel's author, Joe Hill, was expected to write the pilot and serve as an executive producer. The project was developed in association with Circle of Confusion with the intent of pitching the series to cable networks and streaming services.

On April 20, 2017, Hulu gave the production a pilot order. The production was developed by Carlton Cuse with Hill and set to be directed by Scott Derrickson. Cuse was expected to serve as the series' showrunner and executive producer alongside Hill, Derrickson, Lindsey Springer, Ted Adams, and David Ozer. Production companies involved with the pilot were to include Carlton Cuse Productions and IDW Entertainment. On July 14, 2017, it was reported that Andy Muschietti was replacing Derrickson as director, as Derrickson was forced to drop out of the production due to a scheduling conflict. On March 27, 2018, it was reported that Hulu had passed on the pilot and declined to order it to series.

On May 29, 2018, the production was reported to be in final negotiations with Netflix for a series order. Netflix redeveloped the property and discarded the Hulu pilot. Due to scheduling conflicts, Andy Muschietti was not expected to direct the new pilot, but would continue to serve as executive producer alongside Hill, Cuse, Adams, Ozer, and Barbara Muschietti. Production companies involved with the new iteration of the project were set to include Genre Arts and IDW Entertainment. On July 25, 2018, Netflix officially gave the production a series order for a first season consisting of ten episodes. Aron Eli Coleite, Meredith Averill, and Rick Jacobs were announced as new executive producers. Circle of Confusion was the anticipated production company. The new iteration was created by Hill and developed by Cuse, Coleite, and Averill. The new first episode was written by Hill and Coleite, with Cuse and Averill serving as showrunners. Michael Morris directed the first two episodes and served as an executive producer.

In adapting the comic for the Netflix series, the fictional town where Keyhouse is located was changed from Lovecraft to Matheson, Massachusetts. According to Cuse and Averill, this change had been suggested by Hill; because of the comic's Lovecraftian themes, the setting's name was to honor author H. P. Lovecraft, but Hill wanted to honor author and screenwriter Richard Matheson for the series, instead.

Although the series had not yet received an order beyond its first season, writing for a potential second season began ahead of the series' first-season premiere. On March 30, 2020, Netflix renewed the series for a second season. On December 18, 2020, ahead of the second-season premiere, Netflix renewed the series for a third season. On April 6, 2022, it was announced that the third season would be the show's last, as planned after the success of the first season.

=== Casting ===
In August 2017, Frances O'Connor and Jackson Robert Scott were cast in the pilot's leading roles. In September 2017, Megan Charpentier and Nate Corddry were reported to have joined the pilot's main cast. In October 2017, Jack Mulhern, Danny Glover, and Owen Teague were cast in starring roles in the pilot.

Alongside the announcement of the production's move to Netflix, it was revealed all of roles would be recast with the exception of Jackson Robert Scott as Bode Locke. On December 19, 2018, Connor Jessup and Emilia Jones were cast to replace Mulhern and Charpentier, respectively. In January 2019, Sherri Saum, Griffin Gluck, Steven Williams (replacing Glover), Darby Stanchfield (replacing O'Connor), Laysla De Oliveira, and Kevin Alves joined the cast with Gluck, Stanchfield, and De Oliveira in main roles and Williams and Alves recurring. In February 2019, Petrice Jones and Thomas Mitchell Barnet (replacing Teague) joined the main cast; Asha Bromfield and Felix Mallard were added in recurring roles.

Mirroring their appearances as characters in the comic book, creators Joe Hill and Gabriel Rodriguez had cameo appearances in the first-season finale as paramedics.

On September 30, 2020, Aaron Ashmore and Hallea Jones were promoted to series regulars while Brendan Hines was cast as a new series regular for the second season. On October 6, 2021, it was reported that Kevin Durand had joined the cast as a new series regular for the second season. On November 30, 2021, Saum was promoted to a series regular for the third season.

=== Filming ===
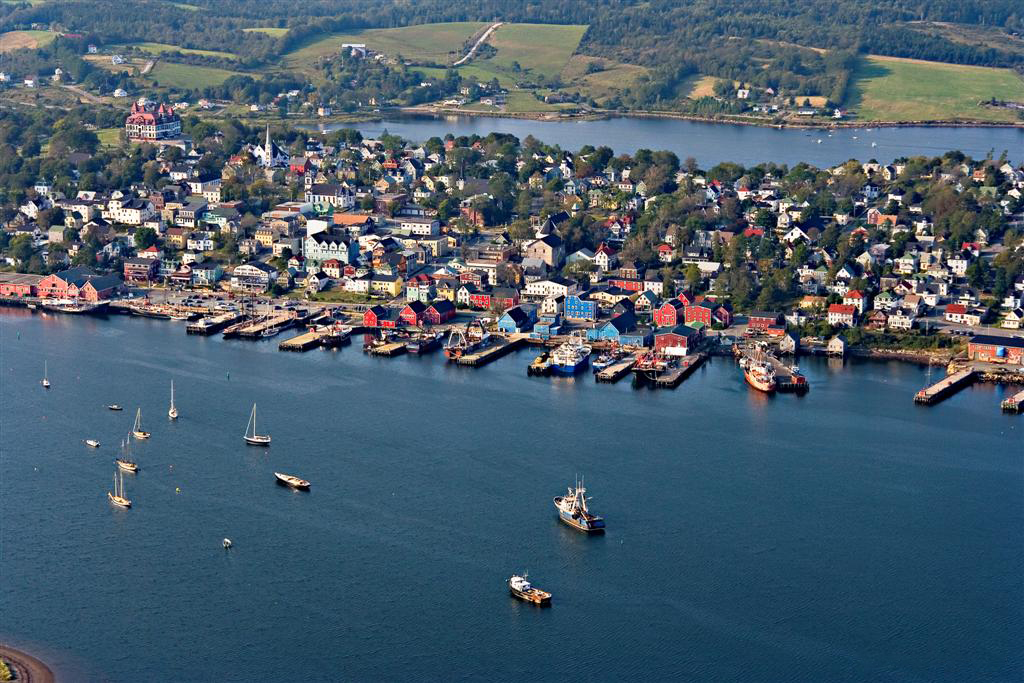
Lunenburg, Nova Scotia, was used for shots of the fictional Matheson, Massachusetts.

Principal photography took place from February 11 to July 5, 2019, in Hamilton and Toronto, Ontario, Canada. Scenes within the fictional Matheson, as well as some other exteriors, such as the outside of the Drowning Cave, were filmed in Lunenburg, Nova Scotia. Keyhouse itself was a constructed set and shot at Cinespace Film Studios in Toronto along with other interiors. The second season began filming on September 21, 2020, and concluded on April 16, 2021. The third season began filming on May 3, 2021, and concluded on September 17, 2021.

=== Music ===
Torin Borrowdale composed the series' score. When writing the main theme, Borrowdale wanted to elicit a feeling of magic and whimsey that would come with exploring a house with magical keys for the first time. Borrowdale implemented a solo cello in a low register for Dodge's theme to capture both the beauty and the darkness of Dodge's character. For Bode's theme, he created a simple tune that would be adaptable to the varying situations Bode got himself into, and variations on the theme were used to reflect the mood of the scene. The soundtrack was released on March 13, 2020.

== Release ==
In December 2019, Netflix announced that the series would be released on February 7, 2020, in the US and Canada. On January 8, 2020, Netflix released an official trailer for the series. A world premiere was held on February 5, 2020, in Hollywood, California. The second season was released on October 22, 2021. The third and final season was released on August 10, 2022.

== Reception ==
=== Audience viewership ===
In its first four weeks on Netflix, the second season amassed 143 million hours watched globally.

=== Critical response ===
On the review aggregator website Rotten Tomatoes, the first season has a 66% approval rating with 61 reviews, with an average rating of 6.58/10. The website's critics consensus reads, "Though Locke & Key at times struggles to strike a consistent tone, it captures enough of the essence of its source material to provide a fiendishly fun and sufficiently spooky time." On Metacritic, the first season has a score of 61 out of 100 based on 22 critics, indicating "generally favorable reviews". On Rotten Tomatoes, the second season has an 83% approval rating with 12 reviews, with an average rating of 7.7/10. The critics' consensus states, "Locke & Key improves in a raucous second season that turns on the charm while leaping from one cliffhanger to the next." On Rotten Tomatoes, the third season holds a 55% approval rating with 11 reviews, with an average rating of 6.2/10.

The series received generally positive reviews from critics, with the score, set design, and visual effects singled out as highlights. Critics mainly praised the handling of themes relating to loss and trauma and the use of horror genre elements, while criticizing the use of teen drama and romance subplots to drag out the story. The performances of Jackson Robert Scott and Laysla De Oliveira received particular praise.

USA Today claimed that the series was "nearly as strong a debut as Stranger Things was in 2016, but it [needed] a few tweaks to jump the hurdle between good and great." IGN credited its portrayal of trauma and the visual effects, and praised the performances of Scott and de Oliveira, while criticizing the series for failing to consistently build tension.

Polygon's review was more negative, criticizing the decision to make the television adaptation emphasize the coming-of-age story and fantasy elements, while glossing over the horror elements and haunting visuals of the source material. In particular, the review criticized the uninteresting subplots and inconsistent pacing.

=== Accolades ===
Year	Award	Category	Nominee(s)	Results	Ref.
2020	Harvey Awards	Best Adaptation from Comic Book/Graphic Novel	Locke & Key	Nominated	
2020	HPA Award	Outstanding Sound – Television	Chris Cooke, Eric Apps, J. R. Fountain & Dustin Harris (episode: "Welcome to Matheson")	Nominated	
2020	People's Choice Awards	Best Sci-Fi/Fantasy Show	Locke & Key	Nominated	
2020	Ruderman Family Foundation	Seal of Authentic Representation	Locke & Key	Won	
2021	Golden Reel Awards	Outstanding Achievement in Sound Editing – Dialogue and ADR for Episodic Short Form Broadcast Media	Dustin Harris & Jill Purdy (episode: "Crown of Shadows")	Nominated	
2021	Golden Reel Awards	Outstanding Achievement in Sound Editing – Sound Effects and Foley for Episodic Short Form Broadcast Media	J. R. Fountain, Dashen Naidoo & Steve Baine (episode: "Head Games")	Nominated	
2021	Saturn Awards	Best Fantasy Television series	Locke & Key	Nominated	
