= What's Up Warthogs! =

- Created by: Alex Díaz; Julie Sagalowsky Díaz
- Starring: Karissa Lee Staples; Tiago Abreu; Eduard Witzke; Ana Golja
- Theme music composer: Ian LeFeuvre; Marco Difelice
- Opening theme: "What's Up Warthogs Theme Song" performed by Ian LeFeuvre
- Composer: Peter Allen
- Country of origin: Canada
- Original language: English
- No. of seasons: 2
- No. of episodes: 40

Production
- Executive producers: Bill O'Dowd; Andrew Rosen; Dean Batali
- Production locations: Toronto, Ontario
- Camera setup: Multi-camera
- Running time: 22 minutes
- Production companies: Family Productions; Aircraft Pictures; Dolphin Entertainment

Original release
- Network: Family Channel
- Release: March 11, 2011 – May 18, 2012

What's Up Warthogs! is a Canadian sitcom that aired on Family Channel. It follows two teen rivals – Victoria and Eric – who with the help of best friend, Charlie, and crazed genius, Laney, come together and make the school morning announcements into a show. The show premiered on March 11, 2011 on Family Channel, and it was one of the first series shown on the launch of the Canadian version of Disney XD on June 1, 2011.

== Cast and characters ==
=== Main ===
- Karissa Lee Staples as Victoria Jagger
- Tiago Abreu as Eric Ortiz
- Eduard Witzke as Charlee McGuinness
- Ana Golja as Laney Nielsen

=== Recurring ===
- Duane Murray as Mr. Denovi
- Teresa Pavlinek as Ms. Stonebreaker

=== Special guest stars ===
- Connor Price as Teddy Chadwick IV
- Zak Long as Dex Kubrick
- David Fraser as Jerry the Janitor
- Argiris Karras as JJ Kay
- Michael Murphy as Freshman Newsie
- Amanda Joy Lim as Susie Kang
- Sidney Leeder as Cindy
- David Reale as Warty
- Aidan Shipley as Money Melvin
- Genevieve Kang as Kara Lee Burk
- Corrine Conley as Aunty
- Dylan Everett as Randy

== Episodes ==
=== Season 1 (2011) ===
No. overall	No. in season	Title	Original release date	Prod. code
1	1	"The Eric and Charlie Show"	March 11, 2011	101
2	2	"And That's What's Up"	March 18, 2011	102
3	3	"Weapons of Comedic Destruction"	March 25, 2011	103
4	4	"Erictoria"	April 1, 2011	104
5	5	"Out of Focus"	April 8, 2011	105
6	6	"Dex Kubrick"	April 15, 2011	106
7	7	"The Fall of Warty"	April 22, 2011	107
8	8	"The Meathead Incident"	April 29, 2011	108
9	9	"Trashbusters"	May 6, 2011	109
10	10	"Video Killed the Television Star"	May 13, 2011	110
11	11	"Who Wants to Take a Midterm?"	May 20, 2011	111
12	12	"Not on My... But!"	May 27, 2011	112
13	13	"Rumble in the Lab"	June 3, 2011	113
14	14	"In Sickness and in Health"	June 10, 2011	114
15	15	"Digital Detox"	June 17, 2011	115
16	16	"Kitchen Confidential"	June 24, 2011	116
17	17	"A Tale of Two Love Birds"	July 1, 2011	117
18	18	"Drama at West Hill"	July 8, 2011	118
19	19	"I'm a Runnin'"	July 15, 2011	119
20	20	"The Election"	July 22, 2011	120

=== Season 2 (2012) ===
No. overall	No. in season	Title	Original release date	Prod. code
21	1	"Inauguration Complication"	January 6, 2012	201
22	2	"An Officer and a Monkey"	January 13, 2012	206
23	3	"Taekwonzombie"	January 20, 2012	213
24	4	"The Show That Never Ends"	January 27, 2012	212
25	5	"To Teach His Own"	February 3, 2012	204
26	6	"For the Love of Licorice"	February 10, 2012	207
27	7	"Phantom of West Hill High"	February 17, 2012	209
28	8	"It Starts with We"	February 24, 2012	202
29	9	"Domo Arigato, Mr. McGuiness"	March 2, 2012	205
30	10	"Time Travelling with Flare"	March 9, 2012	208
31	11	"It Takes Two to Switcheroo"	March 16, 2012	218
32	12	"East Meets West"	March 23, 2012	219
33	13	"The Victator"	March 30, 2012	211
34	14	"Auntie Corporate"	April 6, 2012	215
35	15	"Save Mouse City"	April 13, 2012	217
36	16	"The Paperclip Principal"	April 20, 2012	214
37	17	"Prank You for Joking"	April 27, 2012	203
38	18	"Dissin' Cousins"	May 4, 2012	216
39	19	"Cruel Detentions"	May 11, 2012	210
40	20	"Split Down the Middle"	May 18, 2012	220

== International release ==
It premiered on Disney Channel UK as a sneak peek for the Summer of 2011 and made its full debut in November 2011.

Country	Title	Channel
UK	What's Up Warthogs!	Pop Girl
New Zealand	What's Up Warthogs	FOUR
Australia	What's Up Warthogs	ABC3
Brazil	É isso aí, Javali !	Gloob
United Arab Emirates	What's Up Warthogs!	e-Junior
Turkey	Haber Takımı	JOJO
