= Mairzee Almas =

Canadian television director

- Born: Vancouver, British Columbia, Canada
- Education: Vancouver Film School Sutherland Secondary School
- Occupation: Television director
- Years active: 1990–present
- Website: www.mairzeealmas.com

Mairzee Almas is a Canadian filmmaker and television director from Vancouver. She has directed numerous TV shows, including Shadow and Bone, Y The Last Man, The Sandman, Locke & Key, Outlander, Impulse, Jessica Jones and 12 Monkeys amongst many others. Her directing work encompasses SVOD, Cable and Network outlets. She was also the Co-Executive Producer/Director for the second season of Impulse. Mairzee began her career as an actress, having trained at F.T.S. Performing Arts Conservatory in Vancouver. She then trained at the Vancouver Film School – graduating from their Foundation Film Program. Over the next several years, she advanced to become a sought after First AD, working on numerous film and television projects. Her first directing opportunities came with episodes of Smallville and Da Vinci's Inquest. Since then, she has directed over 70 episodes of television and been nominated for multiple directing awards. She lives in Vancouver and works all around the world.

== Filmography ==
- Monarch: Legacy of Monsters
- Kaleidoscope
- The Sandman
- Locke & Key
- Y: The Last Man
- Shadow and Bone
- Outlander
- Jessica Jones
- Midnight, Texas
- Iron Fist
- Impulse
- Guilt
- Shadowhunters
- Ascension
- The 100
- Smallville
- Lost Girl
- Beauty & the Beast
- Being Human
- iZombie
- Alphas
- Haven
- Defiance
- Motive
- 12 Monkeys
- Supergirl
- Arrow
- Legends of Tomorrow
- Another Life
- Batwoman
