= Jumper: Griffin's Story (novel) =

2007 novel by Steven Gould

- First edition cover
- Author: Steven Gould
- Language: English
- Genre: Science fiction novel
- Publisher: Tor Books
- Publication date: August 21, 2007
- Publication place: United States
- Media type: Print (Paperback)
- Pages: 139 pp
- ISBN: 978-0-7653-1827-5
- OCLC: 122337975
- Dewey Decimal: 813/.54 22
- LC Class: PS3557.O8947 J86 2007
- Followed by: Griffin's Story video game Jumper

Jumper: Griffin's Story is a novel by Steven Gould released August 21, 2007, as a prequel to the film Jumper (2008). It follows the character Griffin as he deals with the death of his parents and the relentless pursuit of the Paladins through his adolescent and teenage years. The novel has no connection to the novels Jumper, Reflex, Impulse, or Exo, but rather more faithful to the movie.

== Development ==
Steven Gould wrote Jumper: Griffin's Story as a tie-in to the 2008 film Jumper, an adaptation of his novel of the same name. The novel, released on August 21, 2007, focuses on Griffin, an original character created by screenwriter David S. Goyer specifically for the film, and adapted from Goyer's script for the film. Because Griffin had not appeared in the two prior novels, Gould developed Jumper: Griffin's Story as a backstory of the character's early childhood before the film. When writing the novel, Gould had to work closely with a producer of the film to ensure that the story did not conflict with the film's premise.

== Video game ==
A video game loosely based on the novel and film, also titled Jumper: Griffin's Story, was released on February 12, 2008.
