= Impulse (TV series) =

2018 American science fiction drama series

- Genre: Drama; Science fiction
- Based on: Impulse by Steven Gould
- Developed by: Jeffrey Lieber
- Starring: Maddie Hasson; Sarah Desjardins; Enuka Okuma; Craig Arnold; Tanner Stine; Keegan-Michael Key; Missi Pyle; Daniel Maslany; Callum Keith Rennie
- Composer: Deru
- Country of origin: United States
- Original language: English
- No. of seasons: 2
- No. of episodes: 20

Production
- Executive producers: Gene Klein; Jeffrey Lieber; David Bartis; Doug Liman; Lauren LeFranc
- Producers: Kim Todd; Michael Pendell (pilot)
- Production locations: Hamilton, Ontario, Canada; Toronto, Ontario, Canada
- Cinematography: David Greene; Colin Hoult
- Editors: Tamara Luciana; Christopher S. Capp; Doc Crotzer
- Camera setup: Single-camera
- Running time: 44–59 minutes
- Production companies: Hypnotic; Universal Content Productions

Original release
- Network: YouTube Premium
- Release: June 6, 2018 – October 16, 2019

Impulse is an American science fiction drama television series based on the 2013 Steven Gould novel Impulse. The novel was one of a series following Gould's novel Jumper. The series is a stand-alone spin-off to the 2008 film adaptation of Jumper.

The series premiered on June 6, 2018, on YouTube Premium. Lauren LeFranc, Doug Liman, David Bartis, and Gene Klein served as executive producers. LeFranc also acted as showrunner for the series. In July 2018, the series was renewed for a second season consisting of ten episodes, which premiered on October 16, 2019. The series was canceled in March 2020.

== Premise ==
Impulse follows 16-year-old Henrietta "Henry" Coles who discovers she has the ability to teleport but has no control over her destination. The first time she realizes this, she is in a truck with her high school's basketball captain and star, Clay Boone, who tries to rape her. She has a seizure and teleports, in the course of which she inadvertently crushes much of his truck when her ability to teleport first manifests, leaving him a paraplegic. The show then explores Henry's feelings of fear regarding the assault, and the discovery that those feelings can trigger her ability to teleport.

== Cast and characters ==
=== Main ===
- Maddie Hasson as Henrietta "Henry" Coles, a teenage girl who possesses the ability to teleport, though has no control over her destination initially. She first realizes she has this capability while in the middle of being sexually assaulted. Her powers activate through emotional distress.
  - Carina Battrick portrays a younger Henry Coles in a supporting role.
- Sarah Desjardins as Jenna Faith Hope, Henry's soon-to-be stepsister and confidante. Initially cold and distant towards Henry, she becomes closer to her upon discovering that she was sexually assaulted.
- Enuka Okuma as Anna Hulce, a deputy sheriff in Reston, investigating the incident which left Clay Boone physically disabled for life via his legs
- Craig Arnold as Lucas Boone, a local mechanic, drug trafficker, and the eldest son of car and drug dealer Bill Boone
- Tanner Stine as Clay Boone, a star of the local basketball team and Bill Boone's youngest son. A classmate of Henry's, Clay develops an interest in her when she begins attending school.
- Keegan-Michael Key as Michael Pearce (season 1), (Note: Credited among the main cast in the pilot only) a scientist at a gravitational wave detector
- Missi Pyle as Cleo Coles, Henry's mother. She is living with and dating Thomas Hope.
- Daniel Maslany as Townes Linderman (season 2; recurring season 1), an autistic student at Reston High School who becomes close friends with Henry
- Callum Keith Rennie as Nikolai (season 2; recurring season 1), a master teleporter who was responsible for abducting Henry's father, Simon, ten years ago

=== Recurring ===
- Matt Gordon as Thomas Hope, Jenna's father. He and Cleo Coles live together with their daughters.
- David James Elliott as Bill Boone, a local car dealer who also traffics in drugs. He is Lucas and Clay's father and Cleo Cole's boss.
- Genevieve Kang as Patty Yang, a cheerleader at Reston High School and Clay's ex-girlfriend
- Gabriel Darku as Zach Jaymes
- Will Chase as Simon, Henry's father
- Aidan Devine as Sheriff Dale
- Shawn Doyle as Jeremiah Miller
- Tara Rosling as Esther Miller
- Gordon Harper as Amos Miller
- Dylan Trowbridge as Matthew
- Angel Giuffria as Zoe, Townes' online girlfriend
- Keon Alexander as Dominick, a Francophone who also possesses the ability to teleport long distances
- Raphael Bergeron-Lapointe as Tristan, Dominick's six-year-old son
- Rohan Mead as Jason Munther
- Geoffrey Pounsett as Deputy Gabriel
- Paula Boudreau as Nurse Mary
- Michael Reventar as Luis Castillo
- Rachel Wilson as Iris
- Alex Paxton-Beesley as Sabine, Dominick's wife and Tristan's mother
- Steve Fifield as Eddie Max
- Catherine Burdon as Eileen Paige, the principal of Reston High School
- Christina Collins as Gale
- Jamal Brown as Quinn
- Julia Knope as Brenda Gasser
- Sam Kantor as Damian
- Kristian Bruun as Sheldon Gibson
- Sandra Flores as Mrs. Gerhard
- Duane Murray as Sam
- Lauren Collins as Meghan Linderman
- Amadeus Serafini as Josh
- Billy Otis as Gil
- Kevin Hanchard as Jack Weakley, a doctor who treats Henry after she suffers a seizure
- Elisa Moolecherry as Nora Barnes
- Michelle Nolden as Wendy Jacobson, Bill Boone's estranged ex-wife and Lucas and Clay's mother
- Shohreh Aghdashloo as Fatima, a teleporter who can also stop time

=== Guest ===
- David Alpay as Daniel ("Treading Water")
- Lois Smith as Deidre Jones ("The Eagle and the Bee")
- Allison Hossack as Erica Wallace ("The Eagle and the Bee")
- Danny Pudi as Beanie ("They Know Not What They Do")
- Zack Pearlman as Glasses ("They Know Not What They Do")

== Episodes ==
Season	Episodes	Originally released
1	10	June 6, 2018
2	10	October 16, 2019

=== Season 1 (2018) ===
No. overall	No. in season	Title	Directed by	Written by	Original release date
1	1	"Pilot"	Doug Liman	Story by : Jeffrey Lieber; Teleplay by : Jeffrey Lieber & Jason Horwitch & Gary Spinelli	June 6, 2018
Two men fight in a subway, teleporting between there and the arctic before one man is trapped in the latter. Henrietta "Henry" Coles lives with her mother, Cleo, her mother's boyfriend, Thomas, and his daughter Jenna. She has a strained relationship with them and frequently graffitis the town. During class, she suffers a seizure that causes the classroom to shake. Later, she is caught graffitiing and is forced to pay a fine, causing Thomas to sell her car. She has a classmate, Clay, retrieve her car for her, as it is in his family's lot. They go to his car where he sexually assaults her. Panicking, she has another seizure and ends up in her room with part of Clay's car. She tells Jenna and they find Clay, call 911 and return home. Clay survives but is permanently paralyzed as a result. Thomas finds part of Clay's car in Henry's room but lies to Deputy Anne Hulce when she inquires about Henry's 911 call, stating Henry had been home all night. Clay's brother Lucas confronts Henry, driving her and Jenna off the road before kidnapping Henry and taking her to the family garage, but she subconsciously teleports home.
2	2	"State of Mind"	Alex Kalymnios	Lauren LeFranc	June 6, 2018
Two men fight on a rooftop, resulting in another man being pushed off. One of the men returns home to his wife and young son before they teleport due to the son's "magic trick". Henry is in her bedroom after being taken by Lucas and attempts to explain what happened to Jenna. Lucas explains to his father what happened, but his father is convinced the Millers, from Canada, attacked Clay. On the way to an appointment, Henry gets flashbacks of her assault. The doctor explains to Henry that she has a condition that can explain her memory loss. She meets Thomas, who threw out the car parts and warns her about Clay's father. Hulce is stopped when looking further into Clay's accident. Henry goes and returns her car to the impound lot. At school, Henry's classmate Townes tries to convince her she has superpowers. Walking home, she runs into Bill, who takes her to the Millers and asks her to identify who attacked Clay. Cleo expresses to Thomas her worry over Henry's condition. Later, Jenna and Henry smoke weed and Jenna admits she wishes Clay were dead. Jenna tells Henry that Clay has woken up, and upon having a panic attack in the bathroom, teleports to her bedroom.
3	3	"Treading Water"	Ed Fraiman	Debra Fordham	June 6, 2018
Townes witnesses the aftermath of the incident with Henry in the bathroom. Cleo argues with both Henry, at home, and Thomas, at the bowling alley, about the night of the accident. At Townes house, Jenna and Henry meet with his sister Meghan before they theorize that Henry teleporting because of fear. To evoke fear, they have her jump off a cliff into a lake, but it fails. Jenna confronts Lucas and warns him to stay away from Henry. Learning Clay is paralyzed, Henry goes to the cliff and manages to teleport to her bedroom. Henry discovers Clay doesn't remember assaulting her, and tells him they were attacked. Townes finds a video of the man teleporting during the subway fight. Henry and her mother reconcile, and she discovers her father abandoned her at home as a child while Cleo was away. In her sleep, Henry teleports somewhere. Meanwhile, the body of one of the Millers is found. Elsewhere, Dominick, who teleported with his family, leaves his wife, Sabine, and son, to ask a friend, Sam, about a device that stops him from teleporting. He learns it had a tracking device on it and when he returns home he finds Sabine dead and his son taken.
4	4	"Vita/Mors"	Mark Tonderai	John McCutcheon	June 6, 2018
Henry wakes up in an unknown place, but is able to teleport back to her room. Hulce and her partner alert the Millers that their son, Amos, overdosed and died. Henry tells Jenna about teleporting in her sleep, but she seems uninterested. Bill gives Cleo a job interview at his garage. Henry tells Townes about teleporting in her sleep and asks him to watch her in case she does it again, which she does before returning again. After, Henry argues with Townes, causing him to leave. Out shopping, Jenna tells Cleo that this was the day her mother was diagnosed with Alzheimer's. Hulce discovers the Boones are smuggling drugs to the Millers. Jenna criticizes Henry for pushing her mother away and only thinking of herself. Bill offers Cleo a job. Henry is about to tell her mother about Clay until she finds out that she got a job working for Bill Boone. Henry teleports once more, and starts to believe she's in a childhood home. Dominick finds his son but is unable to teleport with him. A man, Nikolai, asks him to surrender. However, knowing his son would be experimented on, Dominick kills them both. Meanwhile, Hulce is held at gunpoint in her car.
5	5	"The Eagle and the Bee"	Helen Shaver	Matt Pitts	June 6, 2018
Nikolai kills a man at his motel before running off. Meanwhile, Henry believes she's in a childhood home and convinces the owner she was hired by her daughter to help her. Jeremiah talks to Bill about the death of his son, and asks for help in getting his body. Hulce discovers she was taken by the DEA who asks them to step away from the Miller/Boone case. Jenna is invited by classmate Zach to join him as they pull a prank on another school. Cleo gets advice from Lucas after a hard first day. Officer Dale insists to Hulce that the case is closed. Henry has memories of her long-lost father Simon, and asks the owner about the house and discovers her parents used to live there. Lucas goes and visits his mother and they argue about each others absences. During the prank, Jenna and Zach hide from security where they kiss and they almost have sex. In a flashback it's revealed Lucas killed the Miller's son. Jenna watches Meghan and her girlfriend at the bowling alley. Henry is picked up and taken home, while Nikolai is alerted to another case. Meanwhile, Hulce is haunted by a former case.
6	6	"In Memoriam"	Valerie Weiss	Michael Bhim & Clare McQuillan	June 6, 2018
Townes starts a relationship with a girl he met online who promises to come to an award ceremony. Henry is dropped at home by her ex-boyfriend, Josh. Jenna, also being presented the award, discourages Henry from attending because Clay is due to be honored. Henry questions Jenna's friendship with Zach and warns her about him. Amo's mother goes to Hulce and insists his bible was stolen. Henry and Josh almost have sex in his car, but she has a flashback to the assault. Bill discovers Jeremiah has a new distributor. When Townes misses the ceremony, Jenna accepts the award instead. Henry discovers Townes missed the ceremony because his girlfriend didn't show up. Josh admits he misses Henry and they have sex, but has a panic attack afterwards. Clay discovers his team is retiring his jersey number. Josh tries to convince Henry to run away with him, but she refuses. Zach and Jenna have sex. Cleo takes Hulce to Boone Motors where she finds her sneaking in the cabinets. Townes and his girlfriend make up. Henry tells Clay that he assaulted her, but he says she wanted it. She tells him she caused his paralysis and that she's glad.
7	7	"He Said, She Said"	Maggie Kiley	Torrey Speer	June 6, 2018
Hulce investigates a rock thrown through Clay's, but he denies knowing who threw it. Afterwards, he throws a party at his house. Clay asks his ex, Patty, if she ever felt pressured into sex when they were dating. Lucas shows Clay what happened to their cars, and admits he believes Henry. Nikolai appears in Boone Motors, and talks to Clay about the accident. After breaking Clay's window, Henry's picked up by Hulce and recognizes a photo of Amos in her car. She tells her mother about the window and intends on apologizing to Bill. Jenna tells Henry about Zach, and admits she doesn't think he's the right person. Henry apologizes about breaking the window and tells him she recognized Amos but Bill tells her to let it go. Cleo invites Bill and his sons over for dinner. Henry shows Hulce a recording of her encounter with Bill. During the dinner, Hulce sneaks into the Bill's house at the same time Jeremiah does, both looking for the diary. Henry tells Lucas about Clay and her lie about the Millers. While having a panic attack, Henry begins to tell her mother what Clay did before having a seizure.
8	8	"Awakening"	Rebecca Johnson	Lauren LeFranc & Debra Fordham	June 6, 2018
In her mind and dream-like state, Henry sees Jenna getting assaulted by Zach. Lucas gets into an argument with Clay and Billy and reveals that Clay tried to rape Henry. It's revealed that Henry is having a non-convulsive seizure whilst unconscious. Jenna calls Townes about what happened and they decide to find her father. Cleo's ex-boyfriends appear to Henry, all unconcerned. She then sees a younger version of herself at school. Meanwhile, Clay and his father talk about Henry and he states he doesn't know what happened. Jenna tells Cleo about Henry's assault. Henry is blamed by Lucas for Amo's death and encouraged by Townes to slay the monster. Hulce tells the DEA about Jeremiah and the Boones. It's revealed Hulce' defended her former partner, a white cop, for shooting a black kid. Henry sees a memory of her and her father and sees Nikolai taking him. Cleo goes to Bill's Motor's where she angrily runs into Lucas. Returning home, Jenna finds Nikolai in Henry's room. Meanwhile, Henry beats up Clay in anger, thinking he's the monster, but discovers it's herself. Waking up, she teleports to her bedroom and stops Nikolai from attacking Jenna, who stabs him before he teleports before collapsing.
9	9	"They Know Not What They Do"	Cherien Dabis	Lauren LeFranc & Matt Pitts	June 6, 2018
Two men who apparently know about Nikolai's identity wander through the woods he teleported to and find him there unconscious. Henry and Jenna are freaking out over how to explain what happened and Henry yells at Jenna for telling Cleo about Clay. A furious Cleo confronts Bill and walks right into his meeting with the Millers which was infiltrated by the DEA. The Millers did not come for business but to confront Bill about Amos' murder. It is revealed to everyone that Henry lied and Cleo finds herself in the middle of a shooting during which Lucas manages to escape in a car with her. After the shooting we learn that Bill was working with the DEA for the whole time. In the car, Lucas talks to a clearly frightened Cleo about how he feels about his family and about what he has done to Amos. He then gives her the car and Cleo leaves him behind. Meanwhile the Miller's set fire to the Boone's house, where Jenna and Henry arrive, looking for Cleo. Henry runs into the burning building but only finds Clay. After a short moment of hesitation, she decides to help him and figures the only way to save them both is to teleport out of the house, as the flames are spreading quickly. She then teleports with him to her bedroom.
10	10	"New Beginnings"	Mairzee Almas	Lauren LeFranc	June 6, 2018
Clay is shocked and furious when he realizes that Henry was responsible for his injury, threatening her. In response, Henry tells him no one is going to believe him and that he is all alone. Then Townes shows up who was informed by Jenna. She and Townes take Clay to the hospital. In the car the three fight, meanwhile Henry makes up with her mother. Even though Bill is released by the police, his business is shut down, leaving both Thomas and Cleo without a job. Clay is visited by his mother in the hospital and he decides he's gonna live with her, which upsets Bill. The next day at school Jenna and Henry share a joint, discussing their fear of Nikolai. In the evening, the patchwork family bonds over playing bowling and dinner. Townes asks Jenna to come over to present his research regarding the man in the youtube video. Suddenly he gets hacked, the video is deleted and a message appears on the screen: "If I can find you, they can too." After Hulce pays a visit to the Millers, it is revealed that Lucas is with them. Bill begins to believe that Henry indeed could have powers. When he threatens her and her mother, Henry teleports along with his arm to an unknown place, which could be the hiding place of her father. She jumps in front of a train to trigger teleporting back home. She cannot find her mother, just a blood trail out of the house, where Nikolai awaits her.

=== Season 2 (2019) ===
No. overall	No. in season	Title	Directed by	Written by	Original release date
11	1	"Mind on Fire"	Doug Liman	Lauren LeFranc	October 16, 2019
Outside Henry's home, Nikolai witnesses Bill's attack and Henry ripping away his arm when she teleports by instinct. Bill dies from the damage and Nikolai begins disposing of Bill's corpse. Henry returns and confronts him, but Nikolai takes Henry and her injured mother in Bill's car, abandoning them outside of town with a cover story. Henry, terrified her mother could die, manages to teleport to a nearby diner to get help. In the hospital, Henry talks to Hulce, who tries to make sense of her story. Jenna and Henry stay with Townes as Henry's home is still a crime scene, and Henry tells them that Bill is dead. Henry tries coping with the trauma by going to a party and getting drunk and hallucinating. Townes receives a package at his house. In a dream, Henry discovers a photo of her family at a camp in the woods; her father then appears, telling her she needs to find him. She wakes up in her bedroom, having teleported in her sleep again. Hulce, who came to inspect the crime scene, hears noise upstairs but before she finds her, Nikolai appears and teleports Henry away with him.
12	2	"Fight or Flight"	Mairzee Almas	John McCutcheon	October 16, 2019
13	3	"For Those Lost"	Alex Kalymnios	Nikole Beckwith	October 16, 2019
Henry is in the woods again, where she had seen her father. She comes to a meadow with a blue truck, which starts to crumble; she tries to run, but is pulled towards it until she teleports back to her room, covered in mud. Thomas suggests he and Cleo marry to cover the insurance costs of the medical treatment she needed after Bill shot her. Henry meets with Nikolai again; he shows her a photo of the place she teleported to after Bill's attack, Sri Lanka. Henry wants to find out more about her father and goes on a trip with her mother to retrieve a box with some of her father's belongings from a friend of Cleo's. Hulce keeps investigating Bill and then sees someone unknown teleport when she stops to help a person lying in the middle of the road. Mrs. Miller introduces Lucas to the whole congregation and he starts to work with them.
14	4	"The Moroi"	Jill Robertson	Vladimir Cvetko	October 16, 2019
During the Romanian Revolution, a young Nikolai teleports out of a church before it is bombed. His parents and younger brother are killed and he moves in with his uncle, using his teleportation powers to steal. During a robbery, he meets Wesley, a Canadian citizen left to die and brings him back to his uncle's place. Wesley mentions he has a wealthy father who was smuggling him out, and Nikolai and his uncle can come at a price. Nikolai steals more to raise enough, but when they only have enough for two, the uncle suggests they go and leave Wesley. When Nikolai refuses, his uncle says they will find another way, but ends up trying to leave without them both. Nikolai finds him before he leaves, paying for himself and Wesley and leaving the uncle behind. However, the convoy is captured by Romanian soldiers and the escapees are executed. Nikolai teleports Wesley back home, but his uncle shoots and kills him. Angered, Nikolai bludgeons his uncle to death. In 1990, Nikolai arrives in Canada to his friend's father, who offers his home and to help him find others to understand his power. In the present, it is revealed that the father, now dying, set up the organization now hunting and experimenting on teleporters.
15	5	"Crossing the Threshold"	Sydney Freeland	Candice Philpot	October 16, 2019
Henry and Nikolai continue to practice controlling her emotions at the crash site. Henry, now working at a pizza parlor, talks to a fellow employee. Cleo and Thomas get into a fight about Henry's future before Thomas starts a new plowing job. Cleo takes one of Henry's joints and later smokes it with Thomas to make up for their fight. Townes and Jenna go to her college and stay with Townes' sister. While Jenna and Townes' sister attend a party, Townes secretly meets with the hacker, Dominick's friend from Season 1, who tells Townes that Nikolai is dangerous. Sheriff Hulce tries to reconcile with Mrs. Dale, but it fails and she is removed as Sheriff. As she leaves, a plaque honoring the late Sheriff Dale is placed on the wall, which she initially declined to put up due to Sheriff Dale's involvement with the Millers. Now able to control her emotions, Henry teleports Nikolai and Clay's truck to a field on her own.
16	6	"Seven of Hearts"	Julian Holmes	Jamie King	October 16, 2019
In Norway, Nikolai attempts to capture Simon, but he escapes. A teleporter named Fatima meets him in his apartment. Simon asks Fatima to join him in going public, but Fatima tells Simon to keep his distance from Henry. Thomas reveals he intends to marry Cleo to Henry and Jenna, which upsets Jenna. Hulce confronts Cleo about Bill Boone's blood in her house. Henry discovers she teleported to Cedar Creek, where they used to camp as a family. When Henry asks Cleo about it, Cleo asks if Bill Boone hurt her, and the two fight. Cleo later apologizes. Henry dreams about her father again at the campsite but teleports to a shack. Cleo confronts Clay's mother about Clay's assault. Lucas develops feelings for a Mennonite girl, but her father does not approve. Henry tells Jenna what happened and wants help from Townes, but Jenna tells Henry about Townes' encounter with the hacker and that Nikolai killed Dominick. Henry wants to meet the hacker, but Townes is at his therapist. Henry and Jenna go up to Townes' room and they are contacted by the hacker, who says he has information on Simon but wants to be teleported off the grid. Hulce plays a recording of Nikolai admitting to murdering Sam. When Henry confronts Nikolai, he teleports her to a room that looks like her, where the secret organization plans to experiment on her. Nikolai tells her this to earn her trust and says that he intends to stop the organization. Henry teleports to the shack in Cedar Creek, leaving a playing card for her father.
17	7	"The End of the World"	Alexis Ostrander	Lara Shapiro	October 16, 2019
In a flashback, Elaine is performing a piano rehearsal when her father and Nikolai leave to find a teleporter in Mexico City. Elaine ditches the rehearsal and goes with them. Present day, Nikolai tells Elaine that Henry will be ready for a presentation the following day, but urges her not to rush it. Townes resigns as Henry's sidekick and gives her all his research. Hulce provides the new sheriff with her recording of Nikolai, but he erases the recording. She later has a hallucination at the morgue while in uniform and is arrested. Jenna breaks up with Zack before prom and goes with Henry instead. Townes tells his girlfriend that he suspended his MMORPG account but does not break up with her. Henry goes back to the Romanian diner they went to searching for Nikolai and the waitress shows a photo of Nikolai and his family. Townes finally meets Zoe at prom, wearing a Naruto headband. It is revealed she has a mechanical arm. Nikolai confronts his adopted father about Elaine before murdering him. He then tells Elaine that the testing is done. Clay tells Lucas that Henry saved him from the fire. Lucas confronts Henry and tells her that she is an angel and that he must protect her.
18	8	"The Tether"	Mairzee Almas	John McCutcheon & Nikole Beckwith	October 16, 2019
Cleo has a panic attack while job hunting. She tries to get her job back at the diner but is told they replaced her. Lucas thanks Cleo for helping him be a better man. Cleo cries as she officially is divorced from Simon. Henry has a panic attack at work and teleports home. Townes receives a video from Sam with a location for his research on teleporter, which he retrieves. Townes then films his own video in case he is killed addressed to Jenna and Henry. The sheriff arrives at the house to ask more about Bill Boone, but is kicked out when they don't have a warrant. Nikolai robs his handlers of Factor. Henry asks Lucas to tell the sheriff that he see his father, but he confesses to murdering him. Jenna discovers she's failing her classes, which she blames on Henry. The family get into a fight.
19	9	"A Moment of Clarity"	Mark Tonderai	Vladimir Cvetko & Alex Eldridge	October 16, 2019
Thomas breaks up with Cleo and she and Henry move into a new house. Henry finds a Cedar Creek postcard in her locker. Clay tells Hulce about Henry's teleportation. When Hulce confronts Henry about this, Henry teleports her to a waterfall and leaves, promising to come back for her. Henry tries to reach out to Nikolai. Elaine gives Nikolai the last Factor, saying that she destroyed the rest. Townes shows Henry a video of young Nikolai being interviewed by his adopted father. Henry tries to teleport Hulce's car but fails, instead dumping it in the lake. Nikolai gets a voicemail from Henry and he texts back. Simon tells Fatima he is going after "them" and tells her that he left something for her at Cedar Creek, but Fatima tells him he's on his own. Jenna finds Hulce's cell phone in her barn.
20	10	"Making Amends"	Maggie Kiley	Lauren LeFranc	October 16, 2019
Nikolai tells Henry that he killed her father and shows her the card she left in the shack. Nikolai reveals her father was not a teleporter and intended to expose them. The two engage in a teleporting battle, ending in the destroyed Romanian church. When Nikolai tries to take Factor, Henry takes the vial and breaks it, causing Nikolai to tear apart and disintegrate. Henry finds Nikolai's phone and calls Elaine to tell her that Nikolai is dead. Jenna takes Hulce's phone to Townes. Henry reveals to Townes and Jenna that Nikolai killed her father, that she killed Nikolai, teleported Hulce, and knew about Nikolai killing Sam. She tries to take Hulce's phone but Townes uses the sonic device to stop her. Henry teleports back to the waterfall but Hulce is not there. Clay's mother reveals she was raped, which angers Clay. He later overhears his mom talking to her husband, calling Clay a rapist. Henry visits Lucas in jail. Townes tells Zoe about Henry and asks her to help him find Hulce. Henry tells Cleo that Simon is dead, before getting into an argument and blaming Cleo for her sexual assault. Henry leaves, saying she never wants to see her mom again. Henry teleports to a European city where she is confronted by Fatima, who stops time and reveals she was the one communicating with Henry.

== Production ==
=== Development ===
On December 15, 2016, YouTube commissioned a television pilot titled Impulse from a script by Jeffrey Lieber, with revisions by Gary Spinelli, loosely based on the novel by Steven Gould. It was to be produced by the production companies Hypnotic and Universal Cable Productions with Doug Liman, David Bartis, and Gene Klein of Hypnotic reported to be executive producers. Liman was also expected to direct the pilot as well.

On June 27, 2017, YouTube gave the production a series order with a premiere tentatively set for 2018. On January 13, 2018, producer and writer Lauren LeFranc joined the series in the position of showrunner and executive producer. On May 10, 2018, YouTube Red released the first official trailer and set the series premiere for June 6, 2018.

On July 19, 2018, the series was renewed for a second season consisting of ten episodes, which premiered on October 16, 2019. On March 10, 2020, it was announced that the series had been canceled.

=== Casting ===
Simultaneously with the announcement of the pilot order, it was confirmed that Maddie Hasson, Sarah Desjardins, Missi Pyle, Enuka Okuma, and Craig Arnold had been cast as series regulars. In addition, it was reported that David James Elliott would appear in the series in a main role.

=== Filming ===
Production for the pilot began in Toronto, Ontario, Canada on December 16, 2016. Filming continued in the Cayuga community in Haldimand County, Ontario at locations including Cayuga Secondary School, the Cayuga Administration Building, Haldimand Motors, Toronto Motorsports Park, a resident's farm, as well as many other facilities. On January 13, 2017, the production filmed an accident scene on Kohler Road in Cayuga. On October 13, 2017, filming for a portion of the rest of the series took place in the Carlisle community of Hamilton, Ontario. Filming for the second season took place from February 21 to June 14, 2019, in Toronto.

== Release ==
=== Marketing ===
On March 24, 2018, the show hosted a panel at the annual WonderCon fan convention in Anaheim, California. It was moderated by IGN's Laura Prudom and featured executive producers Liman and Gene Klein, showrunner Lauren LeFranc and actors Maddie Hasson, Missi Pyle, and Daniel Maslany. On May 30, 2018, YouTube made the first episode available to those owning a Google Assistant. From June 5–7, 2018, YouTube employed the use of viral marketing with the assistance of popular YouTube creators Kendall Rae, Karina Garcia, Cam's Creations, Nichole Jacklyne, Ayydubs, and Jacksfilms. During the span of those days, the content creators embedded footage of Keon Alexander's character Dominick from the series teleporting into and out of their videos.

=== Premiere ===
On June 7, 2018, the series held its official premiere at the Roxy Cinema in New York City. The premiere included a screening followed by a question and answer session featuring executive producer Doug Liman and lead actress Maddie Hasson.

== Reception ==
The first season was met with a positive response from critics upon its premiere. On the review aggregation website Rotten Tomatoes, the first season holds a 100% approval rating with an average rating of 6.70 out of 10 based on 9 reviews.
