= Reflex (novel) =

2005 novel by Steven Gould

- Hardcover edition
- Author: Steven Gould
- Language: English
- Genre: Science fiction novel
- Publisher: Tor Books
- Publication date: August, 2005
- Publication place: United States
- Media type: Print (hardback)
- Pages: 384 pp
- ISBN: 0-3128-6421-3 (hardback edition); ISBN 978-0-8125-7854-6 (paperback)
- Dewey Decimal: 813/.54 22
- LC Class: PS3557.O8947 R45 2004
- Preceded by: Jumper
- Followed by: Impulse

Reflex is the 2004 sequel to the 1992 novel Jumper by Steven Gould.

== Synopsis ==
Set 10 years after the conclusion of Jumper, David Rice, a young adult man with the rare spatial ability to teleport both short and long distances, has married Millie and occasionally works for the National Security Agency, only accepting jobs that he finds to be morally acceptable. The novel tells the story from David's and Millie's perspectives in alternating chapters.

During a meeting with Brian Cox, his NSA handler, Brian is killed, and David is tranquilized and kidnapped by a powerful criminal organization with influence over the NSA and other government agencies. When David awakens, he is shackled to the wall of a windowless room at an undisclosed location. When he tries to "jump", the shackles pull him back violently from wherever he attempts to go.

Without David, Millie is stranded at their secret hideaway: a cliff-wall cave in a remote part of Texas. She uses a rope to descend from the cave entrance, but the rope's anchor breaks and she falls; that is when she first discovers that she has gained the ability to "jump".

David's captors have implanted him with a device that can trigger his vagus nerve, causing him to become violently ill. His shackles give him the run of the room, but at random intervals he is signaled to jump to a painted box on the floor in the center of the room, or else the device is triggered. The routine continues night and day.

Millie sets out to find and rescue David with help from members of the NSA and, later, the FBI.

David becomes so conditioned to the device that the shackles are removed. He can jump away, but anywhere away from the house, the device triggers immediately, and he instantly finds himself within the box on the floor. His captors take him on a field trip to test very sensitive equipment that can detect his jumps within a few hundred yards because of the change in mass.

David experiments with jumping away and returning immediately to the house. Trying to do it fast enough that the device isn't triggered, he learns to jump back and forth repeatedly, effectively remaining in mid-jump in two places at once. He uses this technique, which he calls "twinning", to communicate with Millie.

Millie tracks David to a house on the northeast coast of the United States, and by jumping, surveils the house.

One of David's captors, a beautiful woman named Hyacinth Pope, tempts him sexually, but he refuses. He later learns that this is considered a failure of the program. When he is given a package to deliver to a sensitive foreign location, he correctly deduces that it is a bomb, and that he is now considered expendable. Instead of delivering the package to its intended location, David jumps Ms. Pope to a remote location in the Texas desert. He then twins the package to a beach in Australia, which keeps it from going off because it is triggered by the loss of the signal from the house, the same as his implant. He briefly returns to the house, then returns to the beach to find a large crater where the bomb exploded.

Lawrence Simons interrogates David in the room. Millie arrives to rescue him, disguised as a maid. When David recognizes her, he twins between the ocean and the room, quickly flooding it with water. Simons is washed away in the flood. The floor collapses under the sudden weight, and the equipment controlling the implant shorts out. David collapses from the shock, still chained to the floor. Millie jumps to get a gun and shoots the chain to free him, and they escape.

The implant is going off continuously, which will kill David quickly unless it is removed in a risky operation, complicated by the fact that every time David is stressed, he jumps back to the box. Millie convinces the half-conscious David to resist that impulse, and the implant is successfully removed.

When David has recovered, he and Millie track the multi-story building where Lawrence Simons is working. They carefully block the roof drains, and then flood the roof, collapsing it and flooding the building. They capture Simons, but they find he has an implant similar to the one put in David. Hence, Simons is a lackey, not in charge. He manages to commit suicide before they can interrogate him.

In the aftermath, Millie and David return to their lives, despite the threat of this mysterious organization. Wanting to become a parent, Millie convinces David to have a child with her.

== Characters ==
- David Rice – Has the ability to "jump" instantaneously to any location that he can visualize accurately. Kidnapped and held captive throughout most of the story.
- Millie Harrison-Rice – David's wife. Gains her husband's ability early in the novel and uses it to track him down and rescue him.
- Brian Cox – David's connection to the NSA, who is murdered attempting to protect David from capture.
- Hyacinth Pope – Murderer of Brian Cox and primary tormentor of the captive David.
- Lawrence Simons – Owner of the house where David is held and important member of the organization behind his abduction. Superior to Hyacinth Pope.

== Film adaptation ==
A film based on the second book titled Reflex was the planned sequel to Jumper.

== Sequel ==
Gould wrote a 2008 short story, "Shade", that takes place after the events in Reflex and before the events in the 2013 novel Impulse. It was published on Tor Books' community website.

== See also ==
- Jumper: Griffin's Story
