= Jumper (novel) =

1992 science fiction novel by Steven Gould

- 1992, First Edition — Hardcover
- Author: Steven Gould
- Cover artist: Romas Kukalis, cover art
- Language: English
- Genre: Science fiction novel
- Publisher: Tor Books
- Publication date: August, 1992
- Publication place: United States
- Media type: Print (hardback)
- Pages: 344 pp
- ISBN: 0-8125-2237-0 (hardback edition)
- OCLC: 29012650
- Followed by: Reflex

Jumper is a 1992 science fiction novel by Steven Gould. The novel was published in mass market paperback in October 1993 and re‑released in February 2008 to coincide with the release of the film adaptation. It tells the story of David, a teenager who escapes an abusive household using his ability to teleport. As he tries to make his way in the world, he searches for his mother (who left when he was a child), develops a relationship with a woman from whom he keeps his ability secret, and is eventually brought into conflict with several antagonists.

== Plot ==
One evening, while being physically abused by his father, Carl, David "Davy" Rice unexpectedly teleports (or "jumps") and finds himself in the local library, the Stanville Library. This is a place that Davy is familiar with and spends a lot of time in, which is why he was able to teleport there easily. The origin of this power is never explained, but he ends up using this power continually throughout the novel. Vowing never to return to his father's house, Davy makes his way to New York City. After being mugged and discovering that he cannot get a job without a birth certificate or Social Security number, Davy robs a local bank by teleporting inside the safe, stealing nearly a million dollars. He then begins a life of reading, attending plays, and dining in fancy restaurants.

At a play, he meets a 21-year-old woman named Millie Harrison, and they spend some time touring New York before she returns to college in Stillwater, Oklahoma. Davy later visits her in Oklahoma, and they attend a party, where he accidentally runs into Millie's ex-boyfriend, Mark, who tries to fight him, forcing David to jump Mark away, unnoticed. Feeling bad for Davy, Millie invites him to stay the night at her place. The two officially start a romantic relationship and make love. Millie and Davy continue to see each other and begin to fall in love. Davy also manages to locate and reunite with his long-lost mother, Mary Niles. Mary left the family after being severely beaten by David's father, and Carl intercepted all her attempts to contact David over the years.

The NYPD starts investigating Davy after he saves a neighbor from an attack by jumping her abusive husband to a park; the husband turns out to be a police officer. The investigation drives Davy to move to Oklahoma, where he gets an apartment near Millie. One night, while Davy is out, the police are in his New York City apartment when Millie calls. The police informed her of their investigation into him. Davy confronts Millie and tries to explain, but Millie breaks up and tells him to go. Out of anger, Davy jumps in front of her and returns to his Stillwater apartment.

After a few weeks, Davy finds himself missing Millie and starts receiving letters from her, a way of reconciling.

Mary, who was on a business trip, is murdered by terrorists when her plane is hijacked. Davy sets out to find Rashid Matar, the terrorist responsible for his mother's death. Davy jumps to Algeria to search for Matar, having to dodge the police almost every time he is there. While at Mary's funeral, Davy meets his father for the first time in years and is interrogated by the police again. While searching for the terrorist, he and Millie go on their first date in months. Davy tells her everything, even the bank robbery, which she's a little upset about. Despite everything he has told her, his ability to jump and the money he stole, Millie confesses that she misses him and is deeply in love with him. Davy and Millie officially restart their relationship.

However, the NSA, led by veteran agent Brian Cox, becomes suspicious when it finds out Davy can get from Algeria to the USA in only a few hours. When questioned, Davy jumps out of the NSA office, witnessed by Cox and several other agents. Cox and the NSA become determined to capture Davy so they can use his powers. David has Millie stay with her parents while they secretly see each other. After numerous failures to grab Davy, Cox takes Millie hostage to get to him. Davy strikes back by grabbing Cox, and later captures Matar and Carl, thereby putting him in the unique position of controlling the fates of all three of his tormentors.

This experience has profound effects on all four of them. Davy finds himself unable to kill his captives despite their crimes against him and ultimately releases them. Davy turns Matar over to the authorities, threatening to come after him again if he is not found guilty of his crimes. Carl is forced to acknowledge his abuse of Davy and Mary and enters alcohol counseling. Cox is forced to see the similarities between his actions and those of the terrorist and the wife-beating alcoholic, has Millie released, and agrees to stop hunting Davy. Both Davy and Millie go away with each other.

Afterward, Millie comforts Davy as he realizes that he cannot escape his pain through teleportation or vigilante action, and he also enters counseling.

== Characters ==
- David "Davy" Rice – The protagonist of the story who discovers that he can "jump" to any place that he can clearly visualize in memory. David is the victim of an abusive father. He meets and falls in love with Millie.
- Millie Harrison – David's girlfriend, whom he met at a play in New York. She attends a university in Stillwater, Oklahoma. During her relationship with David, Millie falls in love with him.
- Mark Kobold – Millie's ex-boyfriend.
- Mary Niles – David's mother, who left the family four years prior to the start of the novel due to her husband's abusive behavior. She is killed by terrorists during a business trip.
- Carl Rice – David's abusive father. He abused his wife, Mary, and David to the point where they both left him.
- Brian Cox – An NSA agent who attempts to capture David after witnessing him jump, going as far as kidnapping Millie.
- Sergeant Washburn – An NYPD officer and an abusive husband. He tries to get David arrested after David jumps him away from his abused wife.
- Rashid Matar – A hijacker and terrorist. He was responsible for Mary Niles' death.

== Adaptation ==
A film by the same title, released on February 14, 2008, was directed by Doug Liman, with a screenplay adapted by David S. Goyer, Jim Uhls and Simon Kinberg. It starred Hayden Christensen, Samuel L. Jackson, Rachel Bilson, Jamie Bell, and Diane Lane. The beginning of the film follows the early plot of the novel with respect to David's home life and discovery of jumping, but deviates significantly from there. Most of the characters are presented differently than in the book, and the film introduces another Jumper, Griffin O'Conner. Also new are a group, the Paladins, who hunt and kill Jumpers on religious grounds; Cox's character, renamed Roland Cox, is not an NSA agent, but rather the leader of the Paladins.

A new novel was written as a tie-in to the film, titled Jumper: Griffin's Story. This book gives the backstory of the new character, and as noted in an introduction by the author, is not entirely consistent with the original Jumper or with Reflex.

A sequel TV series to the film based upon the novel Impulse was released on June 6, 2018, on Google's YouTube Premium subscription service. The second season renewal was announced shortly after the series' release. The series' third season was cancelled in March 2020.

== Awards and nominations ==
- Compton Crook Award Final Ballot (an award for first novels)
- Locus Award, second place, best first novel, 1992
- American Library Association, Best Book List, YA division
- International Teacher's Association's Recommended Reading List
- Pacific Northwest Reader's Association, YA Award Final Ballot

Jumper was number 94 on the American Library Association's 100 Most Frequently Challenged Books of 1990–1999. Gould said: "considering that it wasn't published until the latter half of 1992, it had to work extra hard." The book was listed for the graphic description of David's abuse at the start of the book (page 2) and the description of David's debate about killing his passed out father (page 10–11).

== Sequels ==
- A 2004 sequel to the novel, Reflex, continues the story of David and Millie as adults.
- The 2008 short story "Shade" takes place after the events in Reflex.
- A 2013 sequel, Impulse, tells the story of their daughter, Cent.
- Released September 9, 2014, Exo continues the series after Impulse and mainly follows Cent.
- The 2008 novel Jumper: Griffin's Story tells the tale of another "jumper" character from the film inspired by the novel, and serves as a prequel/spin-off. There is also a video game of the same name, which was released in 2008. Both titles take place in the film's world, and not that of the novels.

== See also ==
- Alfred Bester's 1956 novel The Stars My Destination
- Phyllis Eisenstein's 1978 novel Born to Exile
