= Impulse (Gould novel) =

2013 novel by Steven Gould

- Author: Steven Gould
- Language: English
- Series: Jumper
- Genre: Science fiction novel
- Publisher: Tor Books
- Publication date: January 8, 2013
- Publication place: United States
- Media type: Print (hardcover) e-Book (Kindle); Audio Book (CD)
- Pages: 368 pp (Hardcover)
- ISBN: 0765327570
- Preceded by: Reflex
- Followed by: Exo

Impulse is a 2013 novel by Steven Gould, the third novel in the Jumper series and the fourth in the "Jumper" universe. The first two novels (Jumper and Reflex) tell a connecting story which is continued in Impulse. A sequel to Impulse, called Exo, was published on 9 September 2014.

== Plot ==
The protagonists of the previous novels, David (Davy) Rice and his wife Millicent (Millie) Harrison-Rice, now have a teenage daughter, called "Cent" after her mother. They have relocated to a remote opulent lodge-style home in the north of Canada, bought from a billionaire who lost his wealth in the dot com crash. Here they live in isolation, hiding from the people who took her father captive and tortured him to gain control over his innate teleportation abilities, and from the government agencies who want to use them for their own ends.

Cent decides that home schooling is stultifying and she wants a normal life with friends. When she triggers an avalanche while snowboarding without permission, she learns that she, like her parents, has the ability to jump, after she suddenly finds herself in her own bedroom. Her family relocates to a small town so that she can meet friends, but when they do, all three of them get wrapped up in a criminal conspiracy that grows larger as they investigate it. Cent learns to jump in place and add momentum/velocity as she arrives, resulting in the ability to throw herself into the air.

When Hyacinth Pope, from the group that has been trying to capture or kill David and his family, returns, she captures Cent, but Cent's innate ability to jump in place and add velocity allows her to escape.

== Television adaptation ==
A television series adaptation, titled Impulse, was released on YouTube Premium on June 6, 2018. However, it shares none of the characters, character names, settings, events, or themes, other than a fatherless teenage girl named Henrrietta Coles who can teleport and use telekinesis. It got canceled after its second season.

== Sequel ==
Exo was released on 9 September 2014. It continues the story 18 months after the events of Impulse. Exo mainly follows Cent as she continues to test the limits of her abilities.

== Jumping ==
It seems that the ability to teleport or jump can be learned. David was the first one and just did it, but Millie and Cent did it under stress after being jumped many times. In the sequels of the series the main characters discover different principles to their capabilities of jumping. In Jumper, David realizes that he is changing momentum when he jumps, both because he can jump off of a cliff and, after picking up great speed, he can jump to a perfect standstill. He also realizes that jumping is opening a hole between two places. In Reflex, he learns to jump back and forth between two places that it effectively keeps this hole open. In Impulse, Cent learns to jump and add momentum/velocity as she arrives, resulting in the ability to throw herself into the air.
