= Jump wire =

Electrical wire connecting circuit components without soldering

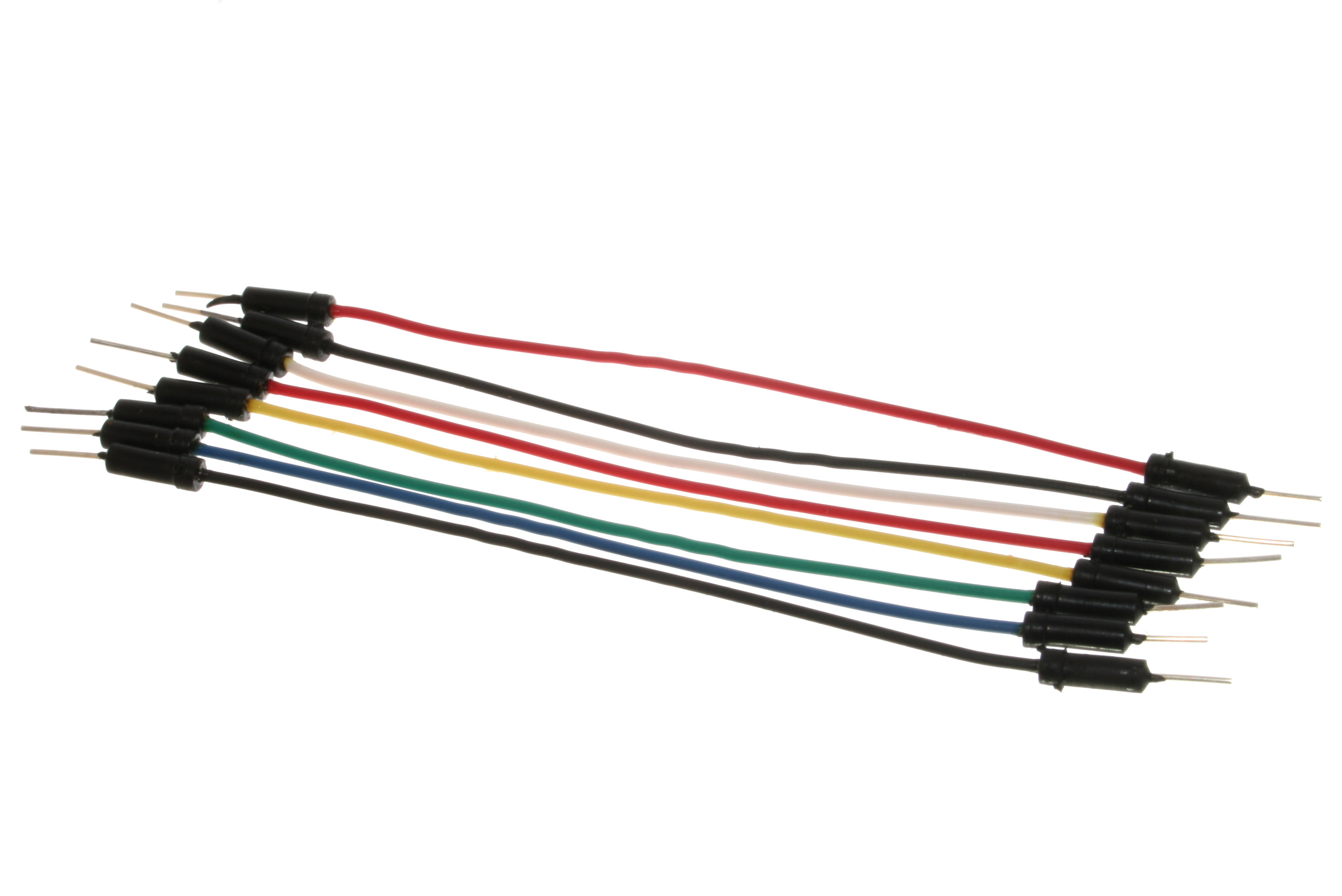
Stranded 22AWG jump wires with solid tips.

A jump wire (also known as jumper, jumper wire, DuPont wire) is an electrical wire, or group of them in a cable, with a connector or pin at each end (or sometimes without them – simply "tinned"), which is normally used to interconnect the components of a breadboard or other prototype or test circuit, internally or with other equipment or components, without soldering.

Individual jump wires are fitted by inserting their "end connectors" into the slots provided in a breadboard, the header connector of a circuit board, or a piece of test equipment.

== Types ==
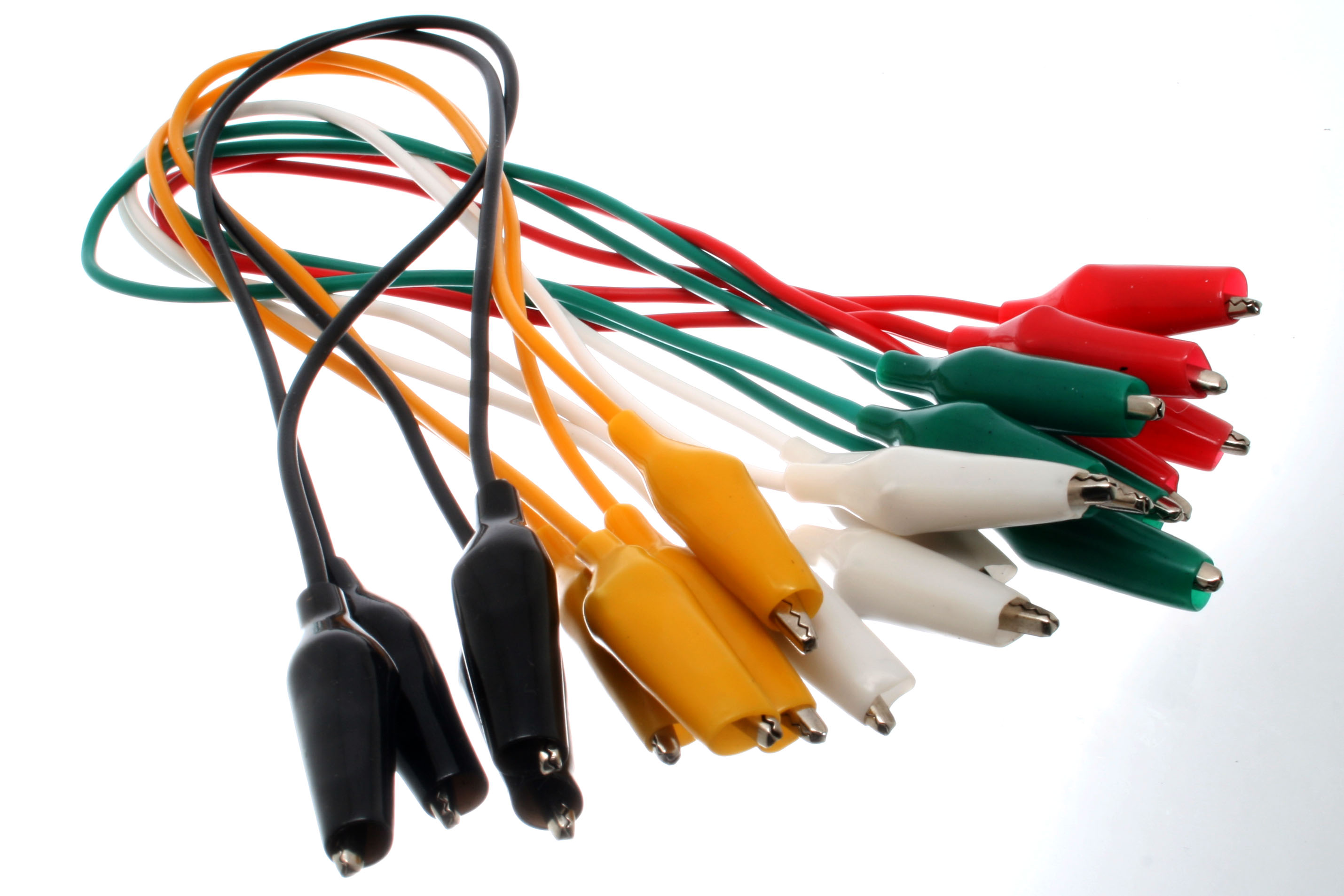
Jumper wires with crocodile clips

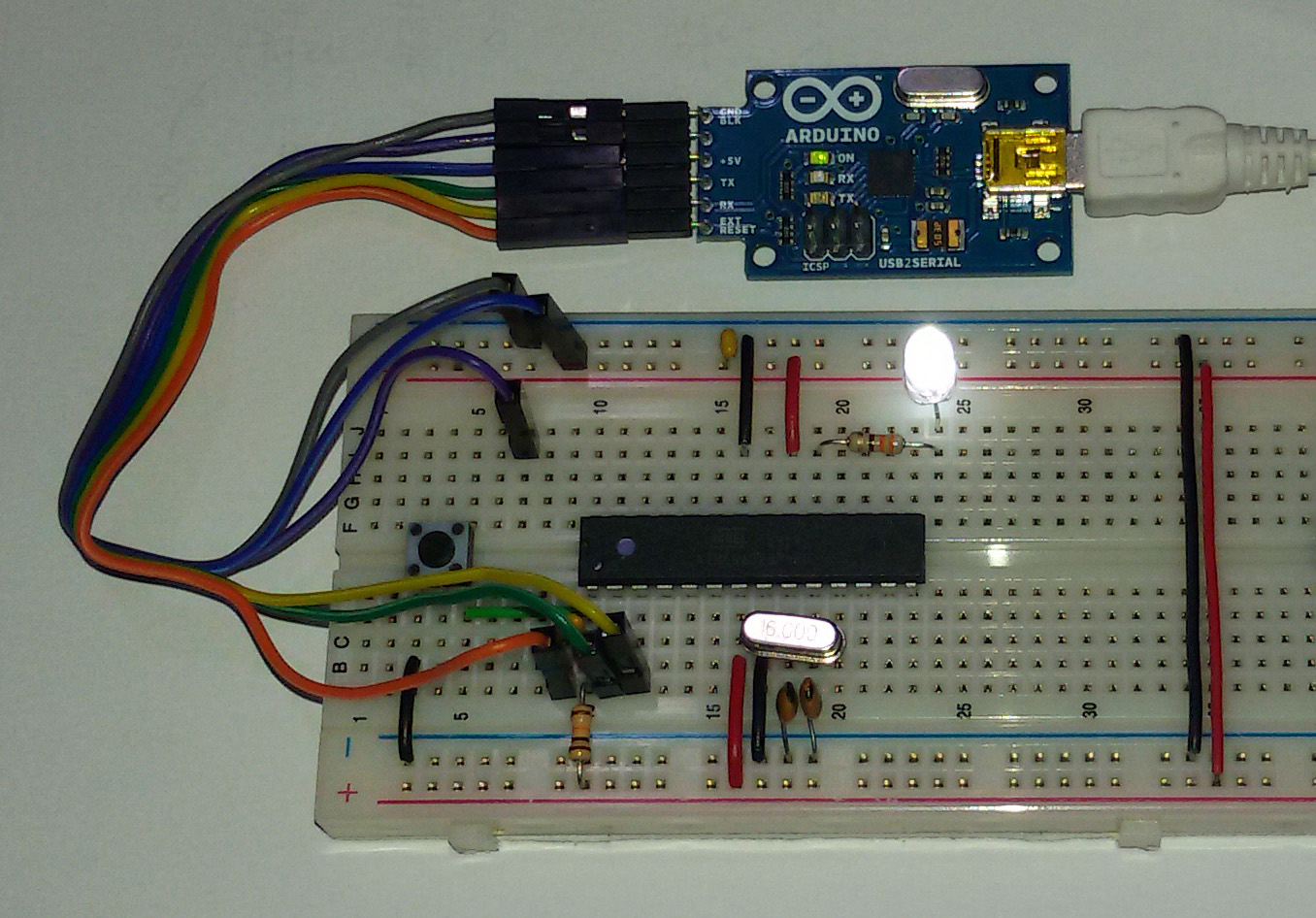
Jump wires at the end of a multi-colored ribbon cable are used to connect the pin header at the left side of a blue USB2Serial board to a white breadboard below. Another jumper cable ending in a USB micro male connector mates to the right side of the USB2Serial board. Red and black tinned jump wires can be seen on the breadboard.

There are different types of jumper wires. Some have the same type of electrical connector at both ends, while others have different connectors. Some common connectors are:

- Solid tips – are used to connect on/with a breadboard or female header connector. The arrangement of the elements and ease of insertion on a breadboard allows increasing the mounting density of both components and jump wires without fear of short-circuits. The jump wires vary in size and colour to distinguish the different working signals.
- Crocodile clips – are used, among other applications, to temporarily bridge sensors, buttons and other elements of prototypes with components or equipment that have arbitrary connectors, wires, screw terminals, etc.
- Banana connectors – are commonly used on test equipment for DC and low-frequency AC signals.
- Registered jack (RJnn) – are commonly used in telephone (RJ11) and computer networking (RJ45).
- RCA connectors – are often used for audio, low-resolution composite video signals, or other low-frequency applications requiring a shielded cable.
- RF connectors – are used to carry radio frequency signals between circuits, test equipment, and antennas.
- RF jumper cables - Jumper cables is a smaller and more bendable corrugated cable which is used to connect antennas and other components to network cabling. Jumpers are also used in base stations to connect antennas to radio units. Usually the most bendable jumper cable diameter is 1/2".

== See also ==
- Jumper (computing)
- Pin header
