= Steven Gould =

American science fiction writer and teacher

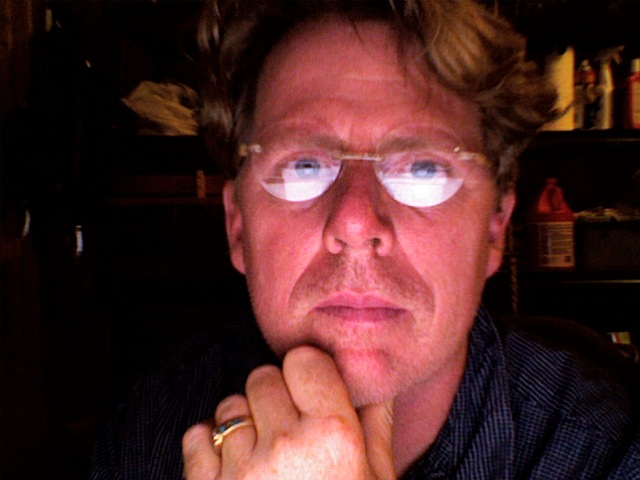
- Webcam self-portrait, 2006
- Born: February 7, 1955 (age 71); Fort Huachuca, Arizona, U.S.
- Education: Texas A&M University
- Occupation: Writer
- Spouse: Laura J. Mixon
- Children: 2
- Writing career
- Genre: Science fiction

Steven Charles Gould (born February 7, 1955) is an American science fiction writer. He has written ten novels. His 1992 novel Jumper was adapted into a film released in 2008.

== Biography ==
Steven Charles Gould was born in Fort Huachuca, Arizona, on February 7, 1955, to James Alan and Carita Louise Gould. His father was an Army officer; when Gould was in junior high his father was stationed at Fort Shafter in Hawaii for three years. The whole family learned to scuba dive there, and Gould went diving frequently.

Gould attended Texas A&M University and has set much of his writing in Texas. Aggiecon, which is held in College Station on the Texas A&M campus, was the first science fiction convention Gould attended, and he was chair of Aggiecon V in 1975.

Gould submitted the first short story he wrote to Analog; it was rejected with a personal note from then-editor Ben Bova, who encouraged Gould to let him see his future work. The second story Gould wrote, "The Touch of Their Eyes", was read aloud by Theodore Sturgeon at a writing workshop at AggieCon in 1979. Sturgeon made one correction ("Calvary and Cavalry are two different things") and suggested that Gould submit it to Stan Schmidt, who had become editor at Analog in late 1978. Gould did, and the story was published by Analog in 1980.

Gould was director of the south/central region of the Science Fiction and Fantasy Writers of America (SFWA) from 1986 to 1989. He was also a guest lecturer at Texas A&M in 1990. Gould was president of SFWA for two years through June 2015.

Gould practices and teaches aikido, which is featured prominently in his books 7th Sigma and Helm. The young protagonists of both books become proficient at the martial art and eventually embrace it as a full lifestyle. His scuba diving hobby informed scenes in his novels Greenwar and Blind Waves. Greenwar was a collaboration with his wife, Laura J. Mixon.

== Writing workshops ==
Gould has been an instructor at the annual one-week speculative fiction workshop Viable Paradise since 2000.

== Personal life ==
In 1989 Gould married Laura J. Mixon and moved with her to New York City, where her job supported them while he finished his first novel, Jumper. The couple currently live in Albuquerque, New Mexico. They have two daughters.

== Works ==
This list of works (data from ISFDB) covers Gould's novels, speculative fiction short fiction, and essays and includes general themes for each of the novels.

=== Novels ===
Jumper novels

- Jumper (Tor, 1992): A young man discovers he has the ability to teleport, and uses it to fight terrorists while evading government agents.
- Reflex (2004). A sequel to Jumper.
- Jumper: Griffin's Story (2007): A novel detailing the back story of a character in the 2008 film adaptation of Jumper
- Impulse (Tor, 2013). Another sequel to Jumper, it was adapted into a TV series in 2018
- Exo (Tor-Forge, 2014). Another entry in the Jumper series.

Other novels

- Wildside (Tor, 1996): A group of Texas high school graduates find a hole into a pristine parallel world unspoiled by man and human-instigated extinctions. They start a gold business and are discovered by the government.
- Greenwar (Forge, 1997; Tor, 1998) with Laura J. Mixon. The plot deals with deep sea energy and environmental issues
- Helm (Tor, 1998): A novel concerning mind control and the destruction of Earth's ecosystem
- Blind Waves (Tor, 2000): A novel concerning melted icecaps, investigation into violence against refugees out at sea and in a floating city; set in Texas
- 7th Sigma (2011): A novel set in an American Southwest ravaged by insect-sized metal-eating, self-replicating robots. It takes place in the same world as Gould's short stories "Bugs in the Arroyo", "A Story, with Beans" and "Rust with Wings".

=== Short fiction ===
- "The Touch of Their Eyes" (Analog Science Fact & Fiction, Sep 1980)
- "Wind Instrument" (Asimov's, Jun 1981)
- "Gift of Fire" (Analog, Aug 1981)
- "Rory" (Analog, 1984)
- "Mental Blocks" (Amazing Stories, Jul 1985)
- "The No License Needed, Fun to Drive, Built Easily with Ordinary Tools, Revolutionary, Guaranteed, Lawnmower Engine Powered, Low Cost, Compact, and Dependable Mail Order Device" (Analog, Apr 1986)
- "Poppa Was a Catcher" (New Destinies, Volume II, ed. Jim Baen, Aug 1987; Cities in Space, ed. Jerry Pournelle, John F. Carr, Sep 1991)
- "Peaches for Mad Molly" (Analog, Feb 1988; The Year's Best Science Fiction: Sixth Annual Collection, ed. Gardner Dozois, May 1989; The 1989 Annual World's Best SF, ed. Donald A. Wollheim, Arthur W. Saha, Jun 1989; New Skies: An Anthology of Today's Science Fiction, ed. Patrick Nielsen Hayden, Sep 2003)
- "Simulation Six" (Asimov's, Mar 1990)
- "The Session" (The Armless Maiden: And Other Tales for Childhood's Survivors, ed. Terri Windling, Tor Apr 1995)
- "Leonardo's Hands", with Rory Harper (RevolutionSF, Aug 2005)
- "Shade" (Tor.com, 2008) - Side story to Reflex
- "Bugs in the Arroyo" (Tor.com, Apr 2009)
- "A Story, with Beans" (Analog, May 2009; The Year's Best Science Fiction: Twenty-Seventh Annual Collection, ed. Gardner Dozois, Jul 2010, The Mammoth Book of Best New Science Fiction: 23rd Annual Collection, 2010)
- "Tameshigiri" (The Living Dead 2, John Joseph Adams. Night Shade Books, 2010)
- "Rust with Wings" (After: Nineteen Stories of Apocalypse and Dystopia, 2012)

=== Essays ===
- Introduction (A Conflagration Artist, a collection by Bradley Denton) (Wildside Press, 1994)

== Awards ==
Gould's short fiction has been nominated twice for the Hugo Award, for the short story "Rory" in 1985, and the novelette "Peaches for Mad Molly" in 1989. "Peaches for Mad Molly" was also on the shortlist for the Nebula Award that year. His first published short story, "The Touch of Their Eyes", was also nominated for the Analog Award for Best Short Story in 1980.

Gould's first novel, Jumper, was nominated for the Compton Crook Award (Balticon - Best 1st Novel) and came in second for the Locus Award for Best First Novel.

Gould's second book, Wildside, was awarded the Hal Clement Award for best young adult science fiction novel in 1997. The National Library Association has also recognized Jumper and Wildside as best books for young adults.
