= Jumper (2008 film) =

Film directed by Doug Liman

- Theatrical release poster
- Directed by: Doug Liman
- Screenplay by: David S. Goyer; Jim Uhls; Simon Kinberg
- Based on: Jumper by Steven Gould
- Produced by: Arnon Milchan; Lucas Foster; Jay Sanders; Simon Kinberg
- Starring: Hayden Christensen; Jamie Bell; Rachel Bilson; Michael Rooker; AnnaSophia Robb; Max Thieriot; Diane Lane; Samuel L. Jackson
- Cinematography: Barry Peterson
- Edited by: Saar Klein; Don Zimmerman; Dean Zimmerman
- Music by: John Powell
- Production companies: 20th Century Fox; Regency Enterprises; New Regency Productions; Hypnotic Productions; Dune Entertainment
- Distributed by: 20th Century Fox
- Release date: February 14, 2008
- Running time: 88 minutes
- Country: United States
- Language: English
- Budget: $85 million
- Box office: $225.1 million

Jumper is a 2008 American science fiction action film directed by Doug Liman, and written by David S. Goyer, Jim Uhls and Simon Kinberg. Loosely based on the 1992 novel by Steven Gould, the film stars Hayden Christensen as a young man capable of teleporting, as he is pursued by a secret society intent on killing him. Jamie Bell, Rachel Bilson, Max Thieriot, AnnaSophia Robb, Diane Lane, Tom Hulce, Kristen Stewart, Michael Rooker, and Samuel L. Jackson also star.

The script went through a rewrite prior to filming, and the roles for the main characters were changed during production. Filmed in 20 cities and 14 countries from 2007 to 2008 and released on February 14, 2008, the film grossed $225 million worldwide and received generally negative reviews from critics, mostly because of the many changes to Gould's novel, rushed plot, and anticlimactic ending.

== Plot ==
After falling into the Huron River, 15-year-old David Rice discovers that he can teleport, or 'jump'. He escapes his abusive father, William, and moves to New York City, where he robs banks by jumping into their vaults.

Eight years later, David follows a luxurious, hedonistic lifestyle. He is confronted by Roland, leader of the Paladins—a religious organization that believe Jumpers are unholy abominations to mankind and should be eradicated, while believing that only God should possess such power. Roland began investigating the impossible heist 8 years prior and tracked down David. Despite Roland's specialized equipment that disrupt a Jumper's abilities, David manages to escape by jumping to his childhood bedroom in his hometown of Ann Arbor, Michigan. David reconnects with his childhood crush Millie, and runs into a former bully, Mark. While in a bar fight with Mark, David jumps them both into a bank vault, leaving him and jumping back to the bar. Mark is arrested and Roland later questions Mark.

Meanwhile, David charms Millie into traveling to Rome. When the guards at the Colosseum turn them away, David and Millie managed to sneak in to a secret location. As they were touring the inside of the Colosseum, David jumped into the Gladiator pit where he encounters Griffin O'Connor, another Jumper who has been following him since London, and are ambushed by Paladins. Griffin curtly warns David about the Paladins' crusade, that there were others like them, and teleports away. David later finds himself with Griffin at his desert safehouse. Griffin has been tracking and hunting Paladins. David returns back to the Colosseum and attempts to flee with Millie, only to be betrayed by the tour guide and arrested.

At the police station, David's mother, Mary, shows up out of the blue and helps him escape before the Paladins arrive. Millie starts to become suspicious of David as she is brought to the airport to be flown back. Roland arrives at David's childhood home under the guise of an IRS agent to interrogate William and discovers photos of Mary, during which Roland severely injures William to near death. David later returns to his childhood home to find his father incapacitated and jumps him to a hospital in an effort to save him. David then breaks into Mark's jail cell to demand answers about Roland.

David returns to Griffin's hideaway to convince him to partner up to kill Roland and keep Millie safe, during which he enters Griffin's 'jump scar', a short-lived wormhole that Jumpers create with their ability, and follows him to Tokyo where he presses Griffin for a yes. Griffin agrees and they jump to the airport to discover that Millie already arrived an hour prior. David catches up to Millie in her apartment and reveals the truth about his 'wealth', as well as his powers. When the Paladins arrive, he jumps her to Griffin's lair. Using a machine to keep David's jump scars open, Roland's team invades Griffin's lair and a chaotic fight ensues. Griffin and David fight off the group. Griffin steals their machine, but the Paladins manage to capture Millie.

David wants to save Millie, but Griffin has instead prepared a bomb, counting on Roland having set up an ambush in Millie's apartment. David, desperate to save Millie, steals the detonator and teleports away. He and Griffin engage in a lengthy battle that ends with them jumping to a Chechen battlefield, where David traps Griffin in tangled high-voltage wires, which disrupt his ability.

As David returns to Ann Arbor to rescue Millie, the Paladins ambush David and connect him to a wall in Millie's apartment. Unable to teleport just himself away, David jumps the whole apartment with Millie and the Paladins into the Huron River, then into the public library. After getting Millie to safety, David jumps Roland to the Grand Canyon, choosing to leave him alive with a warning instead of killing him. Later, David tracks down Mary, who is revealed to be a high-ranking Paladin and has been protecting him by hiding his information from her colleagues, while discovering he has a half-sister. He bids her farewell, and then jumps away with Millie.

== Cast ==
- Hayden Christensen as David Rice, a young man who discovers the genetic spatial ability to "jump" over short and long distances enshrouded by thin, black smoke. He also is a latent telekinetic, an additional hereditary ability that activates whenever he is stressed and can't jump.
  - Max Thieriot as 15-year-old Davy Rice
  - Ryan Grantham as 5-year-old Davy Rice
- Rachel Bilson as Millie Harris, David's love interest.
  - AnnaSophia Robb as Young Millie Harris
- Samuel L. Jackson as Roland Cox, the current leader of the Paladins group.
- Jamie Bell as Griffin O'Connor, a renegade Jumper.
- Diane Lane as Mary Rice, David's long-lost mother.
- Teddy Dunn as Mark Kobold, David's childhood bully.
  - Jesse James as Young Mark Kobold
- Michael Rooker as William Rice, David's abusive father.
- Kristen Stewart as Sophie, David's younger half-sister.
- Tom Hulce as Mr. Bowker
- Barbara Garrick as Ellen

== Production ==
=== Script and storyboards ===
In November 2005, New Regency Productions hired director Doug Liman to helm the film adaptation of the science fiction novel Jumper by Steven Gould. Screenwriter Jim Uhls was hired to rewrite an adapted screenplay by David S. Goyer. However, Liman desired another rewrite and Simon Kinberg assisted in completing the script. Liman said about using the novel for developing the script: "This is 100% Steven Gould's story, it's just reinvented as a movie." In an interview, Gould revealed that he approved of the deviations from the novel. Before filming was to begin, the studio announced plans to develop a trilogy based on the novel's premise.

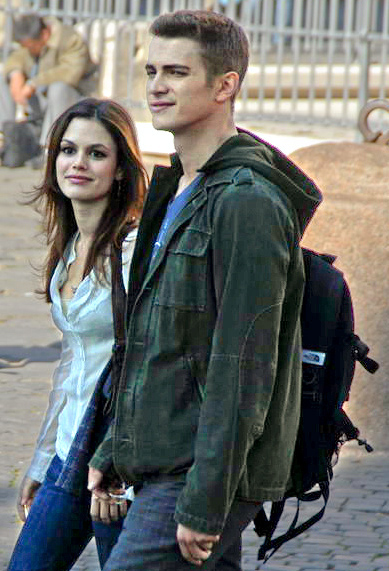
Rachel Bilson and Hayden Christensen filming in Rome in November 2006

While other films tend to use only one storyboard artist, Jumper required six, who each worked on an individual action sequence. The artists were given specific instructions on the rules of the teleportation used in the film, to ensure accuracy in the storyboarding. One of them, Rob McCallum, reflected on the instructions: "I was just thinking, 'How would a guy that can teleport fight?' So you were really pushing yourself to try to think of inventive, cool, spectacular ways that you could use this jumping talent that these characters have."

=== Casting ===
In April 2006, actors Tom Sturridge, Teresa Palmer, and Jamie Bell were cast for Jumper with Sturridge in the lead role. The following July, actor Samuel L. Jackson was cast as Roland Cox, with producer Simon Kinberg rewriting the original screenplay draft by Goyer. Principal photography was scheduled to take place in Tokyo, Rome, Toronto, and New York. Production was stopped in June 2006 after executive Tom Rothman told Liman "The lead is 18. Wouldn't the movie be better if he were 25? You have a huge movie here and adults won't go and see an 18-year-old. They'll consider it a children's movie. You could make a bigger movie than that." Liman agreed on casting older actors for furthering the romantic aspect of the film. In August, actor Hayden Christensen replaced Sturridge in the lead role as David just two weeks before the beginning of shooting, as the studio "became concerned about not having a more prominent actor in their trio of young stars." The studio would also push for Liman to cast rapper Eminem in the role, but Liman insisted on casting Christensen. After Christensen was recast for the lead role, Liman replaced Palmer with Rachel Bilson.

=== Filming ===
We'd walk in at dawn with the sun coming up so Doug could get the light he wanted, and it was just beautiful, not a soul in there.

— Hayden Christensen, reflecting on filming in the Colosseum

In September 2006, Jumper was filmed at various locations in Peterborough, Ontario and principal photography began in Toronto in October. In December 2006, Liman negotiated with the Rome Film Commission for rare access to film for three days in the Colosseum. The scene in the Colosseum was originally written for the Pantheon, where exterior shots were also filmed. The crew was required to keep equipment off the ground by using harnesses and had to rely on natural light for filming. Filming took place for 45 minutes in the morning and in the evening so as not to disturb the public touring the amphitheater throughout the day. In order to maximize the short period for filming, four steadicams were set up to ensure time was not wasted in reloading the camera. A visual effects supervisor explained how visual effects were needed for various aspects after filming: "There were three kinds of shots: there were shots where they were able to get most of what they needed in the Collosseum [sic] itself; and then there were shots on a set that needed extensions beyond the limits of the set; and then there were shots where we needed to create the Coliseum basically from scratch." After filming in Rome, scenes were filmed in Toronto during December 2006 to January 2007 and wrapped at the Canadian location on January 19.

On January 26 in Toronto, 56-year-old David Ritchie, a set dresser, was fatally struck by frozen debris while dismantling an outdoor set in wintry conditions. Another worker was injured and was sent to a hospital with serious head and shoulder injuries. After Toronto, the cast and crew traveled to Tokyo to film scenes. One scene required over 30 shoots as the scene could only be filmed in between traffic light changes. As a result of director Liman insisting Christensen perform his own stunts, the actor injured his hand, split open his ear, and developed a hyperdilated pupil that required hospital care while filming various scenes. In February 2007, the next filming site was set up at Gallup Park in Ann Arbor, Michigan. Sixty students from the nearby Huron High School were cast as extras for the film. Since additional filming was required of the area, twenty other students were used for a day of filming in September. Altogether, filming took place in 20 cities in 14 countries.

=== Visual effects ===
The New Zealand visual effects studio Weta Digital was initially selected to assist in creating a preview clip for the 2007 Comic-Con Convention. The studio's 100 employees later developed the visual effects for 300 of the 600 shots in the film. In total, there are more than 100 jumps in the film, and each jump was modified based on the distance and location the character(s) jumped. The jumps were developed using Nuke and Shake software; many, including those to Big Ben and the Sphinx were created with Maya. Weta's VFX supervisor Erik Winquist explained how the visual effects of the jumps were created: "The concept of what a jump looks like changed and evolved a little for post-production. There are shots in the film that use still array footage but not in the same way that we saw in The Matrix. The Matrix was largely about stopping time whereas this was about using slow shutter speeds on those still array cameras to end up with a streaky motion-blurred image as the perspective was changing, which is a pretty interesting look." Other visual effects studios that assisted with the film include Hydraulx, Digital Domain, and Pixel Magic. Lightwave 3D was also used for some of the movie's scenes.

== Release ==
Jumper was released on February 14, 2008, by 20th Century Fox.

== Reception ==
=== Critical response ===
On the review aggregator website Rotten Tomatoes, 15% of 169 critics' reviews are positive, with an average rating of 4/10. The website's consensus reads: "Featuring uninvolving characters and loose narrative, Jumper is an erratic action pic with little coherence and lackluster special effects." Metacritic, which uses a weighted average, assigned the film a score of 35 out of 100, based on 36 critics, indicating "generally unfavorable" reviews. Audiences polled by CinemaScore gave the film an average grade of "B" on an A+ to F scale.

Austin Chronicle's Marc Salov called the film "... pretty slick, entertaining stuff, well-crafted by Liman, edited into a tight, action-packed bundle of nerviness". Empire had a verdict of "[Doug] Liman's least charismatic action movie and the least developed, but it still packs some cracking action into its brief running time and lays foundations on which a great franchise could be built".

Australian film reviewer David Stratton stated that "this film represents a new [watershed] in the history of the cinema because it's got no plot, it's got no characters, it's got no action scene that makes any kind of sense", and awarded it half a star out of five.

The film was nominated for Best Science Fiction Film and Best Music at the Saturn Awards losing to both Iron Man and The Dark Knight respectively.

=== Box office ===
The film was released on February 14, 2008 in the United States and Canada, in the hopes of pulling in business on Valentine's Day. The film was targeted at an audience of both males and females below the age of 25. Jumper grossed $27.3 million on 4,600 screens in 3,428 theaters from Friday to Sunday, ranking first for the weekend at the box office. In its first weekend, the film set the record for the largest February release in South Korea and had the first place position in 11 of the 30 markets it was released in. For the first two weekends of its release, the film maintained its number one position in international markets, while slipping to the second position in the United States to the release of Vantage Point. The film's worldwide gross is $221,231,186 with $80,172,128 from the box office in the United States and Canada and $142,059,058 from other territories. It was the 28th highest-grossing film worldwide for 2008.

== Soundtrack ==
The score for the film was released on February 19, 2008, after the film's release in theaters. The tracks were all written by John Powell. It marks as the third collaboration between Liman and Powell, following The Bourne Identity (2002) and Mr. & Mrs. Smith (2005). The music was conducted by Brett Weymark and performed by the Sydney Symphony Orchestra.

== Home media ==
The film was released on DVD and Blu-ray Disc in North America on June 10, 2008 and internationally on June 16. Special features include a commentary, deleted scenes, an animated graphic novel, featurettes, and a digital copy allowing consumers to watch the film on portable devices.

=== Video game ===
A video game titled Jumper: Griffin's Story was made for the Xbox 360, PlayStation 2, and Wii consoles. The storyline focuses on the character Griffin as he attempts to avenge the death of his parents. Nicholas Longano of the video game publisher Brash Entertainment stated, "From the very first script read, we knew this had to be made into a game. The teleportation elements make for some very compelling gameplay." The game was released on February 12, 2008, two days before the film's wide release. GameRankings gave the Xbox 360 version of the game a 28% positive rating, based on 12 reviews. The PlayStation 2 version received a 35% positive rating while the Wii version had a 23% positive rating. Daemon Hatfield of IGN reviewed the Xbox 360 version and gave it a negative review: "Low production values, monotonous gameplay, and lackluster visuals make this a story you can jump past."

=== Novel tie-ins ===
Steven Gould, the author of Jumper and Reflex also wrote Jumper: Griffin's Story as a tie-in for the film. The novel, released on August 21, 2007, focuses on the character Griffin which was created by screenwriter David S. Goyer specifically for the film. Because Griffin had not appeared in the two prior novels, Gould developed Jumper: Griffin's Story as a backstory of the character's early childhood before the film. When writing the novel, Gould had to work closely with a producer of the film to ensure that the story did not conflict with the film's premise.

Oni Press released a graphic novel, Jumper: Jumpscars, that portrays several backstories related to the film. The novel was released on February 13, 2008, one day before the film's wide release. A publisher for Oni Press commented on the tie-in to the film, stating: "The world that was being built around these characters was so well-realized and the mythology so interesting that other stories about this conflict would be plentiful and add to what the filmmakers were building." The novel was written by Nunzio DeFilippis and Christina Weir and illustrated by Brian Hurtt.

In November 2016, the re-illustrated covers of the Skulduggery Pleasant novel series by Derek Landy, done by Tom Percival to commend the series' 10th anniversary, had its characters modelled off of real-life celebrity figures, with "the last teleporter" Fletcher Renn on the cover of The Faceless Ones visually based on promotional stills of Hayden Christensen as David Rice from Jumper.

== Potential sequel ==
Author Steven Gould's second novel in the Jumper series, Reflex, was published in 2004 (by 2014, two more Gould novels in the series have been published).

Prior to the film's 2008 release, Hayden Christensen reflected on the possibility of one or more sequels: "This has definitely been set up in a way that will allow for more films, and Doug has been careful to make sure that he's created characters that will have room to grow." Lucas Foster during production of the film stated in an interview: "The ideas got so large, that they really couldn't fit into, you know, one or two movies, they needed to evolve over at least three movies. So we planned the story out over three movies and then we sliced it up in such a way as to leave room for the other two movies."

In response to the film's box office performance, director Doug Liman has spoken of his ideas for a sequel. Among them are that Jumpers can reach other planets and travel in time, as well as their capacity for espionage. He has also stated that Rachel Bilson's character would learn how to jump (hinted by David falling unconscious before the jump from the river to the library), just as in Gould's sequel, Reflex. However, as of 2026, no further updates were given for a sequel.

== Television series ==
A spin-off television series from the film, titled Impulse, was released on YouTube Premium on June 6, 2018.
