= Tall Girl =

- Official poster
- Directed by: Nzingha Stewart
- Written by: Sam Wolfson
- Produced by: McG; Mary Viola; Corey Marsh
- Starring: Ava Michelle; Griffin Gluck; Sabrina Carpenter; Paris Berelc; Luke Eisner; Clara Wilsey; Anjelika Washington; Rico Paris; Angela Kinsey; Steve Zahn
- Cinematography: Eric Edwards
- Edited by: Priscilla Nedd Friendly
- Music by: Mateo Messina
- Production company: Wonderland Sound and Vision
- Distributed by: Netflix
- Release date: September 13, 2019 (United States)
- Running time: 102 minutes
- Country: United States
- Language: English
- Budget: $13.6 million

Tall Girl is a 2019 American teen romantic comedy film directed by Nzingha Stewart, from a screenplay by Sam Wolfson. The film stars Ava Michelle, Griffin Gluck, Sabrina Carpenter, Luke Eisner, Paris Berelc, Clara Wilsey, Anjelika Washington, Rico Paris, Angela Kinsey, and Steve Zahn.

The film was released by Netflix on September 13, 2019, and received mixed reviews. It later got a sequel released in February 2022.

== Plot ==
Jodi Kreyman is a 16-year-old who has been tall for her age since she was three, which has made her insecure her whole life. Students regularly joke about her height. In contrast, Jodi's older sister Harper is of short height and has won multiple beauty pageants. Jack Dunkleman, a life-long friend, frequently asks her out, but she is reluctant, partly because he is much shorter than she is.

Stig Mohlin, a Swedish foreign exchange student, joins Jodi's class, and she is immediately interested in him, along with most girls in the school. However, her bully, Kimmy Stitcher, starts showing him around. Dunkleman is distressed to learn that Stig will be staying at his house as the host family. Jodi asks Harper for help getting Stig to notice her, so she and their mother give her a complete makeover.

Kimmy and another bully, Schnipper, prank call Jodi, pretending to be Stig and asking her to homecoming. To her best friend Fareeda's frustration, Jodi hides in the bathroom to avoid Kimmy. Stumbling across Stig playing the piano, he encourages her to join him, and they sing the duet "I've Never Been in Love Before" from the musical Guys and Dolls.

Jodi finds her father has organized a tall people club meeting in their house, which she finds upsetting. Stig calls, and at first, thinking it is another prank call, she tells him off, but he invites her to watch a musical. She turns up to Dunkleman's house, and he becomes jealous when he realizes she is there to see Stig. He continually interrupts their evening, but as Stig escorts Jodi home, they kiss. Later, feeling guilty, Stig asks Dunkleman for advice, and he tells him to focus on being with Kimmy. Jodi gets angry at Dunkleman when she learns this.

Meanwhile, another girl—Liz—asks Dunkleman on a date. Schnipper is now interested in Jodi, so he gets Kimmy to ask her to join them for an escape room activity; Jodi ditches a concert with Fareeda to go. In the escape room, they kiss in couples: Jodi and Schnipper, Kimmy and Stig, and Dunkleman and Liz, until Jodi gets frustrated and leaves. Jealous, Stig talks to Jodi and agrees to go on a date to Harper's pageant competition. Harper wins, but Stig does not turn up. At Dunkleman's party, Stig explains that he lost track of time.

Dunkleman rejects Liz when she asks him to the homecoming dance. He gives Jodi platform heels to apologize for being a bad friend. Jodi is sent a video from after she left the party. Stig pretended that Jodi had an unrequited love for him and says he stood her up. Schnipper joined the conversation and a fistfight ensued, leaving Dunkleman with a black eye.

At the homecoming dance, Kimmy and Stig are crowned Homecoming Queen and King, but he breaks up with her. Jodi arrives in the high heels Dunkleman gave her and makes a speech expressing newfound confidence in herself. Stig asks Jodi out, but she rejects him. She talks to Dunkleman and he finally reveals why he always carries a milk crate: he stands on it and leans in to kiss her.

== Cast ==
- Ava Michelle as Jodi Kreyman, a very tall, self-conscious 16-year-old
- Griffin Gluck as Jack Dunkleman, Jodi's love interest
- Sabrina Carpenter as Harper Kreyman, Jodi's sister
- Luke Eisner as Stig Mohlin, a Swedish exchange student
- Clara Wilsey as Kimmy Stitcher, the most popular girl at school who bullies Jodi
- Paris Berelc as Liz, a friend of Kimmy's
- Rico Paris as Schnipper, who has also tormented Jodi for years
- Anjelika Washington as Fareeda Marks, Jodi's best friend
- Angela Kinsey as Helaine Kreyman, Harper and Jodi's mother
- Steve Zahn as Richie Kreyman, Harper and Jodi's father
- Milena Rivero as 10-year-old Kimmy Stitcher
- Bria Condon as Crystal Spitz
- Shane Guilbeau as Bob Brickman
- Christina Moses as Nina Dunkleman, Jack's mother
- Andrew Brodeur as Will
- Jason Rogel as Dr. Seeger
- Gralen Bryant Banks as Principal O'Sullivan
- Kelly Murtagh as Ms. Novey
- Chima Chekwa as Maison Voodoo Presenter
- Kerry Cahill as Gina, a Tip Toppers member

== Production ==
In November 2018, it was announced that Netflix would collaborate with McG of Wonderland Sound and Vision for a fourth time on the film Tall Girl, with Nzingha Stewart set as the director. In January 2019, Ava Michelle, Griffin Gluck, Luke Eisner, Sabrina Carpenter, Paris Berelc, Steve Zahn, Angela Kinsey, Anjelika Washington, Clara Wilsey, and Rico Paris joined the cast of the film.

Principal photography on the film began in January 2019 in New Orleans and ended in March 2019.

== Release ==
The film was premiered on September 9, 2019. The film was released on September 13, 2019. On October 17, 2019, Netflix announced that the film had been viewed by over 41 million viewers after its release on their platform.

== Reception ==
On review aggregator website Rotten Tomatoes, the film holds an approval rating of 42% based on 12 reviews, and an average rating of 5.3/10. The site's critics consensus reads, "While charming at times, Tall Girl is mostly an uninspired teen comedy that fails to bring anything new to the genre."

== Sequel ==
On December 1, 2020, DiscussingFilm reported that Tall Girl 2 was in the works at Netflix, with Michelle returning as Jodi alongside the majority of the supporting cast. Filming began in April 2021, with Sam Wolfson returning as the screenplay writer. Tall Girl 2 was eventually released on February 11, 2022.

== See also ==
- Heightism
