= Bryan Greenberg =

American actor (born 1978)

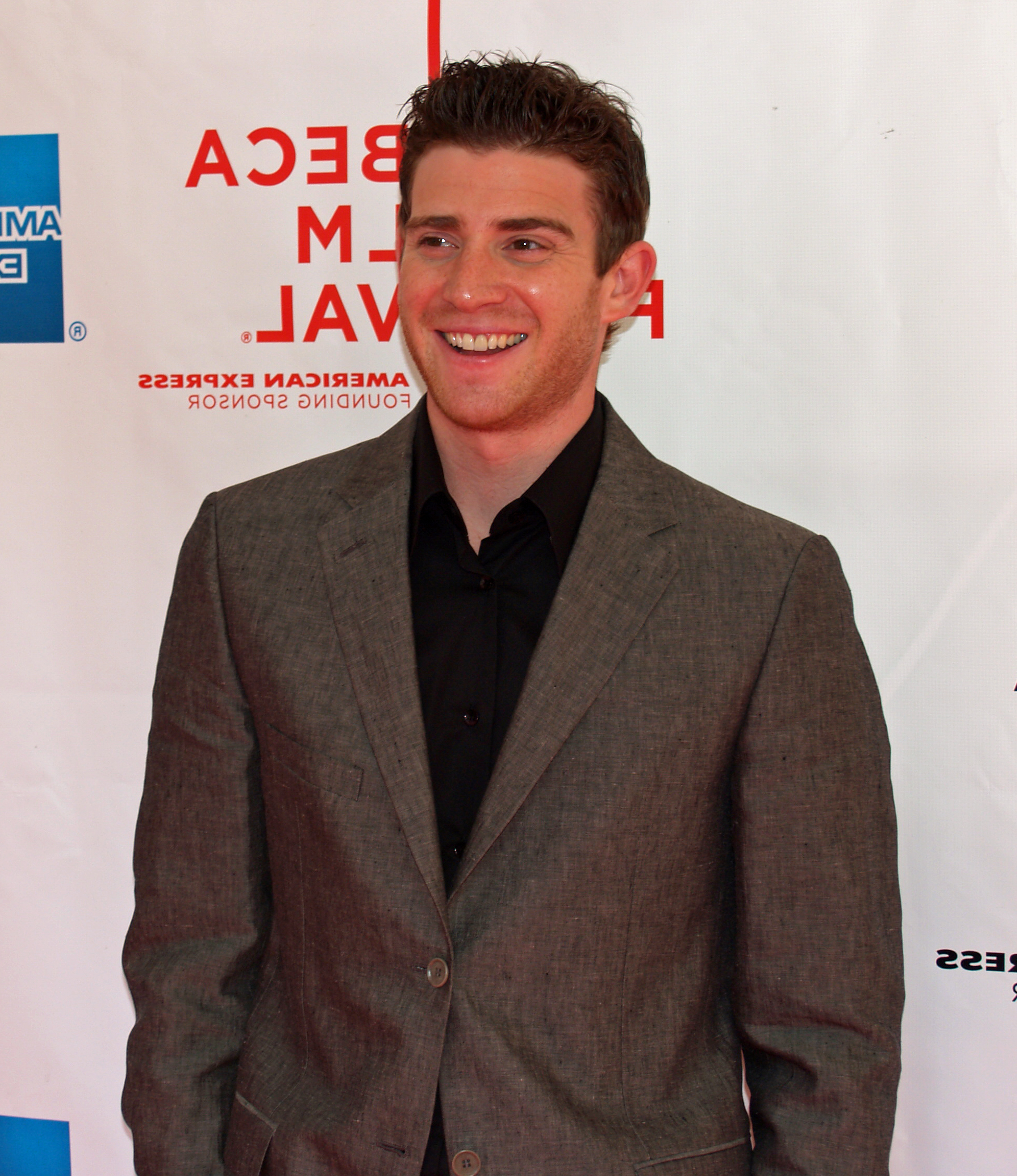
- Greenberg at the 2007 Tribeca Film Festival
- Born: May 24, 1978 (age 48); Omaha, Nebraska, U.S.
- Occupation: Actor
- Years active: 1997–present
- Spouse: Jamie Chung (m. 2015)
- Children: 2
- Website: bryangreenberg.wordpress.com

Bryan Greenberg (born May 24, 1978) is an American actor. He is known for his starring role as Ben Epstein in the HBO original series How to Make It in America as well as a recurring role in The Mindy Project. He also had a recurring role as Jake Jagielski in the WB series One Tree Hill and as Nick Garrett on the ABC drama October Road. His film work includes The Perfect Score, Prime, Bride Wars, and Friends with Benefits. He made his directorial debut with his film Junction.

== Early life ==
Greenberg was born May 24, 1978, in Omaha, Nebraska, U.S. the son of psychologists Denise "Denny" (b.1951) and Carl Greenberg (b.1950). He is Jewish and was raised in Conservative Judaism. Growing up, he attended Beth El Synagogue in Omaha. He had a Bar Mitzvah ceremony, belonged to Jewish youth groups, went to Jewish summer camps where he acted in theater productions, and traveled to Israel.

At seven years old, Greenberg appeared in the lead role in the Omaha Ballet production of The Nutcracker. He toured with the show for two months and later joined a children's theater company in Omaha. At age 12, Greenberg and his family moved to St. Louis, Missouri, where he got his first major role in a nationally-broadcast Cookie Crisp cereal commercial.

He graduated from Parkway Central High School in Chesterfield, Missouri in 1996 and moved to New York City after high school.

== Acting career ==
While at NYU, Greenberg auditioned and worked as a waiter, bartender, caterer and assistant to a mortgage broker. He was cast as Romeo in NYU's performance of Romeo and Juliet and performed with the Experimental Theater Workshop, the Atlantic Theater Company and the Amsterdam Experimental Workshop.

In 1997, he got a small role as murder victim Matthew Wheeler on the television series Law & Order. Soon after this appearance, Greenberg got an agent and one year later made his big screen debut in A Civil Action.

After landing small roles on several TV series (Boston Public, The Sopranos, and Third Watch among others), Greenberg was cast as Matty Matthews, a high school student trying to pass the SAT exam, in the film The Perfect Score. After graduating from NYU, Bryan moved to California. While he was still appearing in One Tree Hill, he began shooting another television show produced by George Clooney for HBO called Unscripted.

Greenberg's first starring role was in the Ben Younger film Prime (2005). He played David Bloomberg, a young artist who falls in love with one of his mother Meryl Streep's therapy patients, played by Uma Thurman. Greenberg then starred in October Road on ABC and appeared with Alan Rickman in the film Nobel Son in 2008. In 2009, Greenberg appeared in the film Bride Wars with Kate Hudson and Anne Hathaway and starred opposite Alexis Bledel and Scott Porter in the indie film The Good Guy, which was released in February 2010.

His series How to Make It in America premiered on HBO on February 14, 2010. The Washington Post called it "The New Yorkiest thing you could find on television, which is saying something," and praised its "portrayal of a dirty, scrappy, multi-ethnic New York culture." The New York Times said the "series has great music (the theme song is Aloe Blacc’s 'I Need a Dollar') and there are some snarky asides about hipster New York." Season 2 premiered on October 2, 2011. On December 20, 2011, HBO announced the cancellation of the show.

In 2012, Greenberg co-starred with Laura Prepon in the independent comedy film The Kitchen. That same year, Greenberg starred in the dark comedy film The Normals, which follows a young man who enters a two-week clinical trial of an anti-psychotic treatment at a drug-testing center in Queens.

In 2013, Greenberg began shooting the untitled Lance Armstrong biopic alongside Ben Foster, who will play Armstrong.

In 2015, Greenberg and his wife Jamie Chung co-starred together in the romantic drama Already Tomorrow in Hong Kong.

In 2024, Greenberg joined the cast of Suits LA opposite Stephen Amell.

== Music ==
In 2007, Greenberg released his debut album, Waiting for Now. He has toured with Gavin DeGraw, Michael Tolcher, Ari Hest, and Graham Colton. At his New York City Show at the High Line Ballroom, Greenberg was joined by How to Make it in America co-star Kid Cudi. Greenberg's songs have been featured in many of his film and television work, including One Tree Hill, October Road, and Nobel Son.

In 2011, Greenberg released his second album, We Don't Have Forever, produced by Thom Monahan (Vetiver, Devendra Banhart, Gary Louris), which included the single "Walk Away". The album also included "You Can Run", a collaboration with How to Make It in America co-star and rapper Kid Cudi. Greenberg said he wrote the record over a period of two years when he was experiencing many changes in his life and decided to title the record We Don't Have Forever to reflect that.

== Personal life ==
In 2012, Greenberg began dating actress Jamie Chung. They became engaged in December 2013 and were married on October 31, 2015, in Santa Barbara, California. Their twin sons were born via surrogacy in October 2021.

In January 2025, Greenberg and Chung's house in Los Angeles was destroyed by a wildfire.

== Filmography ==
=== Film ===
Year	Title	Role	Notes
1998	A Civil Action	Firecracker kid	Uncredited
2004	The Perfect Score	Matty Matthews	
2005	Prime	David Bloomberg	
2006	Escape	Bryan	Short film
2006	Love & Debate	Chris	
2007	Nobel Son	Barkley Michaelson	
2009	Bride Wars	Nathan "Nate" Lerner	
2009	The Good Guy	Daniel Seaver	
2011	Friends with Benefits	Parker	
2012	The Kitchen	Paul	
2012	The Normals	Billy Schine	
2014	A Short History of Decay	Nathan Fisher	
2015	Vice	Evan	
2015	A Year and Change	Owen	
2015	Already Tomorrow in Hong Kong	Josh	
2015	The Program	Floyd's buddy	Uncredited
2016	Flock of Dudes	Barrett	
2017	Random Tropical Paradise	Harry Fluder	
2018	Fourplay	Tom	
2022	The Mental State	Dylan Cady	
2023	You People	Issac	
2024	Junction	Michael	Also writer and director

=== Television ===
Year	Title	Role	Notes
1997	Law & Order	Matt Wheeler	Episode: "Thrill"
2000	The Sopranos	Peter McClure	Episode: "Guy Walks into a Psychiatrist's Office..."
2000	Third Watch	Francis DeSilva	Episode: "Journey to the Himalayas"
2000, 2003	Boston Public	Mr. Freeman	2 episodes
2001	Three Sisters	Roy	Episode: "A Date with Destiny"
2002	Strong Medicine	Kent	Episode: "Rape Kit"
2002	The Chronicle	Damon Furberg	Episode: "The Stepford Cheerleaders"
2002	Providence	Neal	Episode: "Great Expectations"
2003–2006	One Tree Hill	Jake Jagielski	26 episodes
2004	Life with Bonnie	Timmy	Episode: "Nip, Tuck and Role"
2005–2006	Unscripted	Himself	Main role; 10 episodes
2007–2008	October Road	Nicholson "Nick" Garrett	Main role; 19 episodes
2010–2011	How to Make It in America	Ben Epstein	Main cast; 16 episodes
2013	The Arrangement	Billy Whitley	Television film
2015	Bessie	John Hammond	Television film
2016–2017	The Mindy Project	Ben	13 episodes
2017–2018	The Tick	Derek	4 episodes
2018	Sideswiped	Ryan	Episode: "The Ex"
2019	God Friended Me	Teddy Preston	Episode: "The Lady"
2019	Same Time, Next Christmas	Gregg Harris	Television film
2023	Round and Round	Zach	Television film
2024	The Vince Staples Show	Officer	Episode: "Pink House"
2024	The Emperor of Ocean Park	Howard Denton	
2025	Suits LA	Rick Dodsen	Main role
2025	Emily in Paris	Jake Campbell	Episode: "The One Where Emily Goes to the Embassy"

== Discography ==
=== Albums ===
- Waiting for Now (2007)
- We Don't Have Forever (2011)
- Everything Changes (2015)
- The 36 Hour - EP (2019)

== Other activities ==
- In 2008, Greenberg appeared in will.i.am's song "Yes We Can."
- In 2010, Greenberg made a public service announcement about the Gulf Oil Spill for Natural Resources Defense Council calling for Clean Energy Legislation. It was released July 20, 2010.
