= The Good Guy (film) =

- Theatrical release poster
- Directed by: Julio DePietro
- Written by: Julio DePietro
- Produced by: Linda Moran; Rene Bastian; Julio DePietro
- Starring: Alexis Bledel; Scott Porter; Bryan Greenberg; Andrew McCarthy; Aaron Yoo
- Edited by: Ray Hubley
- Music by: Kurt Oldman and Tomandandy
- Production company: Belladonna Productions Movie Studio
- Distributed by: Roadside Attractions
- Release dates: April 26, 2009 (Tribeca); February 18, 2010
- Running time: 91 minutes
- Country: United States
- Language: English
- Budget: $10 million
- Box office: $106,460

The Good Guy is a 2009 American romantic comedy film directed by Julio DePietro starring Alexis Bledel, Scott Porter, and Bryan Greenberg. The story is a loose adaptation of Ford Madox Ford's 1915 novel The Good Soldier, which is referenced several times in the film's plot.

== Plot ==
The film explores the complexity of modern relationships set against the backdrop of Wall Street's high stakes environment. Beth, played by Alexis Bledel, is a young Manhattanite and urban conservationist looking for a fulfilling life, including a good job, good friends, and importantly, a good guy to share her life with. She falls for Tommy Fielding, portrayed by Scott Porter, a charismatic and successful investment broker who seems to have everything going for him. Tommy is charming, clever, and very good at his job, impressing his ruthless boss, Cash.

The plot thickens when Tommy decides to mentor Daniel, played by Bryan Greenberg, a former avionics engineer and computer geek, who is new to the cutthroat world of finance. Tommy takes Daniel under his wing, teaching him the ways of high finance and how to navigate social situations, including how to charm women. Daniel, who is somewhat naive and nervous, begins to adapt to this new lifestyle, transforming under Tommy's guidance. However, complications arise when Daniel meets Beth, not knowing she's Tommy's girlfriend. As Daniel becomes more integrated into Tommy's life, he inadvertently becomes part of Beth's social circle, joining her women's book club, which leads to romantic tension and shifts in their relationships.

As the story unfolds, Beth's relationship with Tommy is put to the test with the introduction of Daniel, who brings a different, more sensitive perspective to the table. The film plays with the idea of perception and reality, drawing parallels to Ford Madox Ford's novel "The Good Soldier," which is referenced in the movie. Tommy's character is revealed to be less than the "good guy" he initially appears, engaging in behaviors that challenge Beth's trust and affection. Meanwhile, Daniel's genuine nature and developing bond with Beth create a love triangle that questions the authenticity of relationships in a world driven by ambition and superficiality. The narrative explores themes of honesty, integrity, and the search for true connection amidst the chaos of city life and corporate culture.

== Cast ==
- Alexis Bledel as Beth Vest
- Scott Porter as Tommy Fielding
- Bryan Greenberg as Daniel Seaver
- Anna Chlumsky as Lisa
- Andrew McCarthy as Cash
- Aaron Yoo as Steve-O
- Andrew Stewart-Jones as Shakespeare
- Denise Vasi as Suki
- Jessalyn Wanlim as Jordan
- Eric Thal as Stephens
- Kate Nauta as Cynthia
- Colin Egglesfield as Baker
- Adam LeFevre as Billy
- Jackie Stewart as Sofia
- Monica Steuer as Florist
- Darrin Baker as Bobby
- Adrian Martinez as Larry

== Soundtracks ==
- The Helio Sequence - Lately
- Let's Go Sailing - Sideways
- Sam Champion - Like a Secret
- White Denim - Let's Talk About It
- Born Ruffians - I Need a Life
- Atmosphere - Party Over Here
- Wang Chung - Everybody Have Fun Tonight
- The Helio Sequence - Don't Look Away
- The Cliks - Oh Yeah
- Ra Ra Riot - Can You Tell
- Plushgun - Just Impolite
- Mancino - Lavender Lake
- Copperpot - The Art of Rap
- Sam Champion - Be Mine Everyone
- Rachel Platten - Seven Weeks
- Stars - Your Ex-Lover Is Dead
- Say Hi - Hallie and Henry

== Reception ==
On Rotten Tomatoes the film has an approval rating of 33% based on reviews from 24 critics. The website's critics consensus, "The Good Guy has an attractive cast, but they aren't done any favors by the film's cardboard characters and cliched plot." On Metacritic the film has a score of 47% based on reviews from 13 critics, indicating "mixed or average reviews".

Roger Ebert of the Chicago Sun-Times gave it 3 out of 4 and wrote: "It has smart characters, and is wise about the ones who try to tame their intelligence by acting out."

Andrew Barker of Variety wrote, that "Lacking much of a satirical bite, the pic's quasi-celebration of crude laddishness becomes oppressive."
