= Why Him? =

- Theatrical release poster
- Directed by: John Hamburg
- Screenplay by: John Hamburg; Ian Helfer
- Story by: Jonah Hill; John Hamburg; Ian Helfer
- Produced by: Shawn Levy; Dan Levine; Ben Stiller; Jonah Hill
- Starring: James Franco; Bryan Cranston; Megan Mullally; Zoey Deutch; Cedric the Entertainer; Griffin Gluck; Keegan-Michael Key
- Cinematography: Kris Kachikis
- Edited by: William Kerr; Dean Zimmerman
- Music by: Theodore Shapiro
- Production companies: Red Hour Productions; 21 Laps Entertainment; 75 Year Plan Productions
- Distributed by: 20th Century Fox
- Release dates: December 17, 2016 (Los Angeles); December 23, 2016 (United States)
- Running time: 111 minutes
- Country: United States
- Language: English
- Budget: $38–52 million
- Box office: $118.1 million

Why Him? is a 2016 American romantic comedy film directed by John Hamburg, written by Hamburg and Ian Helfer based on a story by Jonah Hill, produced by Hill, Shawn Levy, and Ben Stiller, and stars James Franco and Bryan Cranston with Zoey Deutch, Megan Mullally, Cedric the Entertainer, Griffin Gluck and Keegan-Michael Key in supporting roles. The film follows a father who tries to stop his daughter's immature tech-millionaire boyfriend from asking her to marry him.

The film premiered in Los Angeles on December 17, 2016, was released by 20th Century Fox in the United States on December 23, 2016. It received generally negative reviews from critics, but was a financial success, grossing $118.1 million worldwide on a $52 million budget.

== Plot ==
Stanford student Stephanie Fleming invites her partner Laird Mayhew over to "Netflix and chill". Meanwhile, back home in Grand Rapids, Stephanie's dad Ned is celebrating his 55th birthday with friends and family at an Applebee's. During a slideshow presentation in his honor, Stephanie drops in via webcam to congratulate him, when suddenly Laird walks in on her and flashes the camera.

After picking them up at the airport, Stephanie drives her family – parents Ned and Barb and younger brother Scotty – to Laird's Silicon Valley villa to meet him. She explains to Ned that Laird is the CEO of a video game company, which has made him extremely wealthy. Laird gives the family a tour of his house, complete with curse words and inappropriate comments about Barb. He then reveals a large tattoo of the Flemings' Christmas card on his back, complete with "Happy Holidays" written underneath. In the living room is a tank with a moose filled completely with its urine. The basement has a bowling alley that Laird built with a mural of Ned, posed in a "crotch-chop" position.

Ned talks to Stephanie about Laird's behavior and she asks him to give him a chance. Later, as Laird goes with Ned for a walk in the woods outside his house, he asks Ned for his blessing to propose to Stephanie. Ned is quick to say no, which completely blindsides Laird, who had been confident that Ned would say yes. Laird promises to win him over.

As the family gathers in Laird's living room for Christmas Eve, Laird reveals that he bought Ned's struggling printing company as a gift to remove all his debts. Instead of expressing gratitude, Ned punches Laird in the face and they begin to fight, which culminates in Laird falling into the moose tank, which subsequently breaks and leaves Scotty briefly trapped under the moose. Stephanie and Barb are both angry at their partner's behaviors, and the Flemings leave Laird's home.

On Christmas Day, the Flemings are celebrating without Stephanie. They are surprised when Laird's helicopter arrives with Stephanie. She is still mad at both Ned and Laird for their behavior and refuses to talk to either of them. Ned and Laird talk and Laird gets Ned's blessing to propose to Stephanie. However, she declines the proposal saying she is not ready to get married, but she wants them to continue dating.

Later during the party, Ned and Scotty approach Laird with a new business idea, since they are all part of the same company now. Scotty suggests they sell the same toilets Laird has in his home since they would be very profitable. Laird likes the idea and agrees. The couples then dance together as music plays, with Ned referring to Laird as "son".

Scotty, Ned, and Laird eventually turn the printing company into a toilet factory and become profitable. Stephanie uses the Fleming-Mayhew conglomerate to help underdeveloped countries with their sewage projects. Finally, Laird has what he always wanted, to be part of a family.

== Cast ==
- James Franco as Laird Mayhew, the eccentric, foul-mouthed, but well-meaning CEO of a video game company and Stephanie's boyfriend
- Bryan Cranston as Ned Fleming, Stephanie's conservative father and Barb's husband
- Zoey Deutch as Stephanie Fleming, Laird's girlfriend, Ned and Barb's daughter, and Scotty's older sister
- Megan Mullally as Barb Fleming, Ned's wife and Stephanie's mother
- Cedric the Entertainer as Lou Dunne, Ned's best friend and business partner
- Griffin Gluck as Scotty Fleming, Stephanie's 15-year-old younger brother and Ned and Barb's son
- Keegan-Michael Key as Gustav, Laird's best friend, butler, assistant and trainer, who also manages his estate
- Tangie Ambrose as Patty Dunne, Lou's wife
- Zack Pearlman as Kevin Dingle, Ned's I.T. guy
- Kaley Cuoco as the voice of Justine, Laird's in-home artificial intelligence
- Casey Wilson as Missy Pederman, Blaine's sister and the owner of an online invitation company called StampFree Invites
- Andrew Rannells as Blaine Pederman, Missy's brother and business partner
- Adam DeVine as Tyson Modell, the creator of the wildly popular Ghostchat app
- Steve Bannos as Tree Lot Owner Burt
- Mary Pat Gleason as Joyce
- Bob Stephenson as Jerry in Graphics

There are cameos by technology, gaming, and entertainment figures, including Burnie Burns, Steve Aoki, Richard Blais, Elon Musk, Toby Turner, and Gene Simmons and Paul Stanley of KISS.

== Production ==
On November 18, 2014, it was announced that John Hamburg and Ian Helfer were co-writing a comedy film, Why Him?, for 20th Century Fox. On February 27, 2015, James Franco was in talks to star in the film, playing a young billionaire. Shawn Levy's 21 Laps Entertainment and Ben Stiller's Red Hour Productions were set to produce the film, about a Midwestern father who travels with his family to visit his daughter at college, and finds himself disliking her new billionaire boyfriend. On August 25, 2015, Bryan Cranston was set to star in the film, playing the father. In August 2015, the film was selected by the California Film Commission to receive $5.4 million in tax credits.

On December 8, 2015, Zoey Deutch was cast in the film's female lead role, as Cranston's character's daughter and the billionaire's girlfriend. Bryce Dallas Howard, Jordana Brewster and Mélanie Laurent were also considered. On January 12, 2016, Griffin Gluck was added to the cast of the film to play Scotty Fleming, the son of Cranston's character. On January 13, 2016, Megan Mullally joined the film to play Barb Fleming, the wife of Ned (Cranston). On January 19, 2016, Keegan-Michael Key was cast as the billionaire's European-hailing estate manager, and following him, Zack Pearlman also signed on for a role in the film. Musician Steve Aoki also appeared in the film.

Principal photography on the film began in mid-February 2016 in Los Angeles.

== Release ==
Why Him? was released in the United States on December 23, 2016, by 20th Century Fox. It was originally planned for a November 11, 2016 release date.

=== Home media ===
Why Him? was released on DVD and Blu-ray on March 28, 2017.

=== Box office ===
Why Him? grossed $60.3 million in the United States and Canada and $57.8 million in other territories for a worldwide total of $118.1 million, against a production budget of $52 million.

Why Him? was expected to gross $10–14 million from 2,917 theaters over its first four days of release. It grossed $3.9 million on its first day and $11 million during its opening weekend (a four-day total of $15.5 million), finishing 4th at the box office.

=== Critical response ===
On Rotten Tomatoes, Why Him? has an approval rating of 40% based on 154 reviews, with an average rating of 5/10. The website's critical consensus reads: "Solidly cast but overall misconceived, Why Him? offers the odd chuckle, but ultimately adds disappointingly little to its tired father-vs.-fiancé formula." On Metacritic, the film has a weighted average score of 39 out of 100, based on 30 critics, indicating "generally unfavorable reviews". Audiences polled by CinemaScore gave the film an average grade of "B+" on an A+ to F scale.

=== Commentary ===
French political scientist Thibault Muzergues remarks in his book The Great Class Shift that the film captures the tension created by the contrast in values between the Protestant work ethic of the suburban middle class, as represented by Ned, and the looser approach of Laird and other members of the creative class, a real sociopolitical phenomenon.

== See also ==
- List of Christmas films
