= Go Back to China =

2019 drama film

- Film poster
- Directed by: Emily Ting
- Written by: Emily Ting
- Produced by: Emily Ting; Sophia Shek; Frederick Thornton
- Starring: Anna Akana; Richard Ng; Lynn Chen; Kelly Hu
- Cinematography: Josh Silfen
- Edited by: Anthony Rosc
- Music by: Timo Chen
- Production companies: Unbound Feet Productions; IXII Productions
- Distributed by: Gravitas Ventures
- Release dates: March 2019 (SXSW); March 6, 2020 (United States)
- Countries: China; United States
- Languages: English; Cantonese

Go Back to China is a 2019 drama film written and directed by Emily Ting. It stars Anna Akana as Sasha Li, a trust fund wannabe designer whose father pressures her to go to Shenzhen to learn the family business. The film is semi-autobiographical and is based on Ting's life and relationship with her father.

== Plot ==
Sasha Li is a recent fashion grad living in L.A. who is unable to find work and lives off of a lucrative one million dollar trust fund given to her by her estranged father, a Chinese manufacturer who mass-produces plushies.

On her birthday Sasha learns that her father has cut off access to her trust fund so that she will come work for the family business in China. When that doesn't work, her father cuts off alimony payments to her mother, forcing Sasha to capitulate.

In Shenzhen, Sasha reunites with her older half-sister Carol and her younger siblings born from her father's affair with one of his workers. To her disgust, she also learns that his latest girlfriend, Lulu, is near her age.

Sasha joins Carol in working for her father at his toy factory. After attending a sales pitch where buyers tell her father his products are dated, Sasha takes her father's designers to Hong Kong to look at products and get new ideas.

Sasha gets her father's approval to design a unique looking toy collection for Christmas which ends up selling well. When Carol and Sasha go out to celebrate, Carol reveals that their father was still married to her mother when Sasha's mother began an affair with him, and over the years, he had many affairs and pressured many of his girlfriends to have abortions.

The Christmas toy collection moves forward under Sasha's guidance. She makes a modification to one of the items on the toy, exchanging a plain fabric scarf for a sequinned one, only to learn that the sequins represent a choking hazard, and she has already ordered the scarf fabric in extensive quantities. Sasha's father and Carol decide to go forward with production anyway only to have the product recalled after a child does choke on it. After her father screams at her, Sasha abruptly quits. Carol begs her to stay as she planned to finally leave their domineering father and leave Sasha as her substitute. Sasha refuses and urges Carol to stop seeking their father's approval and become independent.

Sasha returns to L.A., despondent over the recalled toys. Her friends suggest that she give one of the recalled toys to a child social influencer to review and the ensuing popularity causes her father's distributor to withdraw their recall and re-issue the toy without the scarves. Impressed with Sasha's design and marketing skills they also hire her to work for them.

Sasha receives a visit from Carol and learns she has finally quit the company and decided to live life on her own terms. Returning to China on a business trip Sasha visits her father and suggests he use what's left of her trust fund to provide child care for his factory workers to boost morale. She also offers to continue designing toys for him freelance, which he accepts.

== Cast ==
- Anna Akana as Sasha Li
- Richard Ng as Teddy Li
- Lynn Chen as Carol Li
- Kelly Hu as May Li
- Aviva Wang as Dior Li
- Tiger Ting as Christian Li
- Kendy Cheung as Lulu
- Taryn Look as Tracy
- Brittany Renee Finamore as Jessica
- Christina Thomas as Renee

== Release ==
Go Back to China premiered at the 2019 SXSW Film Festival. The film had a limited release in the United States on March 6, 2020.

=== Critical reception ===
On the review aggregator website Rotten Tomatoes, 83% of 29 critics' reviews are positive. The website's consensus reads: "Uneven but entertaining, Go Back to China puts a refreshing cross-cultural spin on the traditional coming-of-age story arc." On Metacritic, the film has a weighted average score of 51 out of 100 based on 8 critics, which the site labels as "mixed or average" reviews.
