= Ava Michelle =

American actress (born 2002)

- Born: Ava Michelle Cota; April 10, 2002 (age 24); Linden, Michigan, U.S.
- Occupations: Actress, dancer, model
- Years active: 2014–present

Ava Michelle Cota (born April 10, 2002) is an American actress, dancer and model. She is known for her role as the character Jodi Kreyman in the Netflix comedies Tall Girl and Tall Girl 2. She made regular appearances in the third to seventh seasons of Dance Moms, as well as being a member of the Select Ensemble team in season four for a short time.

== Early life ==
Cota was born on April 10, 2002, the daughter of Rick and Jeanette Cota, and was raised in Linden, Michigan. She attended JC's Broadway Dance Academy, which was owned and operated by her mother Jeanette but closed permanently in 2022. Ava was a guest dancer of the ALDC "Select Team" in season 4 of Dance Moms.

Ava has been trained in contemporary, ballet, pointe, jazz, and tap dance. She is also a model and made her debut on the runway for New York Fashion Week in 2017. In 2018, she launched a social media campaign, #13Reasons4Me, that encourages people to list 13 things they love about themselves or in their lives.

== Career ==
Cota appeared in 2013 on the television series Dance Moms and was a regular on the show for another 4 years. She later toured the United States with other stars from Dance Moms in 2018. In 2016, she was in the first episode of So You Think You Can Dance: The Next Generation.

She appeared in several short movies in 2018 and made appearances in two episodes of The Bold and the Beautiful. Her first major role in acting came as playing the lead character in the Netflix film Tall Girl, which was released on September 13, 2019. Michelle began filming the Tall Girl sequel, Tall Girl 2, in April 2021.

== Filmography ==
=== Film ===
Year	Title	Role	Notes
2018	This Is Me	Olivia Newton-John	Short film
2018	Mamma Mia!	Anna	Short film
2018	A Christmas Dinner	Sophia Bailey	
2019	Tall Girl	Jodi Kreyman	
2022	Tall Girl 2	Jodi Kreyman	

=== Television ===
Year	Title	Role	Notes
2014–2017	Dance Moms	Herself	18 episodes
2016	So You Think You Can Dance: The Next Generation	Herself	1 episode
2018	The Bold and the Beautiful	Forrester model	2 episodes
2020	Zombies 2: The Collab	Zombie	Television film
