= Griffin Gluck =

American actor (born 2000)

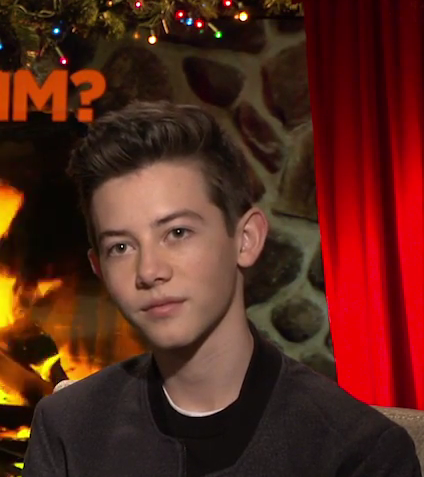
- Gluck in 2016
- Born: Griffin Alexander Gluck; August 24, 2000 (age 26); Los Angeles, California, U.S.
- Education: Bard College
- Occupation: Actor
- Years active: 2009–present
- Known for: Why Him?; Middle School: The Worst Years of My Life; Big Time Adolescence; Locke & Key
- Relatives: Jay Gluck (paternal grandfather)

Griffin Alexander Gluck (born August 24, 2000) is an American actor. Gluck began his career as a child actor in comedy films such as Just Go with It (2011) and Why Him? (2016). He had his first leading role as a comatose teenager in the drama series Red Band Society (2014–2015) and gained acclaim for playing a young film prodigy in the Netflix mockumentary series American Vandal (2017–2018) and as Gabe/Dodge in the Netflix horror series Locke & Key (2020–2022). He also had further leading roles in comedy films Middle School: The Worst Years of My Life (2016); Big Time Adolescence (2019); Tall Girl (2019) and its 2022 sequel; and North Hollywood (2021). He appeared in the second season of the Freeform thriller anthology Cruel Summer (2023).

== Early life ==
Gluck was born in Los Angeles. His father, Cellin Gluck, is a film director and producer, and his mother, Karin Beck, was a production assistant and line producer. Griffin's father was born in Wakayama Prefecture, Japan, to American parents, and was raised partly in Kobe, Japan. Griffin's paternal grandparents were Sumi (Hiramoto), a Japanese American, and Jay Gluck, a Jewish American archaeologist, historian, and Japanophile. Gluck attended Bard College in New York state for one semester before dropping out, where he studied creative writing.

== Career ==
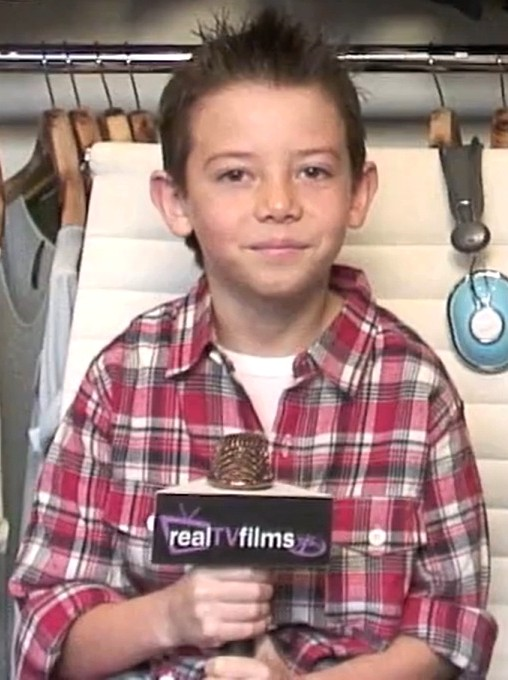
Gluck in 2011

Gluck started acting when he went with his older sister, Caroline, to a summer children's showcase of Guys and Dolls at the Palisades Playhouse. His first major role was as a three-year-old in a short film, Time Out, co-produced by his father and directed by Robbie Chafitz.

His big break came in 2011, when he played Michael in the film Just Go with It, for which he received a Young Artist Award nomination. He was later cast as Mason Warner on Private Practice, and was then upped to series regular on the show. After the series was cancelled, he joined a TV pilot called Back in the Game from 20th Century Fox TV. It was picked to series. The show was canceled in November 2013

In 2014, Gluck co-starred as Charlie on the Fox series Red Band Society, in which his character, who is in a coma, is the narrator of the show. In March 2015, he was cast in an NBC pilot, Cuckoo, which was not picked for series.

Gluck had his first film lead role playing Rafe Khatchadorian in the 2016 movie Middle School: The Worst Years of My Life, based on the hit novel by James Patterson.

In 2019, Gluck joined Netflix fantasy horror series Locke & Key as a series regular and remained on the show for three seasons.

== Filmography ==
=== Film ===
Year	Title	Role	Notes
2009	Sideways	Pharmacy boy	
2011	Just Go with It	Michael Murphy / Bart Maccabee	
2013	Trust Me	Phillip	
2014	Just Before I Go	Randy Morgan	
2015	Batman vs. Robin	Young Bruce Wayne	Voice role
2015	Larry Gaye: Renegade Male Flight Attendant	Donnie	
2015	All Hallows' Eve 2	Max	Segment: "A Boy's Life"
2016	Middle School: The Worst Years of My Life	Rafe Khatchadorian	
2016	Why Him?	Scotty Fleming	
2018	The Boxcar Children: Surprise Island	Henry	Voice role
2019	Big Time Adolescence	Monroe "Mo" Harris	
2019	Tall Girl	Jack Dunkleman	
2020	Dinner in America	Kevin	
2021	North Hollywood	Drew	
2022	Tall Girl 2	Jack Dunkleman	
2024	The Real Bros of Simi Valley: High School Reunion	Aaron	
2024	Time Cut	Quinn	
2026	Seekers of Infinite Love †		Post-production

=== Television ===
Year	Title	Role	Notes
2010	The Office	Robert Lipton's son	Episode: "WUPHF.com"
2011	United States of Tara	Monty	3 episodes
2011–2013	Private Practice	Mason Warner	Main role (seasons 5–6)
2013–2014	Back in the Game	Danny Gannon	Main role
2014	Silicon Valley	Adderall boy	Episode: "Third Party Insourcing"
2014–2015	Red Band Society	Charlie	Main role
2015	About a Boy	Clay	3 episodes
2015	Cuckoo	Dylan	Television pilot
2015	Life in Pieces	Aiden	Episode: "Godparent Turkey Corn Farts"
2016	Impastor	Austin	2 episodes
2017	The Mick	Dylan	2 episodes
2017	Man with a Plan	Tyler	Episode: "Into the Weeds"
2017–2018	American Vandal	Sam Ecklund	Main role
2020–2022	Locke & Key	Gabe	Main role (seasons 1–2); guest (season 3)
2020	Love Life	Young Luke Ducharme	Episode: "Luke Ducharme"
2020	The Real Bros of Simi Valley	Aaron	Recurring role
2023	Cruel Summer	Luke Chambers	Main role (season 2)

== Awards and nominations ==
Gluck was nominated in the "Best Performance in a Feature Film – Supporting Young Actor" category for his work in Just Go with It at the 33rd Young Artist Awards.
