= Tall Girl 2 =

2022 American film by Emily Ting

- Promotional release poster
- Directed by: Emily Ting
- Written by: Sam Wolfson
- Based on: Characters by Sam Wolfson
- Produced by: McG; Mary Viola; Corey Marsh
- Starring: Ava Michelle; Griffin Gluck; Sabrina Carpenter; Anjelika Washington; Luke Eisner; Clara Wilsey; Rico Paris; Jan Luis Castellanos; Angela Kinsey; Steve Zahn
- Cinematography: Shane Hurlbut
- Edited by: Melissa Kent
- Music by: Mateo Messina
- Production company: Wonderland Sound and Vision
- Distributed by: Netflix
- Release date: February 11, 2022
- Running time: 97 minutes
- Country: United States
- Language: English
- Budget: $24.4 million

Tall Girl 2 is a 2022 American teen romantic comedy film directed by Emily Ting and written by Sam Wolfson. The film stars Ava Michelle, Sabrina Carpenter, Luke Eisner, Griffin Gluck, and Steve Zahn. It is the sequel to the 2019 film Tall Girl.

The film was released on February 11, 2022, and received mixed reviews. Some deemed it a slight improvement over its predecessor.

== Plot ==
Jodi's newfound fame and ambition to get a part in the spring musical prove to be huge roadblocks in her otherwise smooth relationship with Dunkleman. She finds herself fighting her fears and dealing with anxiety attacks. After landing the lead part of Kim in Bye Bye Birdie, Jodi is bewildered, her insecurities calling to her through a voice inside her head. Tommy is cast as the lead opposite Jodi in the production.

Meanwhile, others struggle with their own insecurities. Harper, Jodi's sister, is attempting to prove that she is capable of more than just competing in beauty pageants. Fareeda wishes for her parents to support her dream of becoming a fashion designer. Dunkleman's relationship with Jodi faces questions, and her bully Kimmy, who she beat for the lead role, is now determined to ensure Jodi flames out.

Kimmy wants to enlist Schnipper in her plots, but he refuses due to his crush on Jodi as a result of the kiss they shared. Kimmy finds out that she doesn't have to do much to upset Jodi, so her first week of rehearsals doesn't go as planned, despite Tommy's assurances.

The strain eventually takes its toll on Jodi's relationship with Dunkleman: after he promises her she can skip their anniversary dinner to rehearse, he still becomes upset when she actually does. They part soon after, and Jodi becomes close to Tommy, with whom she shares a kiss one night.

Jodi starts to reconcile with Dunkleman, but when she admits that she kissed someone else, he reacts angrily, and they officially break up. He makes a contract with Stig's sister Stella, who is going through her own break-up, and swears to never see her again.

Jodi participates in the pre-show “burning ceremony”, which is meant to purge the cast of any negativity before their performance. She intends to set fire to the shoes Dunkleman gave her in the first film, but she changes her mind halfway through. Kimmy is the one who saves them from the fire, which marks the beginning of her bully's redemption.

Despite Tommy's interest in her, Jodi admits that she is still not over Dunkleman, and they agree to merely be friends. Jodi gives Fareeda her blessing to date Stig at the pre-opening night celebration, and Dunkleman appears to give Jodi a pep talk. Stella also gives him a long-overdue scolding for his reaction to Jodi's kiss with Tommy.

Despite her parents’ guidance on how to deal with nerves, Jodi is still having trouble with her inner voice on the opening night of the show. Kimmy completes her redemption by declining Jodi's offer to take her place on stage, instead telling Jodi that she will stay in the wings and give her cues if she forgets anything.

Opening night is a success, and after the show, Jodi finally silences her inner critic by reminding herself that she is good enough. When Dunkleman arrives, he discloses that he had been photographing in the lighting booth all night. He confesses his love for Jodi, which she reciprocates, they reconcile and kiss.

== Cast ==
- Ava Michelle as Jodi Kreyman
- Sabrina Carpenter as Harper Kreyman
- Griffin Gluck as Jack Dunkleman
- Luke Eisner as Stig Mohlin
- Anjelika Washington as Fareeda Marks
- Rico Paris as Schnipper
- Johanna Liauw as Stella Mohlin
- Clara Wilsey as Kimmy Stitcher
- Steve Zahn as Richie Kreyman
- Angela Kinsey as Helaine Kreyman
- Jan Luis Castellanos as Tommy Torres
- Chris Wylde as Corey Dunkleman
- Rachael Thompson as Ms. Lee
- Odessa Feaster as Fareeda's mom
- Doug Spearman as Fareeda's dad

== Production ==
On December 1, 2020, Netflix asked Sam Wolfson to write a Tall Girl sequel, with Ava Michelle set to return as Jodi. Principal photography began on April 12, 2021, and concluded on May 21, 2021, in New Orleans, Louisiana.

== Release ==
The film was released on February 11, 2022.

== Reception ==
On review aggregator Rotten Tomatoes, the film has an approval rating of 71% based on 7 reviews, with an average rating of 5.0/10. Metacritic, which uses a weighted average, assigned the film a score of 35 out of 100, based on 4 critics, indicating "generally unfavorable" reviews.
