= Magical Girl Friendship Squad: Origins =

American animated television series

- Genre: Animated comedy Magical girl
- Created by: Kelsey Stephanides
- Written by: Diana McCorry
- Directed by: Krystal "K" Downs
- Starring: Anna Akana; Brianna Baker; Anika Noni Rose; Estelle; Daisy Hobbs
- Composer: Noah Pardo (Note: It calls him a sound designer, but this is close enough)
- Country of origin: United States
- Original language: English
- No. of seasons: 1
- No. of episodes: 6

Production
- Executive producers: James Belfer; Adam Belfer; Daniel Shepard; Kelsey Stephanides
- Producer: Diana McCorry
- Animator: Krystal "K" Downs
- Editor: Ben Bishop
- Running time: 4-5 minutes
- Production company: Cartuna

Original release
- Network: Syfy
- Release: February 23 – March 1, 2020

Related
- Magical Girl Friendship Squad

Magical Girl Friendship Squad: Origins is an American adult animated sitcom on Syfy's late-night programming block, TZGZ, created by Kelsey Stephanides and starring Anna Akana, Brianna Baker, Anika Noni Rose, and Estelle. It follows two directionless young women who must figure out how to save the Universe. It is the pilot series of Magical Girl Friendship Squad, which began airing on TZGZ on September 26, 2020, with six 15-minute episodes in its first season.

== Plot ==
The series is a female-driven comedy about Alex (Baker) and Daisy (Akana), two women in their 20s, who are given the duty of saving the universe, as soon as they get their lives together and pay their rent.

== Characters ==
=== Main ===
- Alex (voiced by Brianna "Bedes" Baker) is a friend of Daisy. She uses her birth control as her object of power. She has a strained relationship with her sister (who is a yoga teacher in Minneapolis).
- Daisy (voiced by Anna Akana) is a friend of Alex. She is also a stoner and antihero. She uses her Tom Selleck bong as her object of power. She sleeps with a woman during the second episode of the show.
- Nut (voiced by Anika Noni Rose) is a red panda who gives Daisy and Alex the ability to transform into magical girls, allowing them to work together to save the universe.

=== Recurring ===
- Corporate executive (voiced by Daisy Hobbs)

=== Guests ===
- Verus (voiced by Estelle)

== Episodes ==
No.	Title	Directed by	Written by	Original release date
1	"Origin Story"	Unknown	Diana McCorry	February 23, 2020
A magical red panda approaches Daisy and Alex, asking their help to save the universe.
2	"Superparty"	Unknown	Unknown	March 1, 2020
Alex and Daisy begin using their powers to benefit themselves, but later get very drunk with those powers, leading to unforeseen consequences.
3	"Parent Crap"	Unknown	Unknown	March 1, 2020
Daisy and Alex prepare themselves for their parents, who are visiting them both.
4	"HeroCon"	Unknown	Unknown	March 1, 2020
Daisy and Alex get an invitation to a convention of superheroes from an anonymous source.
5	"Transit of Verus"	Unknown	Unknown	March 1, 2020
Verus visits Alex and Daisy, letting them know about a secret.
6	"The Emptier Will See You Now"	Unknown	Unknown	March 1, 2020
Daisy and Alex wake up and find themselves in the waiting room of the worst, and most sinister, villain in the entire universe.

== Production ==
=== Development ===
Magical Girl Friendship Squad: Origins is an anime-inspired animation created by Kelsey Stephanides. It was said to be inspired by Sailor Moon and other magical girl anime, began airing on Syfy, The series began airing on Syfy's then-new adult animation block, TZGZ, in January 2020. This pilot series was written by Diana McCorry, who created Human Kind Of. Stephanides stated that this series was a parody of the magical girl subgenre and set up the characters, which later were expanded upon in the main show.

In 2015, while in school at New York University, studying media, culture and communications, Stephanides, an avid fan of the magical girl genre, came up with the idea for the show. After talking to her professor, James Belfer of Cartuna, he told her to pitch it to Cartuna, which loved the show. As a result, the production on the series began, meant to be a "short-form pitch to networks," and it was pitched around for years until 2019, when SYFY picked it up, wanting to reboot it, polish it more, and have longer episodes. That led to the creation of the main show, Magical Girl Friendship Squad. Stephanides also noted how this pilot show affected the main show, like the idea of Nut, an animal companion and partner which helps the protagonists, and is somehow the creator of the universe, saying it is "hilarious and adorable."

=== Release ===
After its release in January 2020, it continued to air on SYFY's programming block through the year.

=== Crew ===
The show is produced by Cartuna, a New York animation studio. Krystal "K" Downs is the animation director, Kelsey Stephanides is the showrunner, and Diana McCorry is development producer (and writer) of the show. Like with the main show, Adam Belfer and James Belfer were executive producers, although for this pilot show, Daniel Shepard and Stephanides were also executive producers.

=== Casting ===
Anna Akana voiced Daisy in this series and would also do so in the main show. Additionally, Brianna Baker voiced Alex, Anika Noni Rose voiced Nut, and Estelle was a guest star as Verus.

== Reception ==
Reception to the show has been mixed. Joyce Slaton on Common Sense Media called the humor mature and filled with "iffy topics," and strong language, with the protagonists, Daisy and Alex, doing drugs, drinking, and joking about smoking pot. She noted that one of the pair, Daisy, woke up "with a woman in her bed" and vomiting after an "intense hangover," while describing their battles with creatures "played for laughs," along with bursts of sci-fi/fantasy and blood. She said that the protagonists often treat people with kindness while villains are "dispatched quickly and with no emotions," saying that both protagonists have atypical "body types for anime," wearing costumes modeled on Sailor Moon, and noted the "agreeably loopy surreal fantasy" of the show.
