= Luke Eisner =

American actor and singer

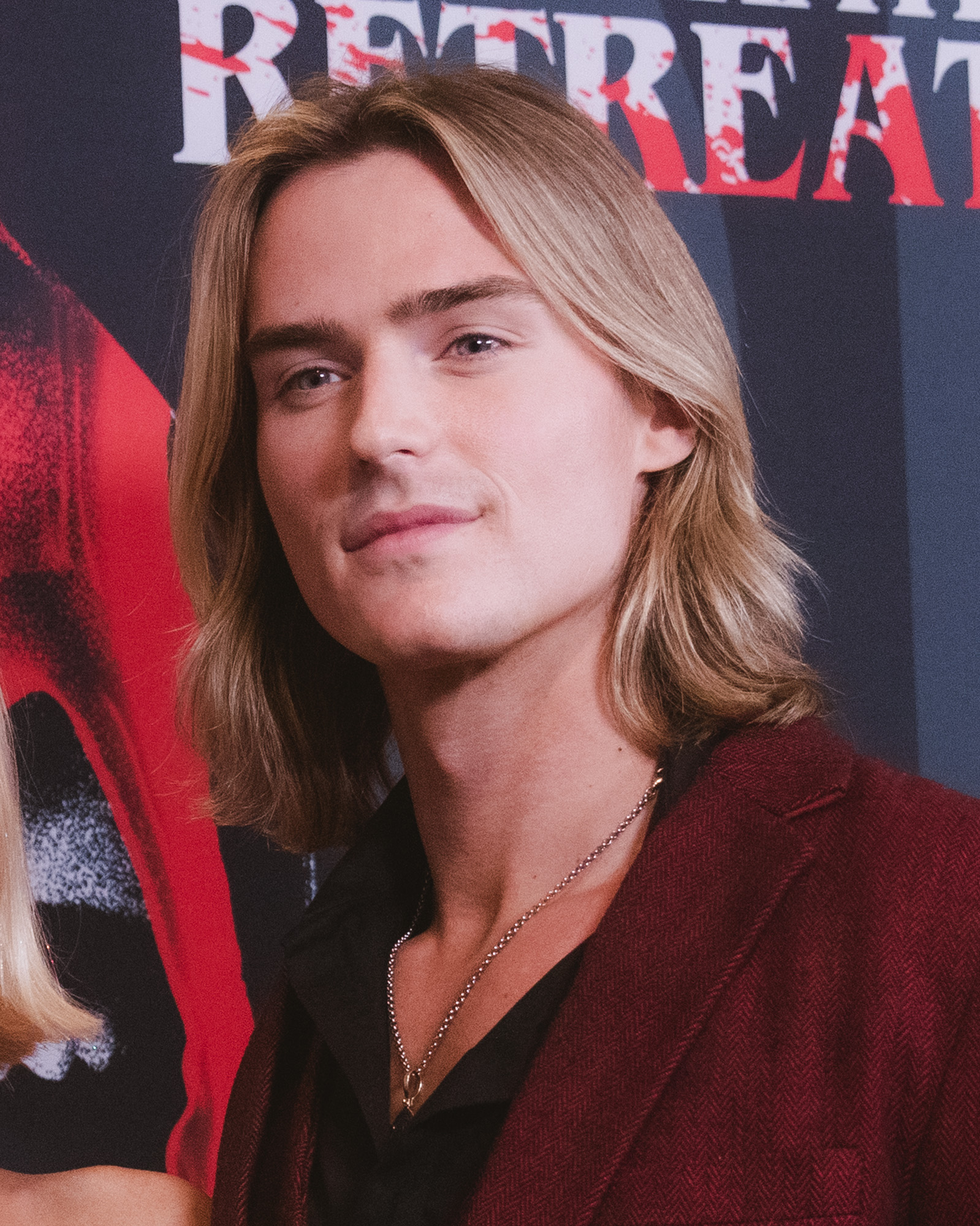
- Eisner in 2026
- Born: August 1, 1996 (age 30); Greendale, Wisconsin
- Occupations: Actor, singer, songwriter
- Years active: 2014–present

Luke Eisner (born August 1, 1996) is an American singer, actor, and songwriter. He is best known for his role as Stig in Tall Girl and Tall Girl 2. He is also a member of the pop duo VOILÀ. He was nominated for a Children's and Family Emmy Award for his songwriting in The J Team.

== Biography ==
He was born on August 1, 1996 in Greendale, Wisconsin, to a father who was an advertising executive. He has stated that he grew up in a very sports-focused town, but at first wanted to become an author, growing up reading Nicholas Sparks books. He subsequently decided to become a musician and an actor. He was bullied while growing up. In 2013, he won Wisconsin Young Entrepeneur of the Year for his DJing business. He was also valedictorian of his high school.

He attended the University of Southern California, where he met Gus Ross. Ross and Eisner soon became known as the pop duo VOILÀ. They have since opened for Kesha and The Fray.

He has stated that during a haircut, his barber suggested that he become a model and sent him to a modeling agency, which began his work in Hollywood. He subsequently signed to IMG Models after appearing in an American Eagle ad. In 2019, he appeared on an episode of The Goldbergs.

In 2019, he made his film debut as Stig in Tall Girl. He subsequently also had his song "Stand Tall", which had been previously released as a single, in the movie. He has stated that after the movie, people recognized him in the grocery store.

In 2020, VOILÀ released their single "Trouble in Paradise" and their album Long Story Short.

In 2021, he served as the on-screen vocal coach for Peacock competition show Siwas Dance Pop Revolution. He also worked as a songwriter for The J Team, which led to his 2022 Children's and Family Emmy Award for Outstanding Musical Direction and Composition for a Live Action Program nomination as a part of the team.

In 2022, he reprised his role as Stig in Tall Girl 2. His song "Figure You Out" was in the movie. He stated that this film let him let his "goofy side" out. He also spent time preparing, studying Swedish accents and working out.

In March 2026, he was announced to be appearing as recurring character Koya, the best friend of Noah Beck's character, on the 2026-2027 Baywatch reboot. Also in 2026, VOILÀ had its first headline tour of Australia, which they stated sold out in 48 hours.

He is set to appear on an upcoming movie based on the book The Upside of Unrequited. As of March 2026 he was set to appear in upcoming romantic comedy Goodbye Girl, in an upcoming thriller directed by Michael Polish, and on a superhero movie.

He volunteers with domestic violence shelters, and has since he was young.
