= Anna Akana =

American YouTuber, actress and comedian (born 1989)

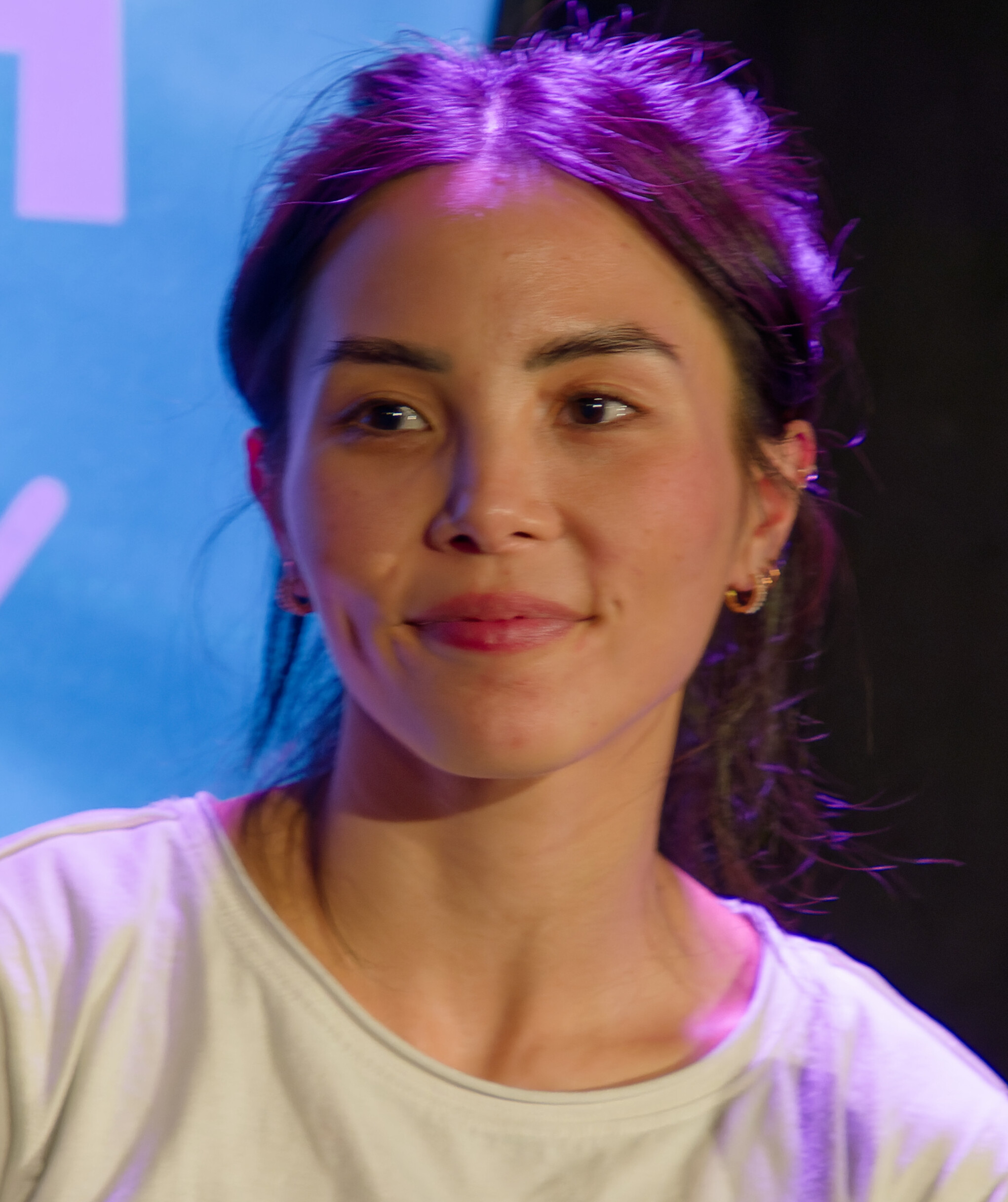
- Akana at the 2024 Edinburgh Festival Fringe
- Born: Anna Kay Napualani Akana; August 18, 1989 (age 37); Monterey County, California, U.S.
- Occupations: YouTuber; comedian; actress; filmmaker; musician
- Years active: 2009–present

YouTube information
- Channel: Anna Akana
- Years active: 2011–present
- Genres: Comedy; mental health; music; vlogging
- Subscribers: 2.81 million
- Views: 384 million
- Last updated: July 21, 2026
- Website: annaakana.com

Anna Kay Napualani Akana (born August 18, 1989) is an American YouTuber, comedian, actress, filmmaker, and musician. She has appeared in TV series, web series, films, and music videos that include Katy Perry's "Last Friday Night (T.G.I.F.)" (2011), Ant-Man (2015), Big City Greens (2018–present), Amphibia (2019–2022), Magical Girl Friendship Squad (2020), and Blade of the 47 Ronin (2022).

In 2015, she launched a clothing line called Ghost & Stars. She is the author of So Much I Want to Tell You: Letters to My Little Sister (2017), in which she describes her struggles and experiences from her sister's suicide to her celebrity status.

== Early life ==
Akana was born in Monterey County, California on August 18, 1989.

Akana's father was an officer in the United States Marine Corps, including during her childhood. Her father moved every few years to a new state or country. In a 2020 interview, she said that she loved Sailor Moon, Inuyasha, and Ranma ½, expressing her surprise that her father would let her watch Tenchi Muyo! with him despite its "perverted" nature. Her father stated that she loved shows like The Powerpuff Girls, animation in general, and anime, the latter especially because she spent "four years growing up in Japan".

On February 14, 2007, Akana's younger sister, Kristina, died by suicide at age 13. Two years later, Akana watched Margaret Cho perform on a Comedy Central special and laughed for the first time since her sister's death, seeing it as a means of trying to move on with her life, and she decided to seriously pursue comedy after. Akana has been vocal about her sister's suicide and is a strong advocate for suicide prevention. In 2013, Akana uploaded a YouTube video, "please don't kill yourself", in which she explains how it felt for her to have a family member die by suicide. In that same year, she released a book, Surviving Suicide, which contains her journal entries from the two years after her sister's death.

== Career ==
Akana first started performing comedy at age 19 but switched to YouTube videos in 2011 after experiencing panic attacks and anxiety before going on stage.

=== YouTube ===
Akana creates both comedy and documentary YouTube videos. In 2014, Akana was listed on New Media Rockstars Top 100 Channels, ranked at #72. In that same year, Akana attempted to make one short film a month. She created and starred in six short films. Akana has starred in various other short films, and she has since continued to create short films. In 2014, Akana formed a comedy music duo, Cat Benatar, with fellow comedian and writer Megan Rosati.

In reviewing her video, "Why Guys Like Asian Girls" (which references "Yellow Fever", a term for an Asian fetish), Cate Matthews of The Huffington Post wrote: "A step-by-step takedown of 'yellow fever' or the desire to date Asian women often accompanied by bizarre, offensive attempts to do so, could start the healing. Luckily for us, YouTuber Anna Akana was more than up to the video-making task." In reviewing her video, "How to Deal with a Breakup", MTV wrote: "In this sketch, comedian Anna Akana envisions the flurry of activity inside the cranial command center of a newly single dumpee."

One of her short films, Miss Earth, was partially financed by Brian Grazer and Ron Howard's production company, New Form Digital. It was part of the 2014 Incubator, a series to showcase and produce original stories by YouTube Creators and filmmakers. Miss Earth was later adapted into a web series, Miss 2059, and released on Verizon's go90 app in June 2016, with a second season released in late 2017.

Akana executive produced and starred as the lead role in the original comedy-drama web television series Youth & Consequences, created by Jason Ubaldi and released in March 2018 on YouTube Red. She is also the host of the web series Crash Course Business: Entrepreneurship beginning in August 2019. On October 10, 2019, she was featured in a 30-minute YouTube documentary created by SoulPancake in collaboration with Funny or Die wherein a variety of comedians discuss mental health called Laughing Matters.

Deadline Hollywood referred to Akana as "a prolific online creator whose channel boasts 60 million views and 900,000 subscribers, and last year wrote and starred in her own narrative feature Riley Rewind, scoring a none-too-shabby 20M views online."

=== Film and television ===
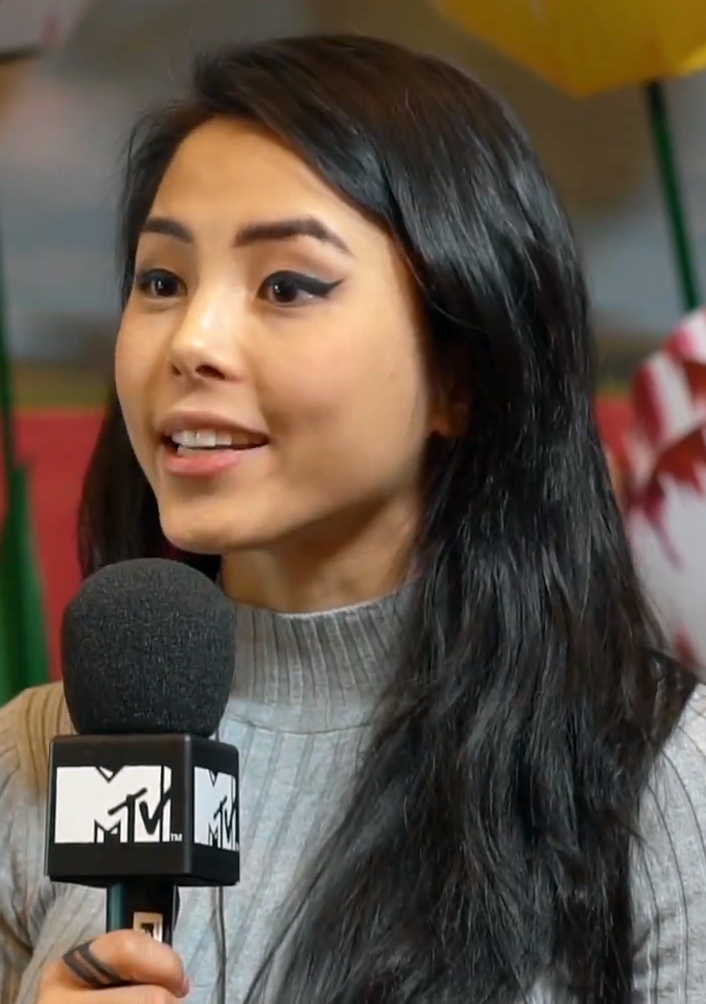
Akana in 2018

In 2011, Akana appeared in the TV series Awkward. In that same year, she appeared as an extra in Katy Perry's "Last Friday Night" music video. Akana starred in Snapper Hero, a scripted video series distributed via Snapchat. The series was sponsored by AT&T.

In 2016, Akana appeared alongside Sally Field in the indie comedy film Hello, My Name Is Doris, written by Michael Showalter. That same year, she appeared in a short Star Wars fan film, Hoshino as well as the comedy film Dirty 30. She had a recurring role in the Comedy Central show Corporate as Paige.

Akana has supporting voice roles as Gloria Sato in the Disney Channel show Big City Greens and Sasha Waybright in Amphibia. In 2020, she played a voice role as lead character Daisy in Magical Girl Friendship Squad and its pilot series, part of Syfy's former midnight adult animation block, TZGZ. In 2019, she announced on Ryan Higa's Off the Pill podcast to be part of the Netflix original Jupiter's Legacy. Akana also hosted the podcast Explain Things to Me with fellow comedian Brad Gage where the two interview experts in various fields about their work. In 2021, Akana appeared in the romantic comedy About Fate.

== Other ventures ==
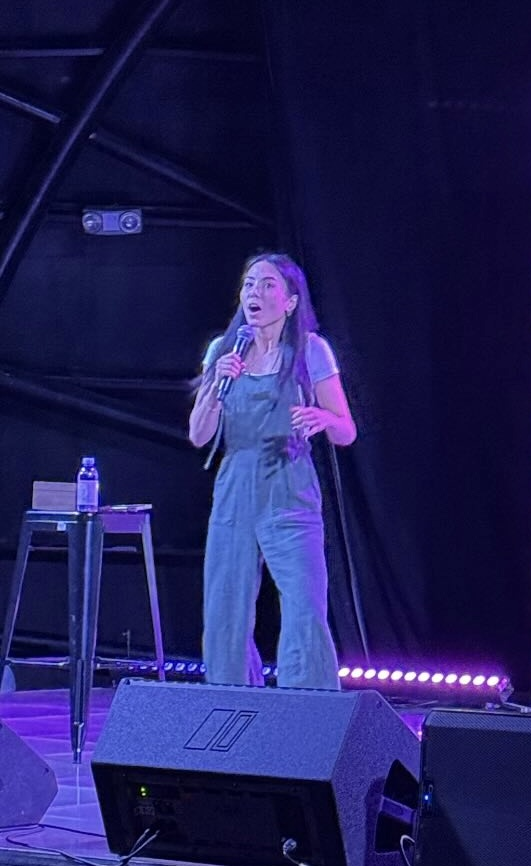
Akana in Manila in 2025 for It Gets Darker

In 2015, Akana released a clothing line, Ghost & Stars, which features several cat-themed designs as well as formal dresses, leggings, and a variety of T-shirts. In 2017, Akana's book So Much I Want to Tell You: Letters to My Little Sister was published. The book describes Akana's struggles and experiences growing up and offers advice to her late sister.

In 2019, Akana transitioned from comedy into music, and released her debut single, "Intervention". Its music video was directed by Auden Bui. She has since released two more music videos, one for "Pretty Girls Don't Cry" in July 2019 and "Not My Proudest Moment" in August. She continued to release music videos for songs named "Alone Together", "Disappointment", and "Let Me Go". Her debut album, Casualty, came out in October 2019. Her follow-up project came out early 2021 called No Longer Yours.

In 2024, Akana rolled out her standup comedy tour It Gets Darker with an entire hour dedicated to telling stories about her sister's suicide, her history with stalkers causing her to quit live appearances, and growing up as a Hawaiian-native Asian military brat.

== Personal life ==
Akana is of Japanese, Filipina, Native Hawaiian and European descent.

Akana was in a relationship with YouTuber Ray William Johnson from 2012 to 2014. The two lived together and collaborated on the web series Riley Rewind and the podcast Runaway Thoughts. In a 2015 interview with Rhett and Link, she attributed their breakup partly to differences in their professional and financial standing. She also jokingly described herself as a "serial monogamist".

In October 2018, she came out as bisexual at the 8th Streamy Awards during her acceptance speech for the Best Acting in a Drama for the series Youth & Consequences, saying she was "not only a woman of colour, but...also a queer woman" and asked people to vote in the U.S. midterm elections that year. She later stated on social media that she had not intended to come out publicly and only did so because she was "very inebriated," confirmed that she was bisexual, and thanked everyone for the support.

In an interview with Billboard in May 2019, Akana said that after coming out, no one made a "big deal out of it" and she realized "how much internalized homophobia" she had, noting that many people in her life were "grossly supportive," saying that visibility for the LGBTQ community, including among transgender, asexual, and bisexual people, was important. She stated that she had been dealing with racial erasure, but after coming out, she experienced bisexual erasure. In an interview with Women's Health, Akana told her story of having her first crush on another girl at the age of 11 and being taunted by a friend about how she was "just trying to be interesting", which made her internalize the fabrication that she was a straight girl showing attraction to other girls just for attention.

In May 2019, Akana revealed that she had an abortion when she was 20, stated that it was one of the best decisions she had ever made, and asserted that "no one should be forced into a situation as serious as pregnancy," adding that "abortion is healthcare" and stated that voting is a way for people to retain their bodily autonomy.

== Filmography ==
=== Feature films ===
| Year | Title | Role | Notes |
|---|---|---|---|
| 2013 | Inappropriate Comedy | Student driver | |
| 2014 | Here She Is | Miss Hawaii | Also writer |
| 2015 | Ant-Man | Writer in Luis's story | |
| 2015 | Kids vs Monsters | Daisy | |
| 2016 | Hello, My Name Is Doris | Blogger | |
| 2016 | Dirty 30 | Ashley Driscoll | |
| 2017 | You Get Me | Lydia | |
| 2018 | Next Gen | Ani | Voice |
| 2019 | Go Back to China | Sasha Li | |
| 2019 | Let It Snow | Kerry | |
| 2020 | Hooking Up | Elizabeth Carthright | |
| 2021 | So Much | TBA | Television film; pre-production |
| 2022 | Blade of the 47 Ronin | Luna | Netflix original film |
| 2024 | Big City Greens the Movie: Spacecation | Gloria Sato, additional voices | Voice |
| TBA | Thud † | | Post-production |

=== Television ===
| Year | Title | Role | Notes |
|---|---|---|---|
| 2011 | Awkward | Asian girl | Episode: "Knocker Nightmare" |
| 2012 | Shake It Up | Tomoka | Episode: "Made in Japan" |
| 2012 | The Beauty Inside | Alex #29 | 5 episodes |
| 2013–2014 | The Fosters | Lily | 2 episodes |
| 2016 | Adam Ruins Everything | Female Shopper | Episode: "Adam Ruins Shopping Malls" |
| 2017 | Stitchers | Amanda Weston | Recurring role; 7 episodes |
| 2018–2020 | Corporate | Paige | Recurring role |
| 2018–present | Big City Greens | Gloria Sato | Voice, main role |
| 2019–2022 | Amphibia | Sasha Waybright | Voice, main role |
| 2020 | Magical Girl Friendship Squad: Origins | Daisy | Voice, main role |
| 2020 | Magical Girl Friendship Squad | Daisy | Voice, main role |
| 2020 | Dicktown | Meg | 3 episodes |
| 2020 | Into the Dark | Julie | Episode: "My Valentine" |
| 2020 | NCIS: Los Angeles | Rhea Moretti | Episode: "Murder of Crows" |
| 2020–2023 | A Million Little Things | Dakota | 5 episodes |
| 2021 | Jupiter's Legacy | Raikou | 2 episodes |
| 2021 | Home Economics | Lindsay | Episode: "Chorizo with Mojo Verde and Chicharrón, $45" |
| 2023, 2025 | Moon Girl and Devil Dinosaur | Odessa Drake | Voice, 2 episodes |
| 2025 | Adventure Time: Fionna and Cake | Fennel | Voice, 5 episodes |
| 2026 | 9-1-1: Nashville | Elena | 2 episodes |
| 2026 | Chibiverse | Gloria Sato | Voice, episode: "Star Butterfly Effect" |
| 2026 | Chibiverse | Sasha Waybright | Voice, episode: "Star Butterfly Effect" |
| 2026 | Clara and the Below | Clara | Voice, lead role |

=== Video games ===
| Year | Title | Role | Notes |
|---|---|---|---|
| 2020 | Beyond Blue | Mirai | |

=== Web series ===
| Year | Title | Role | Notes |
|---|---|---|---|
| 2011 | Breaking Los Angeles | Video Hoe, Herself | 10 episodes; also producer |
| 2011 | 10 Second Traumas | Various | 8 episodes; also writer, executive producer and director |
| 2012 | Pointy Teeth | Anna | Episode: "Pilot" |
| 2013 | Riley Rewind | Riley Brown | 5 episodes; also writer and producer |
| | Runaway Thoughts Podcast | 85 episodes, also writer and producer | |
| 2015 | 52 Ways to Break Up | Anna | Episode: "#24 and #25- Compare Notes" |
| 2015 | Command Center | Commander | Also writer and director |
| 2015 | Broken People | Pinches | 2 episodes |
| 2015 | Last Moments of Relationships | Fay | Episode: "CRAZY DATING STORIES" |
| 2015 | Stunted | Nora | |
| 2015 | Oscar's Hotel for Fantastical Creatures | The White Spirit | Episode: "Art Attack" |
| 2015 | Wrestling Isn't Wrestling | Batista | Short film |
| 2015 | Adult Wednesday Addams | Mackenzie Mae | Executive producer (2 episodes) |
| 2015 | Rough Day | Detective Mah-jong | Also executive producer |
| 2015 | MisSpelled | Stella | Episode: "#HotlineWing" |
| 2015 | #Cybriety | Ellen | Episode: "Neighbor Ellen" |
| 2016 | Hipsters | Jane | 3 episodes; also director |
| 2016 | Tiny Feminists | Ms. Applebaum | Episode: "Linda" |
| 2016 | This Isn't Working | Nicole | 5 episodes |
| 2016 | Transformers: Combiner Wars | Victorion | Voice, 4 episodes |
| 2016 | Single by 30 | Grace | 6 episodes |
| 2016 | 12 Deadly Days | Judalina | Episode: "Coffee Cups" |
| 2016 | Go-Go Boy Interrupted | - | Co-producer (10 episodes) |
| 2016 | Miss 2059 | Victoria Young | 24 episodes; also creator, executive producer and director |
| 2017 | Drive Share | Driver | Episode: "Garbage Mommy" |
| 2017 | Search Bar | Various | 12 episodes; also creator, executive producer and director |
| 2018 | Youth & Consequences | Farrah Cutney | 8 episodes; also creator and executive producer |
| 2019 | Crash Course: Entrepreneurship | Self (Host) | 18 episodes |

== Discography ==
=== Studio albums ===
| Title | Details |
|---|---|
| Casualty | Released: October 4, 2019; Format: Digital download, Streaming; Label: JENGA Productions |

=== Extended plays ===
| Title | Details |
|---|---|
| No Longer Yours | Released: February 19, 2021; Format: Digital download, streaming; Label: Hello Hello Love |

=== Singles ===
| Title | Year | Album |
|---|---|---|
| "Intervention" | 2019 | Casualty |
| "Alone Together" | 2019 | Casualty |
| "Pretty Girls Don't Cry" | 2019 | Casualty |
| "Not My Proudest Moment" | 2019 | Casualty |
| "Disappointment" | 2019 | Casualty |
| "Let Me Go" | 2019 | Casualty |
| "Casualty" | 2019 | Casualty |
| "Bad News | 2019 | Casualty |
| "Spoken For" | 2019 | Casualty |
| "Selfish | 2020 | Casualty |
| "Quicksand | 2020 | Casualty |
| "Pick a Fight" | 2020 | Casualty |
| "Swim" | 2020 | No Longer Yours |
| "Pink" | 2020 | No Longer Yours |
| "Run" | 2021 | No Longer Yours |
| "I Feel Nothing" | 2021 | No Longer Yours |
| "Wanted Woman" (featuring Macedo) | 2021 | Non-album singles |
| "Sunshine" | 2022 | Non-album singles |
| "Good Girl" (featuring Macedo) | 2022 | Non-album singles |
| "Until Further Notice" | 2022 | Non-album singles |
| "Your Girlfriend Is Not My Problem" | 2023 | TBA |
| "Self Control" | 2023 | TBA |
| "Like Beyoncé" | 2024 | TBA |
| "Coming for Blood" | 2025 | TBA |

=== Promotional singles ===
| Title | Year | Album |
|---|---|---|
| "Screw You" | 2012 | Non-album promotional singles |
| "Mad Love" | 2012 | Non-album promotional singles |
| "Against the Darkness" | 2012 | Non-album promotional singles |
| "Lost Dreams" (featuring Jesse Cale) | 2013 | Non-album promotional singles |
| "Need You Now" (from "A Million Little Things: Season 2") | 2020 | Non-album promotional singles |
| "Everything's Gotta Change" (from "A Million Little Things: Season 2") | 2020 | Non-album promotional singles |
| "You Can't Always Get What You Want" (from "A Million Little Things: Season 3") | 2021 | Non-album promotional singles |

=== Other appearances ===
| Title | Year | Other artist(s) | Album |
|---|---|---|---|
| "Heartstomper" | 2021 | —N/a | Amphibia: Battle of the Bands |
| "No Big Deal" | 2021 | Brenda Song, Haley Tju | Amphibia: Battle of the Bands |
| "Euthanasia" | 2022 | Daemon | Blade of the 47 Robin |

=== Music videos ===
| Title | Year | Director |
|---|---|---|
| "Screw You" | 2012 | Will Akana |
| "Intervention" | 2019 | Auden Bui |
| "Alone Together" | 2019 | Maggie Levin |
| "Pretty Girls Don't Cry" | 2019 | Maggie Levin |
| "Not My Proudest Moment" | 2019 | Jackson Adams |
| "Disappointment" | 2019 | Hazel Hayes |
| "Let Me Go" | 2019 | Auden Bui |
| "Casualty" | 2019 | |
| "Bad News" | 2019 | |
| "Spoken For" | 2019 | Auden Bui |
| "Selfish" | 2020 | |
| "Quicksand" | 2020 | Kantu Lentz |
| "Pick a Fight" | 2020 | |
| "Swim" | 2020 | Anna Akana & Auden Bui |
| "Pink" | 2020 | |
| "Run" | 2021 | Auden Bui |
| "I Feel Nothing" | 2021 | Auden Bui |
| "Wanted Woman" | 2021 | Maggie Levin |
| "Sunshine" | 2022 | |
| "Coming For Blood" | 2025 | |

=== Guest appearances ===
| Year | Artist(s) | Title | Role |
|---|---|---|---|
| 2011 | Katy Perry | "Last Friday Night (T.G.I.F.)" | Extra |

== Awards ==
| Year | Association | Category | Nominated work | Result | Ref. |
|---|---|---|---|---|---|
| 2014 | San Diego Asian Film Festival | Digital Pioneer | | Won | |
| 2015 | Streamy Awards | Best Actress | SnapperHero | Nominated | |
| 2018 | Streamy Awards | Acting in a Drama | Youth & Consequences | Won | |
| 2019 | 46th Daytime Emmy Awards | Outstanding Digital Drama Series | Youth & Consequences | Nominated | |
