= Angela Kinsey =

American actress (born 1971)

- Kinsey in 2026
- Born: Angela Faye Kinsey; June 25, 1971 (age 55); Lafayette, Louisiana, U.S.
- Education: Baylor University (BA)
- Occupation: Actress
- Years active: 1997–present
- Spouses: Warren Lieberstein (m. 2000; div. 2010) Joshua Snyder (m. 2016)
- Children: 1
- Relatives: Paul Lieberstein (former brother-in-law); Susanne Daniels (former sister-in-law)

Angela Faye Kinsey (born June 25, 1971) is an American actress. She played Angela Martin in the sitcom The Office (2005–2013) and appeared in the sitcoms Your Family or Mine (2015) and Haters Back Off (2016–2017). She is a podcast co-host of Office Ladies. Since The Office, Kinsey has appeared in Netflix's Tall Girl, Disney+'s Be Our Chef, A.P. Bio, and as a panelist on MTV's Deliciousness.

== Early years ==
Kinsey was born in Lafayette, Louisiana. When she was two years old, her family moved to Jakarta, Indonesia, where her father worked as a drilling engineer. They lived there for 13 years, and she attended the Jakarta Intercultural School. During this time, she learned Indonesian, a language she still occasionally speaks. Her family returned to the United States and settled in Archer City, Texas when she was 14.

Kinsey studied English at Baylor University, where she became a member of the Chi Omega sorority, "took as many theatre classes as possible," and participated in the "Baylor in London" program.

After graduating from Baylor in 1993, Kinsey served as an intern on the NBC talk show Late Night with Conan O'Brien, which she described as an "awesome" experience. She worked for the show's band leader, drummer Max Weinberg. The experience inspired Kinsey to take a coast-to-coast road trip with a friend from New York City to California. During her time in New York, Kinsey was also an extra on Saturday Night Live.

== Career ==
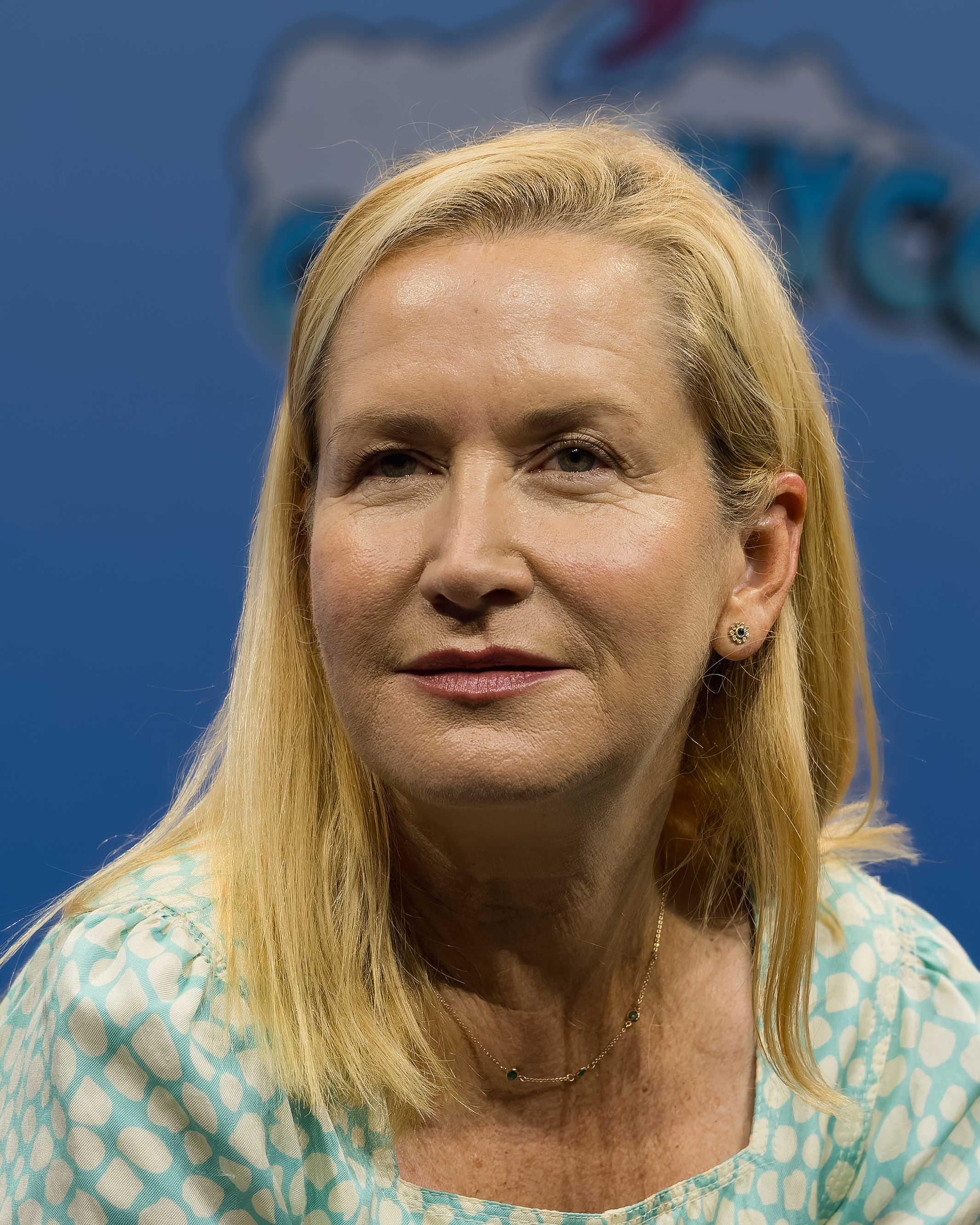
Kinsey at Galaxy Con Raleigh in 2026

Kinsey moved to Los Angeles and took improvisation classes with The Groundlings and at iO West (formerly known as "Improv Olympic West"). Following a two-woman show at iO, she was an operator at 1-800-Dentist and made small one-episode appearances in various sitcoms. She voiced the character "Angela" on two episodes of King of the Hill. In early 2005, she auditioned for the role of receptionist Pam Beesly for the American version of The Office. After producers told her she was "a little too feisty for Pam" she was called back to audition for the role of Angela Martin, which she won. She also appeared on Monk as murderer Arlene Boras in "Mr. Monk and the Naked Man" (2007) and "Mr. Monk's 100th Case" (2008).

In June 2007, Kinsey shared in the Daytime Emmy Award "Outstanding Broadband Program – Comedy", for her work on The Office: Accountants, which is a series of webisodes.

Kinsey is one of several cast members of The Office to have a role in License to Wed, a film directed by Ken Kwapis, who often directed episodes of The Office. Kinsey updated her MySpace blog with behind-the-scenes anecdotes of upcoming episodes of the series. She also took to organizing The Office cast outings: "I remember watching Friends and thinking, 'They really enjoy each other.' We, in fact, hang out."

In Summer 2011, she became the new spokesperson for Clairol hair products, appearing in television ads for Clairol Nice 'n Easy. In 2013, she guest-starred in New Girl. Since 2014, Kinsey has starred in the Hulu comedy series The Hotwives, returning for season two on August 18, 2015. That same year, she starred in the film All-Stars with Lance Kinsey (no relation).

Kinsey stars in the Netflix original series Haters Back Off as Bethany, the mother of the main character Miranda Sings. She appears alongside YouTube star Colleen Ballinger, as Miranda, and Steve Little, as Miranda's uncle Jim. While the first season was met with mixed reviews, Kinsey received critical acclaim for her performance. In 2019, Kinsey starred in the Netflix film Tall Girl and plays the mom to Ava Michelle's main character Jodi.

In 2020, Kinsey appeared as the host of Disney+'s Be Our Chef and as a panelist on MTV's Deliciousness.

On September 11, 2019, Kinsey announced via Twitter that she and Jenna Fischer would be co-hosting a weekly podcast called Office Ladies. According to Fischer's announcement, she and Kinsey "watch an episode of The Office and give you all the stories and behind-the-scenes scoop...as well as some BFF banter about our lives." The first episode of Office Ladies was released October 16, 2019. The podcast is still airing as of February 2024, with appearances from The Office's cast and crew. The podcast won Podcast of the Year at the iHeartRadio Podcast Awards 2021.

In 2021, Kinsey announced that she would be releasing a book, Office BFFs: Tales of The Office from Two Best Friends Who Were There, with former co-star Jenna Fischer, which was released in 2022.

== Personal life ==
On June 18, 2000, she married writer and producer Warren Lieberstein. He is the brother of Paul Lieberstein, who played Toby Flenderson on The Office. She gave birth to their daughter in May 2008. On February 18, 2009, Kinsey and her husband separated. Her representative stated that the two continue to be friends. In June 2010, it was announced that Kinsey had filed for divorce, citing "irreconcilable differences".

On August 4, 2016, Kinsey announced her engagement to her long-term boyfriend, actor and baker Joshua Snyder. She is the step-mother to his two sons. On November 13, 2016, Kinsey married Joshua Snyder. Together, they have a YouTube channel and website called Baking with Josh & Ange.

Kinsey is best friends with her former co-star Jenna Fischer. They have collaborated on many projects, including their podcast Office Ladies.

Kinsey is Presbyterian. She has said her grandmother does not watch The Office because she feels the protagonist Michael Scott is too "vulgar". Kinsey said, "She'll say to me, 'Baby, we're so proud of you, I'm proud of you, but I do not care for the show and I do not watch it.'"

Kinsey supports Alley Cat Allies, a nonprofit advocacy organization dedicated to cats.

== Filmography ==
=== Film ===
Year	Title	Role	Notes
2004	Career Suicide	Tammy	Short film
2007	License to Wed	Judith the Jewelry Clerk	
2009	Tripping Forward	Jennifer	
2010	Furry Vengeance	Felder	
2012	Struck by Lightning	Counselor	
2012	The Bluegrass Brainwash Conspiracy	Hillbilly	Short film
2014	All Stars	Debbie Shipman	
2016	Hot Bot	Candy Huffington	
2016	Slash	Anglaxia Supremacy IV	
2016	Laid in America	Lisa	
2017	Swing State	Susan Davis	
2017	Blacked Out	Jen	Short film. Also writer
2017	Andover	Helen	
2018	Half Magic	Eva	
2018	Sherry	Sherry	Short film
2019	Extracurricular Activities	Mrs. Wallace	
2019	I Didn't Like Hubert	Narrator	Short film
2019	Tall Girl	Helaine Kreyman	
2019	Adams	Karen	Short film
2020	Keep Hope Alive	Heather Heath	
2022	Tall Girl 2	Helaine Kreyman	
2025	Nimrods		

=== Television ===
Year	Title	Role	Notes
1997	King of the Hill	Angela (voice)	Season 2; episode 1: "How to Fire a Rifle Without Really Trying"
1998	King of the Hill	Angela (voice)	Season 3; episode 6: "Peggy's Pageant Fever". Uncredited role
1998	Step by Step	Simone	Season 7; episode 12: "Goin' to the Chapel"
2002	King of the Hill	(voice)	Season 6; episode 6: "I'm with Cupid"
2003	Run of the House	Maxine	Episode 3: "The Party"
2003	All of Us	Blanche Whitefish	Season 1; episode 8: "Tia Moves In"
2005–2013	The Office	Angela Martin	Main role. Seasons 1–9; 188 episodes
2006	The Office: The Accountants	Angela Martin	Main role. Miniseries; 10 episodes
2007	Mind of Mencia	Hillary Clinton	Season 3; episode 9
2007–2008	Monk	Arlene Boras	Season 6; episode 3, & season 7; episode 7
2008	The Office: The Outburst	Angela Martin	Episodes 1–4
2009	The Office: Blackmail	Angela Martin	Episodes 2–4: "Andy", "Kelly" & "Pay Day"
2009	A Temporary Life	Rachel	Television film
2010	The Office: The Mentor	Angela Martin	Series regular. Miniseries; episodes 1–4
2010	American Dad!	Mia (voice)	Season 5; episode 15: "Merlot Down Dirty Shame"
2010	The Office: The 3rd Floor	Angela Martin	Episode 2: "Lights, Camera, Action!"
2010	Yo Gabba Gabba!	Herself - Teacher	Season 3; episode 1: "School"
2011	The Office: The Podcast	Angela Martin	Episode 2: "The First Entry"
2012	First Dates with Toby Harris	April	Season 1; episode 5: "Foreplay"
2012	New Year's Eve with Carson Daly	Herself - Co-Host	Television Special
2013	Wilfred	Heather Williger	Season 3; episode 1: "Uncertainty"
2013	The Gabriels	Gail Gabriel	Series pilot
2013–2014	New Girl	Rose	Recurring role. Season 3; episodes 2, 13 & 22, & season 4; episode 5
2013–2016	Hollywood Game Night	Herself	Season 1; episode 7, season 2; episode 9, & season 4; episode 6
2014	Hot in Cleveland	Mrs. Carson	Season 5; episode 3: "Dr. Who?"
2014	The Hotwives of Orlando	Crystal Simmons	Hulu series. Episodes 1–7
2014–2015	Bad Judge	Michelle	Episodes 7, 8, 10 & 13
2014–2016	Celebrity Name Game	Herself - Celebrity Player	Seasons 1–3; 8 episodes
2015	Zombie Basement	Sheila	Episodes 1 & 2: "Pilot" & "Zombie Makeover"
2015	Impress Me	Annie Marshall	9 episodes
2015	Your Family or Mine	Claire	Series regular. 6 episodes
2015	The 46 Percenters	Marni	Television film
2015	The Hotwives of Las Vegas	Stephanie / First Lady	Episodes 1–7
2016	PYPO Park Bench Mistakes	Anna	Television film
2016	The Crossroads of History	Connie	Episode 2: "Lincoln"
2016	Uncle Buck	Sandy	Episode 3: "Ride Along"
2016	Blunt Talk	(unknown)	Season 2; episode 6: "Love Is Not Linear"
2016	The 5th Quarter	Tia Cantari	Season 1; episode 2: "Selling Out: The Frank Cushman Story"
2016–2017	The Real O'Neals	Shelia DeMars	Season 2; episodes 8 & 12: "The Real Christmas" & "The Real Brother's Keeper"
2016–2017	Haters Back Off	Bethany	Series regular. Seasons 1 & 2; 16 episodes
2017	Life in Pieces	Ruth	Season 2; episode 13: "Chef Rescue Negotiator Necklace"
2017	Real Rob	Karen	Season 2; episode 2: "Priorities"
2018	A.P. Bio	Brenda	Season 1; episode 10: "Durbin Crashes"
2018	Terror in the Woods	Dani	Television film
2018	Splitting Up Together	Jeannie Johnson	Season 2; episode 3: "We Need to Talk About Karen"
2018	Fresh Off the Boat	Amy Chestnut	Season 4; episodes 15, 18 & 19, & season 5; episode 7
2018	How May We Hate You?	Dana	Television film
2019	Miracle Workers	Gail	Season 1; episodes 1 & 7: "2 Weeks" & "1 Hour"
2020	Be Our Chef	Herself - Host	Episodes 1–11
2020	BlackAF	Leeza	Episodes 4–6
2020	Never Have I Ever	Vivian	Recurring role. Season 1; episodes 6, 8 & 10
2020	Home Movie: The Princess Bride	Vizzini	Miniseries; episode 3: "Chapter Three: The Cliffs of Insanity"
2020–2021	Deliciousness	Herself - Panelist	MTV series. Seasons 1 & 2; 20 episodes
2022	Better Things	Fredericka	Season 5; episodes 1 & 10: "F*ck Anatoly's Mom" & "We Are Not Alone"
2024	Confessions of a Christmas Letter	Settie Rose	Television film
2026	Shifting Gears	Lynn	Season 2; episode 13: "Surprise"

== Awards and nominations ==
Year	Award	Category	Work	Result
2007	Daytime Emmy Awards	Outstanding Broadband Program – Comedy	The Office: The Accountants	Won
2007	Screen Actors Guild	Outstanding Performance by an Ensemble in a Comedy Series	The Office	Won
2008	Screen Actors Guild	Outstanding Performance by an Ensemble in a Comedy Series	The Office	Won
2008	TV Land Awards	Future Classic	The Office	Won
2020	Shorty Awards	Best Podcaster (with Jenna Fischer)	Office Ladies	Nominated
