= Magical Girl Friendship Squad =

Animated television series

- Genre: Animated comedy Magical girl
- Created by: Kelsey Stephanides
- Written by: Hallie Cantor
- Directed by: Erica Perez; K Downs
- Starring: Quinta Brunson; Anna Akana; Ana Gasteyer; Matteo Lane; Christine Baranski; Manny Jacinto; Helen Hong; Eric Bauza; Sarah Sherman
- Country of origin: United States
- Original language: English
- No. of seasons: 1
- No. of episodes: 6

Production
- Executive producers: Hallie Cantor; James Belfer; Adam Belfer; Max Benator
- Running time: 15 minutes
- Production companies: Cartuna; TZGZ Productions

Original release
- Network: Syfy
- Release: September 26 – October 31, 2020

Related
- Magical Girl Friendship Squad: Origins

Magical Girl Friendship Squad is an American adult animated magical girl sitcom created by Kelsey Stephanides and starring Anna Akana and Quinta Brunson. It follows two directionless young women named Alex and Daisy, who must figure out how to save the universe using the superpowers bestowed upon them. The series, consisting of six 11-minute episodes, premiered on Syfy's late night programming block TZGZ on September 26, 2020.

== Plot ==
Alex (Brunson) and Daisy (Akana), two millennial women, are given the duty of protecting the universe while getting their lives together and paying rent to their demanding landlord.

== Characters ==
=== Main ===
- Alex (voiced by Quinta Brunson), a millennial black woman who thinks of becoming a barista at a local coffee shop before meeting Nut. Her magical powers are stored in her birth control.
- Daisy (voiced by Anna Akana), Alex's stoner friend and roommate. Despite having antiheroic qualities, she bonds with Alex over loving the John Wick franchise. She has allegedly slept with all the baristas at the local coffee shop, including Michaela and the No Tattoo Barista. Her ex-girlfriend, Yolanda, is revealed to be working at the urgent care clinic in the show's fourth episode. She stores her powers in a Tom Selleck bong she calls "Bong Selleck".
- Nut (voiced by Ana Gasteyer), a red panda – initially named "Isis" – who gives Daisy and Alex the ability to transform into magical girls, allowing them to work together to "save the universe from otherworldly threats." It is revealed in the show's sixth episode that the villainous Verus was Nut's ex-girlfriend.
- Corvin (voiced by Matteo Lane), Verus' evil henchman. He is part of Arregon, an evil corporation located in Brooklyn and run by Verus. He is fired from Arregon in the fifth episode. In the sixth episode, it is implied that he has a crush on Coffee Dude.

=== Supporting ===
- Verus (voiced by Christine Baranski) is an "icy and efficient omni-universal being." Shown in a cameo in the show's third episode, she is formally introduced in the show's fifth episode, where she, as the evil corporate executive who runs Arregon, fires Corvin. In the show's final episode, it is revealed that Nut is Verus's ex-girlfriend.
- Coffee Dude (voiced by Manny Jacinto) is an optimist on whom Alex has a crush.
- Daisy's mother (voiced by Helen Hong) is part of a fundamentalist religious cult, along with her husband.
- Daisy's father (voiced by Eric Bauza), like his wife, is part of a fundamentalist religious cult.
- Lulu (voiced by Sarah "Squirm" Sherman) is an old lady and landlord who dislikes late rent and millennials.

=== Other characters ===
- The Emptier (voiced by Jason Mantzoukas)
- Gloriana (voiced by Paget Brewster) is a goddess and Nut's sister, with whom she has a strained relationship. She is introduced in the episode "The Real World".
- CBD Monster (voiced by Vella Lovell), which wreaks havoc by using CBD to sap the energy of the patrons at Daisy and Alex's favorite coffee spot. She is the first monster defeated by Daisy and Alex. Although she transforms from her original form as the "No Tattoo Barista", her ultimate fate is not known.
- The Mushroominations (voiced by Patti Harrison), fungal parasites who "keep ego in check" on their home world of Hubris, where everyone is overconfident; this causes an outbreak of low self-esteem and negative self-talk when they propagate throughout the neighborhood via Daisy's infected cut in the episode "Anti Fungal Spit Skanks".
- Nightscreamr (voiced by Jamie Loftus), a "goth bully."
- Yolanda (voiced by Stephanie Sheh), Daisy's ex-girlfriend, who works at an urgent care clinic and was designed as a "cute, classic style anime female character" based on Usagi Tsukino from Sailor Moon and Nurse Joy from Pokémon, according to character designer Marika Cowan. Her character was designed by Cowan and Alyssa Fullerton, a character and prop designer for the show.
- Pansy, who calls herself Daisy's "monogamous live-in girlfriend." She only exists in the dimension created by Gloriana, as shown in "The Real World."

== Episodes ==
No.	Title	Directed by	Written by	Original release date	U.S. viewers (millions)
1	"My Fated Guardians"	Erica Perez & K Downs (animation directors)	Hallie Cantor	September 26, 2020	0.300
Nut, a small red panda, arrives in Alex and Daisy's apartment, giving them the ability to change into magical girls from objects, specifically a bong and container of birth control pills. They struggle with how to face this new destiny before them...
2	"The Cool S"	K Downs & Erica Perez (animation directors)	Jamie Loftus	October 3, 2020	0.160
Nut confronts the chaos of her past, while Daisy and Alex try to figure out how they will pay their rent, using their powers to conjure "celebrity trash" which they can sell.
3	"realcontent.crap"	Erica Perez & K Downs (animation directors)	Bri LeRose	October 10, 2020	0.174
Alex starts a new job as part of "Outrage," while Daisy's parents check in and Nut learns the power of trash TV. All three of them work together to stop outrage from gripping people in the basement of an evil corporation.
4	"Anti-Fungal Spit Skanks"	K Downs & Erica Perez (animation directors)	Lorraine DeGraffenreidt	October 17, 2020	0.136
Daisy and Alex realize their inner monologue, the Mushroominations, can be a jerk. While both free themselves from this burden, can they save the city itself before it tears itself apart?
5	"The Real World"	Erica Perez & K Downs (animation directors)	Hallie Cantor	October 24, 2020	0.344
Nut proposes to Daisy and Alex that they clean their apartment. Later, Alex attends a job training seminar, while Daisy finds herself stuck in an alternate dimension created by Nut's sister, Gloriana.
6	"Just Two Weak Girls"	K Downs & Erica Perez (animation directors)	Hallie Cantor	October 31, 2020	0.210
Daisy and Alex begin to drift apart after finding out that they were not destined to be guardians, while the universe itself may be at stake. Later, the past relationship between Nut and Verus is revealed as Daisy and Alex engage in one final battle.

== Production ==
=== Development ===
Magical Girl Friendship Squad was created by Kelsey Stephanides, who is also the showrunner, and is inspired by anime, riffing off the magical girl genre popularized by Sailor Moon and Cardcaptor Sakura. The show was made, according to Stephanides, between the end of 2019 to August 2020, after it was pitched to Syfy, which wanted a polished reboot with "longer episodes." In January 2020, TZGZ, Syfy's new adult animation block, ordered six 15-minute episodes for the series. At the same time, the short-form version, Magical Girl Friendship Squad: Origins, began airing on Syfy's late-night block. Also anime-inspired like the main series, this pilot series was written by Diana McCorry, who created Human Kind Of, and features show's two same protagonists.

Stephanides stated that she was influenced by series such as The Simpsons and Futurama but that they had mostly male casts, making her think about "what a show with a mostly female cast would look like" beginning in 2015. She then decided to make a parody of the magical girl subgenre, using Rick and Morty and Archer as a basis. In the same interview, she stated that the themes of the show are about what it's like "to gain and hold power as a woman today" without losing a part of yourself, building upon the setup of the characters in the pilot series. Furthermore, she stated that the themes of friendship and honesty are key to the series, as is the message that people are stronger when they are "more open" and connect with others. She also hoped that the series expands the "types of new animated stories" with more variety in adult animation. (Note: In her interview with Comic Book Resources, Akana stated that she loved the animation style of the series, saying that she and Brunson were blown away by it, especially the action sequences and detail in the costumes.) She also noted that the show is anime-inspired, not anime itself, despite the number of anime references in the show's backgrounds, while hoping for "different ways" to do adult animation in the future.

In February, all the voiceovers for the show's six episodes were recorded, resulting in Akana getting "really, really sick after recording everything," with Daisy's voice not in her "natural register," making it rough. Some of the recording was finished up in early March just before the pandemic hit. Months later, in early September, Stephanides made similar points as she had in the interview with Comics Beat but added that she wanted to make a "genderbent" version of previous adult animations that was more feminine in its themes, leading her to the magical girl genre, specifically a genre parody. She further noted that because of the show she is getting back into watching anime like Kill la Kill, One-Punch Man, and Mob Psycho 100 and stated that the show is trying to modernize the magical girl genre. Additionally, she commented about how it was easy to work with Brunson and Akana, that the red panda was chosen to differentiate from a cat as a magical familiar, the "adjustment period" that Daisy and Alex have to go through before they become magical girls, and the experience of having Stephanie Sheh do voice work on the show. She hoped, at the same time, this would encourage more networks and platforms to create adult animations like it, while inspiring others to make their own unique shows. The next month, Marika Cowan, character designer of the show, shared her designs for the No Tattoo Barista and her form as the CBD Monster from the show's first episode, noting the fun in designing the character and saying she "referenced a LOT of Sailor Moon monsters when developing her look."

=== Crew ===
The show is produced by Cartuna, a New York animation studio, with each producer having their own style. As Stephanides put it, the show would have been "totally different" if another studio produced it. Erica Perez is the animation director for episodes 1, 3, and 5. K Downs is the animation director for episodes 2, 4, and 6. (Note: Stephanides stated that while McCory was a development producer on the pilot series, with K Downs as the animation director, she worked more with McCory on pilot series, and more with K and her team on the main show.) Cartuna worked with over 100 artists on the series. The animation is done on Adobe Animate, the backgrounds done in Adobe Photoshop, and character design done in both.

Hallie Cantor is the lead writer and co-executive producer with James Belfer, Adam Belfer and Max Benator. The two Belfers are also executive producers on the pilot series. Additionally, Marika Cowan is a character designer. Before the show's official release, Cantor described the show as featuring "dangerously horny teens," "snake demon ex-girlfriends," and other aspects, while noting that all six episodes of the show will be available on Syfy's website with a login, while the first episode will be free to stream on the same website.

In February 2022, Downs described their work on Magical Girl Friendship Squad as "a huge highlight" of their career and a "really fun project" they worked on with their friends.

=== Casting ===
In May 2020, it was announced that Quinta Brunson and Anna Akana were leads of the show's ensemble cast. As Stephanides explained it, Akana voiced Daisy in the pilot series, but that in the main series they wanted to "do a bit more character development," whereas for Brunson it was different. Instead, in the words of Stephanides, she "added a new layer to Alex's personality." Brunson stated that she joined the cast because representation in anime as a black woman was the reason to join in, and that she agreed with all of the material, especially the content about "outrage culture." In September, Matteo Lane said he loved playing a villain like Corvin, noting the magical girl anime influences, and said that a lot is packed in each episode, even saying the character has a "gay voice." He even speculated what totem would allow Corvin to transform if he could do so, while saying that people should take away that there can be diverse representation among superheroes. He also revealed that he had done recordings of his lines three times because of the pandemic and ambient noses in New York City, while hoping that in a possible Season 2 his character would get a boyfriend. The following month, Brunson said that she enjoyed playing the character, calling it a lot of fun, and about the transition from stand-up comedy to voice acting. She also stated that the voice of Alex was not that far removed from her actual voice, while trying to make her more optimistic rather than deadpan, and noted that she was sent an offer to voice this character and did not have to audition for any others.

Taylor Ortega and Daisy Hobbs voiced characters in the show.

=== LGBTQ representation ===
When the series appeared on September 26, named Magical Girl Friendship Squad, with some new cast members and longer episodes, there were LGBTQ characters, like in the pilot series. Daisy is unambiguously queer as she has slept with "every barista" at the local coffee shop. In the second and third episodes of the main show, "The Cool S" and "realcontent.crap", a sticker with the transgender pride flag is shown on Daisy's laptop. She is later shown to have an ex-girlfriend in the fourth episode, "Anti-Fungal Spit Skanks," a classic-style anime character, named Yolanda, who works at an urgent care center in the city. In the episode "The Real World", Pansy, who calls herself Daisy's "monogamous live-in girlfriend", is introduced, but she only exists in the dimension created by Nut's sister, Gloriana. On November 1, 2020, Hallie Cantor, a writer for the show, responded to a question on whether Daisy is trans, stated that they hadn't yet "identified her as trans or cis." Later, K Downs, director for Magical Girl Friendship Squad, jokingly stated that Daisy is lesbian. Anna Akana, who voiced Daisy, said that Daisy is a cisgender bisexual woman like herself, and added that she was frustrated by those who called Daisy trans, saying they were engaging in bisexual erasure.

In 2021, the series was also nominated for "Outstanding Animated Series" category at Autostraddle's 4th Annual Gay Emmys.

== Release ==
On July 24, 2020, members of the show's cast and crew talked about the show in a panel for Comic Con. A number of sneak peeks of the show were also shown at the time. Two months later, on September 16, an exclusive sneak peek of the series was uploaded to the YouTube channel of Syfy.

The series premiered on September 26, 2020, alongside the network's other animated series debut, Wild Life. GLAAD, before the series released, stated that the cast included "out actors Anna Akana and Matteo Lane," with comedian Patti Harrison as a guest star.

== Reception ==
The series received mostly positive critical reception. Complex called the series a cross between Sailor Moon and Broad City, and commented on the "satirical diatribes on internet outrage culture and celebrity." By contrast, The A.V. Club was more critical. They stated that the series spins touted aspects of millennial culture with "anime-inspired lore and imagery," even as it relies on some tropes, and praised the charm of cast, along with the "faintest promise of adventure." However, they stated that the show functions best when lingering "on the show's core friendship," while it does not, in the end, become an animation which is "something special." This contrasted with the assessment by CBR. Their reviewer said that the series shows "plenty of promise," praised the "distinct art style," saying it feels like a "webcomic come to life," with occasional stiff (and jerky) movement. Even so, they argued that the vocal talents of Brunson and Akana complement each other well in this comedic series which has a "mature sense of humor, drug use and language."

Charles Pulliam-Moore of Gizmodo reviewed the series much more positively. He wrote that the series is "equal parts Broad City and Sailor Moon," presenting Alex and Daisy as an unlikely and mismatched duo, even having similar influences to Craig of the Creek or She-Ra and the Princesses of Power, even though it has a different audience. He also writes that the show is adult not because of its "mature content" or humor, but rather because the story's protagonists see their adventures as a way to escape the stress of everyday life, "not just a responsibility they were fated to take up." He concludes by saying that the series makes clear that Alex and Daisy always have a connection to their normal lives where problems await them, with the idea that being an adult is the "singularly most soul-draining thing" that people have to do, something the viewers will have to confront eventually.

Marley Crusch argued that the series protagonists "discover their true power is friendship" and that the series "manages to make a tried and true approach feel new and fun, and boasts the sparkly, colorful visuals to match." She also called the series a "strong contender" for her favorite show of 2020, adding that while the series is a "product of its time," it will remain one of her "favorites for years to come," although saying it is very short.

Jesse Schedeen of IGN called the series a "love letter" to magical girl anime like Sailor Moon and Cardcaptor Sakura, as it is steeped in references and tropes to anime, remixing it through a "distinctly 21st century American pop culture lens." He added that this means that if one does not have some appreciation or are familiar with the anime a bit, the show might not "entirely click", while noting that the two protagonists lampoon and defy millennial stereotypes, and has a positive animation style. He ended by saying that the show resembles a grown-up "anime-influenced Steven Universe" and that the show makes a case for "switching over to Syfy for 15 minutes every Saturday night."
