= Praise This =

- Promotional release poster
- Directed by: Tina Gordon
- Screenplay by: Tina Gordon; Brandon Broussard; Hudson Obayuwana; Jana Savage
- Story by: Brandon Broussard; Hudson Obayuwana; Jana Savage
- Produced by: Will Packer; Tim Story; Sharla Sumpter Bridgett; James Lopez
- Starring: Chloe Bailey; Tristan Mack Wilds; Druski; Birgundi Baker; Anjelika Washington; Quavo
- Cinematography: Sidney Sidell
- Edited by: David Moritz; R.C. Hill
- Music by: Jermaine Stegall
- Production companies: Universal Pictures; Will Packer Productions; The Story Company
- Distributed by: Peacock
- Release date: April 7, 2023
- Running time: 111 minutes
- Country: United States
- Language: English

Praise This is a 2023 American musical comedy romance film directed by Tina Gordon and starring Chloe Bailey and Anjelika Washington.

The rebellious Sam, a young woman with dreams of being a superstar singer-songwriter, joins an underdog Atlanta praise-team choir when sent to live there from LA, hoping to lead them into the national competition.

The film was released on April 7, 2023, by Peacock. It received mixed reviews from critics.

== Plot ==
In Atlanta, a Praise Team known as The Oil Factory bombs at their first attempt at a large competition, as what they have prepared is too conservative. When they try to improvise to recover, they get booed off the stage.

Months later, talented yet rebellious singer Sam is driven by her father Darius to stay with her aunt Liz, uncle Larry and cousin Jess in Atlanta, due to getting in trouble with the law in Los Angeles. Upon arriving, as a psychiatrist Larry has everyone sit to talk about why Darius felt the need to pull her out of LA. He explained she opted to 'take a gap year' to work on music, lying about applying to college. Sam got charged with a misdemeanor when the recording studio where she was recording was raided.

Liz tells Sam she could attend Georgia State in the spring, as she works there and has pulled some strings. After insisting she will not go, Jess shows her their adjoining rooms. The enthusiastic Jess wakes Sam with coffee and an off-key song. Then she loans her a dress, forcing her to go to church.

At the makeshift church, set up in a warehouse, Sam sees their Praise Team. Afterwards, she comments loudly how unimpressed she is with both them and the building. Pastor Googman introduces himself, and insists the group needs to try again. A follower of Atlanta-based rapper Ty, Sam gets Jess to join her in crashing his party. She eventually gets his attention with her voice, just as the police shut down the gathering. Officer Troy, one of Larry's patients, takes Jess and Sam home. Liz and Larry force Sam to join the Oil Factory as punishment as she is caught lying about the party.

Sam improves the team and even helps them get into the regionals, despite Melissa abandoning them for Champion Life without warning. Improvising, Sam sends Jess to play the drums during their performance and they all improvise with spirited dancing and singing.

Doing an impromptu session with Ty, Sam helps with the lyrics to a song he plans to release as a single. However, she complicates things with him when she uses his song without his permission. Ty finds out, as he comes to the competition by surprise. As Sam changes to his song at the last minute, as the group did not have time to rehearse it, they fail to get into the top three. When the team finds out Sam used Ty's song, Jess comes down hard on her. Sam lashes out, declaring she is no longer her sister-cousin, and storms off. Going to a cocktail bar, she soon discovers it is Natalie's. Sam discloses what happened and is told to count her blessings.

Arriving home late, Sam apologizes to Jess, then tries to apologize to Ty in the morning, but he refuses to speak to her. The Oil Factory end up entering the nationals, as one of the top three pulled themselves out due to a sex scandal.

Darius comes in time to see the Oil Factory win the National Finals. Which surprises the host and even the lead singer of Champion Life. Ty has come, so Sam is able to apologize, and he suggests he is interested in future collaborations.

== Cast ==
- Chloe Bailey as Sam, a rebellious aspiring singer-songwriter who joins her cousin's Praise Team when moving to Atlanta
- Anjelika Washington as Jess, Sam's cousin and a member of her church's Praise Team
- Quavo as Ty, a popular rapper In Atlanta and Sam's potential love interest
- Druski as Aaron “Big Love”, Sam's good friend and a member of his church's Praise Team
- Koryn Hawthorne as Fallon, a gospel singer and opposing member of Sam's Praise Team
- Tristan Mack Wilds as P.G.
- Kiara Iman Heffner as Jackie
- Ilario Grant as Jermaine
- Birgundi Baker as Melissa, the leader of the Praise Team
- Loren Lott as Kelly
- Jekalyn Carr as KiKi
- Crystal Renee Hayslett as Natalie
- Cocoa Brown as Cora
- Vanessa Fraction as Prisilla
- Michael Anthony as Bishop Headly
- Kountry Wayne as Painted Duck DJ
- Kendrick Cross as Uncle Larry
- Janora McDuffie as Aunt Liz
- Jayden Braddock as Church Goer (uncredited)

== Production ==
In June 2019, it was announced Tina Gordon would be directing Praise This from an original pitch by Tim Story's The Story Company. In April 2022, Chloe Bailey had signed on to star in the film.

== Release ==
In May 2022, it was announced the film would premiere on Peacock. The first trailer was released on March 6, 2023, revealing the release date of April 7, 2023.

== Reception ==
On review aggregator Rotten Tomatoes, the film holds an approval rating of 50% based on 10 reviews. On Metacritic, the film has a score of 44 out of 100, based on 4 critics, indicating "mixed reviews".

== Awards and nominations ==
| Year | Award | Category | Work | Result | Ref. |
|---|---|---|---|---|---|
| 2023 | Black Reel Awards | Outstanding TV Movie/Limited Series | Derryck Big Tank Thornton | Nominated | |
| 2023 | Black Reel Awards | Outstanding Musical Score | Jermaine Stegall | Nominated | |
| 2023 | Black Reel Awards | Outstanding Production Design | Keith Brian Burns | Nominated | |
| 2023 | Hollywood Music in Media Awards | Best Song - Onscreen Performance (Film) | "Praise Nationals Finale" | Nominated | |
| 2023 | UB Honors | Best Actress | Chloe Bailey | Won | |
| 2024 | Guild of Music Supervisors Awards | Best Music Supervision for a Non-Theatrically Released Film | Derryck Big Tank Thornton | Nominated | |
| 2024 | NAACP Image Awards | Outstanding Actress in a Television Movie, Mini-Series or Dramatic Special | Chloe Bailey | Won | |
| 2024 | NAACP Image Awards | Outstanding Writing in a Television Movie or Special | Tina Gordon, Brandon Broussard, Hudson Obayuwana, Jana Savage, Camilla Blackett | Nominated | |
