= Emily Ting =

American director

- Born: 1980 (age 45–46); Taipei, Taiwan
- Education: New York University
- Occupations: Director, producer, screenwriter
- Years active: 2001–present

Emily Ting is an American director, producer and screenwriter. She was born in Taipei, but later moved to Los Angeles with her family. Ting graduated from the film/TV program at NYU’s Tisch School of the Arts. Her first feature-length film, Already Tomorrow in Hong Kong, was released in 2015.

== Early life and education ==
Ting was born in Taipei in 1980, and moved to Los Angeles with her family when she was very young. After graduating from New York University Tisch School of the Arts, she worked in New York for several years. In 2007, she returned to Hong Kong in order to run her family business.

== Career ==
After graduation, Ting worked at the documentary distribution company Docurama in New York for several years, and later founded her own production company, Unbound Feet Productions. At the beginning of her career, she focused on making documentaries. Her first feature-length documentary, What’s Love Got to Do with It?, premiered in 2002. She also made a documentary short entitled Reality Check in 2006, which is about college graduates facing unemployment.

When Ting ran her family's business in Hong Kong, she made a documentary about her family business, Family Inc, which was released in 2008. It is a personal documentary, following how she gave up her filmmaking dream and returned home to help her father run a big toy manufacturing empire.

Already Tomorrow in Hong Kong (2015), Ting's first scripted feature, received primarily good reviews and was shown at the Los Angeles Film Festival, the Edinburgh International Film Festival, and the New York Asian Film Festival. The movie is partially based on Ting's life and inspired by Sofia Coppola’s Lost in Translation. Already Tomorrow in Hong Kong, a romantic drama, follows a Chinese woman from Los Angeles who makes a business trip to Hong Kong and has a romance with an American expat. They visit various parts of the city, from Lan Kwai Fong and Central to Chungking Mansions and Temple Street. Already Tomorrow in Hong Kong has been lauded for capturing Hong Kong’s vibrant nightlife.

Ting's next film, Go Back to China, is about an American heiress who blows through her trust fund, causing her parents to send her to China to work for their toy making business. Ting has stated that this film, like Already Tomorrow in Hong Kong, is also semi-autobiographical.

== Filmography ==
Feature films

Year	Title	Director	Writer	Producer	Notes
2008	Family Inc	Yes	Yes	Yes	Documentary
2012	The Kitchen	No	No	Yes	
2015	Already Tomorrow in Hong Kong	Yes	Yes	Yes	
2019	Go Back to China	Yes	Yes	Yes	
2022	Tall Girl 2	Yes	No	No	
2024	Girl Haunts Boy	Yes	No	No	

Short films

Year	Title	Director	Producer	Writer
2001	The Kitchen	Yes	Yes	Yes
2001	Unbound Feet	Yes	Yes	Yes
2002	What's Love Got To Do With it?	Yes	Yes	No
2004	One Night Stand	Yes	Yes	No
2006	Reality Check	Yes	Yes	No
2012	The Distance Between	Yes	No	No

Other credits

Year	Title	Role	Notes
2006	The Big Bad Swim	Associate producer	
2013	Pit Stop	Associate producer	
2013	The Ladder	Executive producer	Short film
2014	Land Ho!	Co-executive producer	
2014	Man From Reno	Executive producer	
2015	A Year and Change	Co-producer	

== Awards ==
- Man From Reno Best Narrative Film at Los Angeles Film Festival（2014）
- Land Ho! John Cassavetes Awards at Film Independent Spirit Awards （2014）
- The Distance Between Best Short Film at Omaha Film Festival（2012）
