= Jay Gluck =

American archaeologist (1927–2000)

- Born: Jay Fred Gluck; January 11, 1927; Detroit, Michigan, U.S.
- Died: December 19, 2000 (aged 73); Claremont, California, U.S.
- Spouse: Sumi Hiramoto (m. 1955)
- Children: 2
- Relatives: Griffin Gluck (grandson)

Jay Fred Gluck (January 11, 1927 – December 19, 2000) was an American archaeologist and historian of Persian art and a Japanophile.

== Life and career ==
Gluck was born in Detroit, Michigan, the son of Lillian Mary Veronica Friar (Campbell-Phillips) and Harry Fitzer Gluck, a musician. He spent his childhood in New York's East Side and also lived in his mother's home city of Newcastle, England, for a short while. At 17, he joined the US Navy Air Arm. After the war, he attended different universities before graduating in Archaeology and Middle East Studies from UC Berkeley in 1949. He attended the Asia Institute School for Asian Studies, where he completed a two-year MA degree. He described his religion as a "Jew by temper; Buddhist [by] inclination".

Gluck was the first to stage performances, art exhibits related to Japan and Asia and stage conferences for Asian problems such as the nationalization of Iranian oil and the Arab-Israeli conflict.

Gluck was responsible for the republishing of the 19 volumes of The Survey of Persian Art after the original printing plates were destroyed in London in the Second World War.

In 1963, edited and published "Ukiyo: Stories of the "Floating World" of Postwar Japan", translation of then contemporary Japanese short stories, including one otherwise unpublished piece by Yukio Mishima; and 1992 saw the re-publication of the mammoth one volume 1,340-page" Japan Inside Out" guide to Japan, originally published in 1964 in five volumes.

Invited to Iran in 1966 by his former professor and mentor Arthur Upham Pope, Jay moved his family to Shiraz from Japan to take up the post of Acting Director of the Asia Institute of the Pahlavi University. "n independent research center of publication and study." Gluck oversaw the restoration of the Narenjestan, the beautiful compound of the Ghavam ol-Molk Shirazi, where the Asia Institute was to be housed.

In 1970, Gluck returned with his family to Japan, but maintained a residence in Tehran until his departure forced upon him by changes in the Iranian political climate of 1979 and pending threats of revolution.

1996 saw the publication of, Surveyors of Persian Art: A Documentary Biography of Arthur Upham Pope & Phyllis Ackerman edited by Jay Gluck, Noël Siver and Sumi Hiramoto Gluck, the culmination of 30+ years of work in memory of his lifelong mentor and friend.

In 1980, the first Kitano International Festival was held under the stewardship of Jay and his wife Sumi Hiramoto Gluck. The Festival held at the Kitano Jinja (Shrine) became renowned in the local community for bringing together people of all nationalities living in Kobe and for its generous contribution of proceeds to various international charities of the day.

Jay was the first non-Japanese to receive Kobe City's "International" and "Hyogo Prefecture's 'Order of the Crane'" - their highest civilian awards.

Jay Gluck described himself to Contemporary Authors as a "dilettante of the type one laughingly refers to today as an Asian expert." He commuted quarterly between Iran and Japan from 1963–78, and said that he regrets not recording his impressions of the Iranian milieu just prior to the revolution in 1978: "It is a writer's rent for the space and air he takes up to see life more critically and record this, regardless of the immediate cost it threatens to--but usually does not--demand. Failure to do so costs more later and these payments never cease. The Zen adage that he who knows is silent and he who speaks out knows not is now seen to be but a sad commentary, and not the instructions for evidencing wisdom the young accolyte smugly took them for."

== Personal life ==
Gluck died on December 19, 2000, in California as a result of Parkinson's disease. His Japanese-American wife Sumi (Hiramoto) who converted to Judaism, resided in their house in Claremont, California, until her death on November 19, 2005. Their Japanese-born son Cellin Gluck was raised Jewish, who is a film director and producer. Their grandson is actor Griffin Gluck (Cellin Gluck's son).
