= Already Tomorrow in Hong Kong =

2015 American-Hong Kong film by Emily Ting

- Theatrical release poster
- Directed by: Emily Ting
- Written by: Emily Ting
- Produced by: Emily Ting; Dave Boyle; Jamie Chung; Bryan Greenberg; Lawrence S. Dickerson; Sophia Shek
- Starring: Jamie Chung; Bryan Greenberg; Richard Ng
- Cinematography: Josh Silfen
- Edited by: Danielle Wang
- Music by: Timo Chen
- Production companies: Sedgemoore Pictures; Mission Post; Prehistoric Digital; Ramo Law
- Distributed by: Deltamac Co. (Hong Kong); Gravitas Ventures (US)
- Release dates: June 12, 2015 (US); April 14, 2016 (Hong Kong)
- Running time: 78 minutes
- Countries: United States; Hong Kong
- Language: English

Already Tomorrow in Hong Kong is a 2015 romance film written and directed by Emily Ting and starring real-life couple Jamie Chung and Bryan Greenberg. The film premiered at the 2015 Los Angeles Film Festival received a limited theatrical and VOD release in February 2016.

== Plot ==
Outside a bar, Ruby Lin, an American children's toy designer temporarily in Hong Kong, makes plans over her phone to meet her friends at another bar. Overhearing that her phone doesn't have a GPS and she is lost, American expat Josh Rosenberg offers to walk her to her destination. As they walk and talk and find a connection sparking between them, Josh tells Ruby that he works in finance, but longs to be a writer and she encourages him to quit his job to write a novel. Once they reach the location where Ruby is supposed to meet her friends, Ruby offers to stand them up to get a drink with Josh. At the bar he confesses to Ruby that he has a girlfriend and the reason he was outside the bar and overheard Ruby's conversation was because he had left his girlfriend inside doing birthday shots and flirting with other men. Ruby is infuriated and leaves.

A year later, aboard the Star Ferry, Josh spots Ruby and re-introduces himself hoping to apologize to her. He tells her that their conversation affected him profoundly and he has quit his job in finance to work as a writer over the past year. Ruby tells him that she has been living in Hong Kong for the past year due to a promotion that temporarily relocated her there. In the spirit of honesty, Josh tells Ruby he and his girlfriend are still together while Ruby tells Josh she also has a long-distance boyfriend. The two spend the night reconnecting and gradually feel themselves drifting together romantically once more. While slow dancing at a lounge, Josh is spotted by a friend of his girlfriend's and Ruby is upset, feeling that they have been emotionally cheating with one another. Josh and Ruby split a cab to go home, and Ruby admits to Josh that her boyfriend is actually her fiancé and she is leaving Hong Kong within the week. They both admit that they do not want to cheat with each other but have feelings for each other.

The two sit in the cab outside Ruby's apartment trying to decide what to do.

== Cast ==
- Jamie Chung as Ruby Lin
- Bryan Greenberg as Josh Rosenberg
- Richard Ng as Fortune Teller
- Sarah Lian as Monica
- Zach Hines as Josh's Friend
- Linda Trinh as Joyce

== Production ==
Writer-director Emily Ting, an American of Asian descent, based the script on her own experiences as an expat in Hong Kong. Ting was also inspired by Richard Linklater's Before Sunrise.

Ting cast real-life couple Jamie Chung and Bryan Greenberg to play the couple in her movie after working with Greenberg on The Kitchen.

== Reception ==
The film received generally positive reviews. Andrew Barker for Variety called it "a simple valentine to Hong Kong’s expat nightlife".
