= Nobel Son =

- Promotional poster
- Directed by: Randall Miller
- Written by: Randall Miller; Jody Savin
- Produced by: Art Klein; Michael Ravine; Tom Soulanille
- Starring: Alan Rickman; Bryan Greenberg; Shawn Hatosy; Mary Steenburgen; Bill Pullman; Eliza Dushku; Danny DeVito
- Cinematography: Mike Ozier
- Edited by: Randall Miller
- Music by: Paul Oakenfold; Mark Adler
- Distributed by: Freestyle Releasing
- Release dates: April 28, 2007 (Tribeca Film Festival); December 5, 2008 (United States)
- Running time: 110 minutes
- Country: United States
- Language: English
- Box office: $550,782

Nobel Son is a 2007 American black comedy about a dysfunctional family dealing with the kidnapping of their son for ransom following the father's winning of the Nobel Prize in Chemistry. The film features Alan Rickman as the prize-winning professor and Mary Steenburgen as his wife, with Bryan Greenberg as their kidnapped son.

Principal photography for Nobel Son started on October 6, 2005, in Venice Beach, California, and ended on November 17, 2005. The official trailer and website were released on January 12, 2007.

== Plot ==
Eli Michaelson, a self-involved chemistry professor, learns he has been awarded the Nobel Prize. After verbally abusing his wife, son, colleagues, and nominal girlfriend, he heads off to Sweden with his wife Sarah to collect his award. His son Barkley misses the flight.

Barkley has chosen to study not chemistry but anthropology, and this perceived failure triggers constant torrents of abuse from his father. His missing the flight, though, is the apparently innocent result of having been kidnapped by the deranged Thaddeus James, who claims to be Eli's son by the wife of a former colleague. Thaddeus successfully obtains a ransom of $2 million, which he then splits with Barkley who, it appears, has orchestrated the kidnapping to obtain money from his father.

Shortly after Barkley's release, Thaddeus rents a garage apartment from the Michaelsons and begins to charm Eli with his knowledge of chemistry. Barkley undertakes a campaign of psychological terror aimed at Thaddeus and his girlfriend, performance artist City Hall. This ultimately results in the death of Thaddeus and commitment to a mental hospital for City.

Meanwhile, Barkley kidnaps Eli and threatens to expose the scientific fraud that led to Eli receiving a Nobel Prize that he did not deserve. Eli's long-suffering wife, Sarah, demands a divorce while praising her son for his devious behavior.

In the final scenes, Sarah, Barkley, and Sarah's police detective boyfriend, Max Mariner are seen on a tropical beach. Mariner appears to have been in the dark through most of the movie, but has figured out towards the end that he wants to be with Sarah and can live with the theft of $2 million from her scoundrel husband. Eli is seen in his classroom unrepentantly flirting with another student. He has lost his wife, son, and the money, but he still has his Nobel Prize and the professor position.

== Cast ==
- Alan Rickman as Eli Michaelson, a philandering chemistry professor who wins the Nobel Prize in Chemistry.
- Bryan Greenberg as Barkley Michaelson, the down-on-his-luck college student son of Eli Michaelson, who is kidnapped for ransom following his father's winning of the Nobel Prize.
- Shawn Hatosy as Thaddeus James, Barkley's kidnapper with a dark past.
- Mary Steenburgen as Sarah Michaelson, a forensic psychiatrist; wife of Eli and mother of Barkley.
- Bill Pullman as Max Mariner, the police detective investigating Barkley's kidnapping.
- Eliza Dushku as City Hall, a local poet/artist on whom Barkley has a crush.
- Danny DeVito as George Gastner, the Michaelsons' guest house tenant who is learning to control his obsessive-compulsive disorder.
- Lindy Booth as Beth Chapman, a grad student who’s having an affair with Eli

Cameos include Ted Danson and Tracey Walter as university colleagues of Eli Michaelson, and Ernie Hudson as a police detective aiding in the ransom negotiation.

== Release ==
The film premiered at the 2007 Tribeca Film Festival in New York City. That November, Nobel Son was picked up for distribution by Freestyle Releasing, who gave it a limited theatrical release on December 5, 2008. The movie was released on DVD by 20th Century Fox Home Entertainment on June 9, 2009.

== Reception ==
The film was widely panned by critics. Rotten Tomatoes reports that 27% of critics gave positive reviews based on 64 reviews, with an average score of 4.1/10. The site's consensus reads, "Despite the best efforts of a strong cast, Nobel Son is over-plotted and self-consciously odd." Metacritic, based on a normalized rating from 100 top reviews from mainstream critics, gave the film an average score of 28/100, based on 18 critics, indicating "generally unfavorable reviews".

Manohla Dargis, writing for The New York Times, described the film as "an aggressively noisy exercise in style over substance about nasty people doing nasty things to one another." Roger Ebert gave the film three out of four stars, praising the cast and writing, "The plot is ingenious, the schemes are diabolical, and it is not every day that a character needs to inform us, 'It is more cruel to eat the living than the dead'". Ain't It Cool News called the film "entertaining".
