= The Normals (film) =

- Film poster
- Directed by: Kevin Patrick Connors
- Screenplay by: Christopher Ciancimino
- Based on: The Normals by David Gilbert
- Produced by: Christopher Ciancimino; Kevin Patrick Connors; Jason Orans
- Starring: Bryan Greenberg
- Cinematography: Andre Lascaris
- Edited by: Todd Holmes
- Production companies: Woodshed Entertainment; Gigantic Pictures
- Release date: November 16, 2012
- Running time: 100 minutes
- Country: United States
- Language: English

The Normals is a 2012 American comedy film starring Bryan Greenberg. It is based on the novel of the same name by David Gilbert.

== Cast ==
- Bryan Greenberg as Billy Schine
- Jess Weixler as Gretchen
- Fred Weller as Lannigan
- Josh Pais as Dr. Honeysack
- Reg E. Cathey as Rodney
- John Sayles as Dr. Marx
- Brooke Bloom as Nurse Longley
- Brad Calcaterra as Stew
- Kelli Crump as Joy
- Matt McCarthy as Ossap
- Tim O’Halloran as Dullick
- Debargo Sanyal as Sameer
- Jon Norman Schneider as Do
- Dan Hedaya as Ragnar
- Mishka Balilty as Yellow Patient
- Peter Mark Bockman as Orderly
- Gerard Cordero as Orderly
