= Anjelika Washington =

American actress

- Born: May 15, 1998 (age 28); Bakersfield, California, U.S.
- Occupation: Actress
- Years active: 2014–present

Anjelika Washington (born May 15, 1998) is an American actress known for her work as Fareeda in the Netflix movie Tall Girl and Beth Chapel / Doctor Mid-Nite in the DC Universe series Stargirl.

== Early life ==
Washington was born and raised in Bakersfield, California.

== Career ==
Washington received considerable acclaim for her role as Fareeda in the Netflix movie Tall Girl. Washington also appeared as Gloria in the ATTN online show Girls Room.

== Filmography ==
=== Film ===
Year	Title	Role	Notes
2019	Tall Girl	Fareeda	
2021	Moxie	Amaya	
2022	Tall Girl 2	Fareeda	
2022	Love and Gelato	Addie	
2023	Praise This	Jess	

=== Television ===
Year	Title	Role	Notes
2017	Runaways	Gert #2	Episode: "Fifteen" and "Refraction"
2018	Young Sheldon	Libby	Episode: "Dolomite, Apple Slices, and a Mystery Woman"
2020	Girls Room	Gloria	Main role
2020–2022	Stargirl	Beth Chapel / Doctor Mid-Nite	Main role
2025	High Potential	Lina	Episode "Eleven Minutes"
