= Cartuna =

American animation studio

- Industry: Animation, Television production, Film production
- Founded: April 27, 2015; 11 years ago
- Founders: James Belfer; Adam Belfer
- Headquarters: Brooklyn, New York, United States
- Number of employees: 6
- Website: Official website

Cartuna is a Brooklyn-based animation production company that has made animated TV shows for Syfy, Comedy Central, and Facebook Watch. The company has producers, all of which have their own unique style.

== History ==
The company was founded in May 2015 in Bushwick, Brooklyn by James Belfer and Adam Belfer, viewing a perceived gap in the market for adult animation for digital and mobile audiences that they could fill. The Studio would produce the animation for the documentary film NUTS! in 2016, which won a Special Jury prize at the Sundance Film Festival. Later, the company would expand into making animated series releasing the web series like Dogs in A Park. In 2018, the company would increase production making the shows Human Kind Of and Liverspots and Astronots for Facebook Watch and Alan & Elle for IFC. In 2019, the company would release its first feature, titled Film Tux and Fanny. More recently, Cartuna partnered with Syfy to produce shows for its TZGZ block, specifically Science! in 2019 and Magical Girl Friendship Squad in 2020, along with the associated pilot series released the same year, Magical Girl Friendship Squad: Origins. Cartuna would also be responsible for work on Loafy, a series of animated shorts which aired on Comedy Central.

In September 2020, in an interview, Kelsey Stephanides, creator of Magical Girl Friendship Squad, argued that her show would have been "totally different" if another studio produced it. Cartuna worked with over 100 artists on the series. The animation was done on Adobe Animate, the backgrounds done in Adobe Photoshop, and character design done in both. Five years earlier, while in school at New York University, studying Media, Culture and Communications, Stephanides, a fan of the magical girl genre, came up with the idea for the show and was convinced by Belfer, a professor at the same school, (Note: Belfer is currently an adjunct professor at NYU's Tisch School of the Arts, teaching strategies for independent filmmaking to undergraduates in Film & Television.) to pitch it to Cartuna. After that, production on the series began, meant to be a "short-form pitch to networks," and it was pitched around for years until 2019, when SYFY picked it up, wanting to reboot it, polish it more, and have longer episodes, leading to the creation of the main show, Magical Girl Friendship Squad, itself.

Also in September 2020, Cartuna picked a new Senior-Vice President named Mike Flavin, who formerly worked at Gunpowder & Sky, an independent studio owned by WarnerMedia. Belfer was quoted as saying that they were "doubling down" on development, adding that animation is a medium, rather than a genre, and noted Flavin's experience "from live-action development," allowing them to expand adult animation in the future.

In November 2020 it was announced that Cartuna would be collaborating with Doing Things Media on a IGTV series titled Office Fire.

In 2024, Cartuna launched a Blu-ray distribution label focused on animation, puppetry, DIY art, and alt-comedy. Films titles released are NUTS!, Adam Green's Aladdin and Hundreds of Beavers.

In 2025, Cartuna made their first all-rights acquisition with the title Dead Lover. They had also acquired the upcoming anime film Tamala 2030: A Punk Cat in Dark with Deaf Crocodile.

== Films ==
Year	Film	Distributor	Director(s)	Festivals	Accolades
2016	NUTS!	Amazon Studios	Penny Lane	2016 Sundance Film Festival (premiere), Annecy International Animated Film Festival, Ottawa International Animation Festival, International Film Festival Rotterdam	2016 Sundance Film Festival Special Jury Prize
2016	Just Add Water: The Story of the Amazing Live Sea-Monkeys (short)	CNN, Great Big Story	Penny Lane		
2019	Tux and Fanny		Albert Birney	2019 Ottawa International Animation Festival (premiere)	The New Yorker Best Movies of 2019
2019	Under Covers (short)		Michaela Olsen	2019 Sundance Film Festival (premiere), Ottawa International Animation Festival, AFI Film Festival	
2019	Nellie Bly Makes the News (short)	Reveal News	Penny Lane		
2020	Blackheads		Emily Ann Hoffman	2020 South by Southwest	
2021	Strawberry Mansion	Music Box Films	Albert Birney, Kentucker Audley	2021 Sundance Film Festival (premiere)	
2022	Eyeballs in the Darkness		Albert Birney		
2024	AJ Goes to the Dog Park	Doppelganger Releasing	Toby Jones	2024 Fargo Film Festival (premiere)	
2024	Boys Go to Jupiter	Cartuna, Irony Point	Julian Glander	2024 Tribeca Festival (premiere)	
2025	OBEX	Oscilloscope Laboratories	Albert Birney	2025 Sundance Film Festival (premiere)	
2026	Moonfish		Daniel Zvereff	83rd Venice Film Festival (premiere)	
TBD	The Adventures of Drunky		Aaron Augenblick		

== Television ==
Year	Series	Network	Creator(s)	Accolades
2017	Dogs In A Park	Comcast Watchable, IFC	Daniel Shepard; Keith Shepard	
2018	Human Kind Of	Facebook Watch	Diana McCorry (Note: McCorry would later work on the pilot series for Magical Girl Friendship Squad, titled Magical Girl Friendship Squad: Origins.)	Annie Award for Best Animated Television Production, New York Comic Con
2018	Liverspots and Astronots	Facebook Watch	Nate Milton, Rob Bohn	New York Comic Con
2018	Tammy's Tiny Tea Time		Peter Gulsvig	2018 Sundance Film Festival (premiere)
2018	Alan & Elle	IFC		
2018	Museum of Human History	Topic Studios	Daniel Shepard	
2019	How 8chan Became The Worst Place on The Internet	HBO, Vice News Tonight	Elle Reeve	
2019	Science!	Syfy	Neal Holman	
2020	Magical Girl Friendship Squad: Origins	Syfy	Kelsey Stephanides	
2020	Magical Girl Friendship Squad	Syfy	Kelsey Stephanides	
2020	Desus & Mero	Showtime	Desus Nice, The Kid Mero	
2020	Loafy	Comedy Central	Bobby Moynihan	
2020	The Tonight Show Starring Jimmy Fallon	NBC		
2020	Office Fire	IGTV	Doing Things Media	
2021	Office Ladies Animated Series	Comedy Central	Jenna Fischer, Angela Kinsey	
2021	Ziwe	Showtime	Ziwe Fumudoh	
2021	Winner Winner Dinner Dinner	Snap Originals	Freeman Freeman	
2026	Pop Culture Jeopardy! (Season 2 Opening Titles)	Netflix	Merv Griffin	

== Music videos ==
Year	Artists	Song	Label
2016	Mustard, Nicki Minaj, Jeremih	Don't Hurt Me	Roc Nation
2020	Rotimi, Wale	In My Bed	EMPIRE
2020	Preme, Popcaan, Davido	Comfortable	EMPIRE
2024	Will Smith, Joyner Lucas	TANTRUM	
