= James Belfer =

American film producer

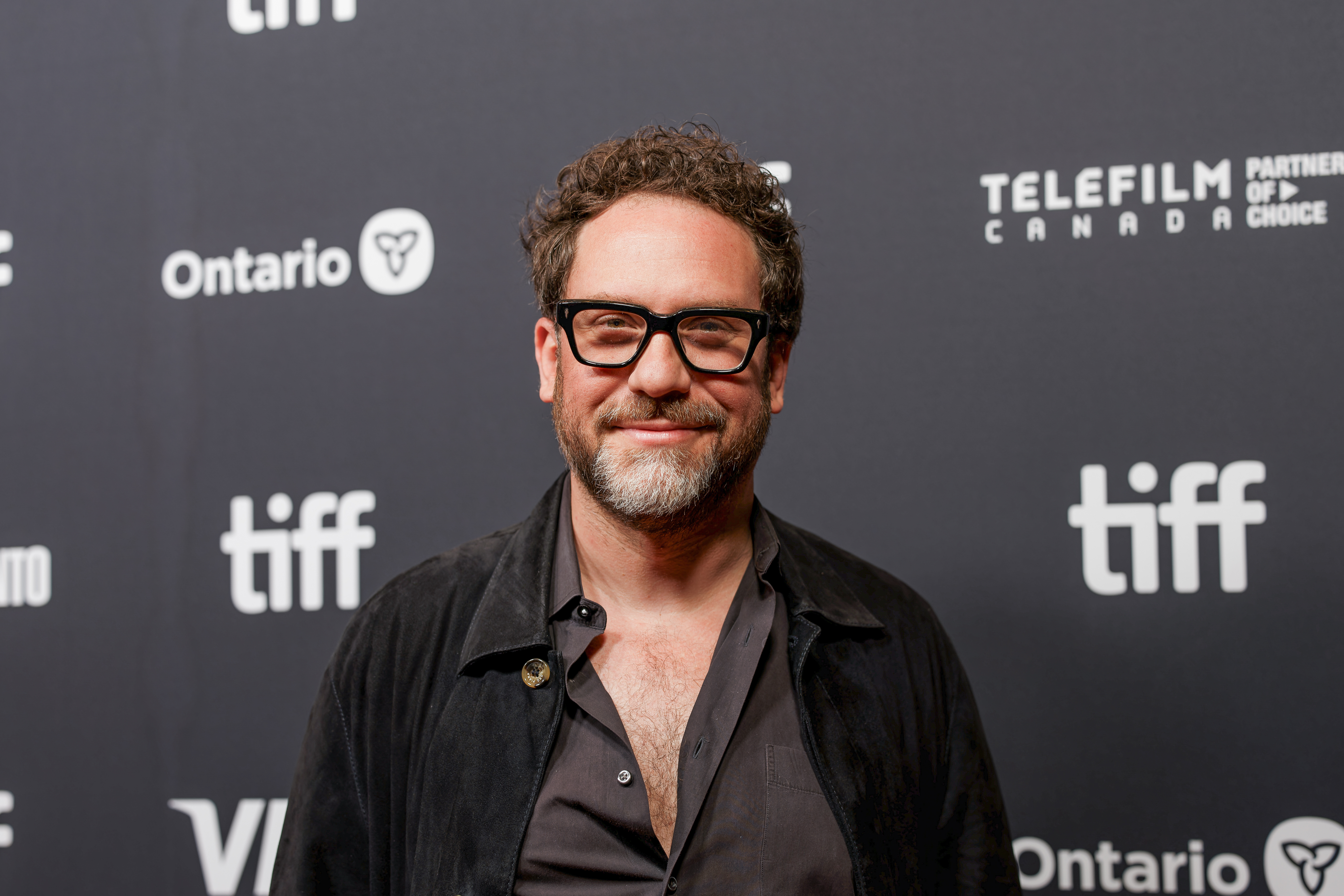
- Born: January 14, 1987 (age 39); United States
- Occupations: Television producer, Film producer
- Years active: 2009—present

James Belfer is an American independent film and TV producer. He is the founder and CEO of Cartuna, the founder and CEO of Dogfish Pictures, and the founder and managing director of Dogfish Accelerator.

== Early life ==
Belfer grew up on Long Island, New York. He received his bachelor's degree from Northwestern University in 2009. That same year, Belfer founded Dogfish Pictures with co-founder Michelle Soffen to finance and produce several feature films per year.

He attended NYU Stern in 2011 to receive his MBA in Entrepreneurship and Innovation, Digital Marketing, and Business Analytics. He was also an Associate for the 2012 Boulder Class of TechStars and an investor in the MESA+ venture fund. In 2012, he created Dogfish Accelerator, the first accelerator program for independent film producers.

== Film career ==
Belfer has produced and financed several films, including The Romantics (co-producer), Salvation Boulevard (co-producer), Like Crazy (associate producer), Vamps (co-executive producer), Compliance (executive producer), and Prince Avalanche (producer). He is currently an adjunct professor at NYU's Tisch School of the Arts, teaching strategies for independent filmmaking to undergraduates in Film & Television. In 2015 Belfer alongside Adam Belfer founded the animation studio Cartuna.

In 2024, Belfer began distributing films under the Cartuna brand. He launched a Blu-ray distribution label focused on animation, puppetry, DIY art, and alt-comedy. Films titles released are NUTS!, Adam Green's Aladdin and Hundreds of Beavers. In 2025, he made his first all-rights acquisition with the title Dead Lover.

=== Filmography ===
Year	Title		Director	Notes	Accolates
2010	The Romantics	Paramount Vantage	Galt Niederhoffer	co-producer	2010 Sundance Film Festival (premiere)
2011	Salvation Boulevard	IFC	George Ratliff	co-producer	2011 Sundance Film Festival (premiere)
2011	Like Crazy	Paramount Pictures	Drake Doremus	associate producer	2011 Sundance Film Festival Grand Jury Prize (premiere)
2012	Vamps	Anchor Bay	Amy Heckerling	co-executive producer	
2012	Compliance	Magnolia Pictures	Craig Zobel	executive producer	2012 Sundance Film Festival (premiere)
2013	Prince Avalanche	Magnolia Pictures	David Gordon Green	producer	2013 Sundance Film Festival (premiere), 63rd Berlin International Film Festival Silver Bear for Best Director
2016	NUTS!	Amazon Studios	Penny Lane	producer	2016 Sundance Film Festival Special Jury Prize (premiere)
2016	Diverge	Gravitas	James Morrison	producer	
2017	Like Me	Kino Lorber	Robert Mockler	producer	2017 SXSW Film Festival (premiere)
2017	Sylvio	Factory 25	Albert Birney and Kentucker Audley	executive producer	2017 SXSW Film Festival (premiere)
2017	Dogs In A Park	Comedy Central, Watchable, IFC	Daniel Shepard and Keith Shepard	executive producer	
2018	Human Kind Of	Facebook Watch	Diana McCorry	executive producer	Annie Award for Best Animated Television Production, New York Comic Con
2018	Liverspots and Astronots	Facebook Watch	Rob Bohn and Nate Milton	executive producer	New York Comic Con
2018	Tammy's Tiny Tea Time		Peter Gulsvig	executive producer	2018 Sundance Film Festival (premiere)
2018	Museum of Human History	Topic Studios	Daniel Shepard	executive producer	
2019	Tux and Fanny		Albert Birney	executive producer	Ottawa International Animation Festival (premiere), The New Yorker Best Movies of 2019
2019	Under Covers		Michaela Olsen	executive producer	2019 Sundance Film Festival (premiere), Ottawa International Animation Festival, AFI Film Festival
2019	Science!	Syfy	Neal Holman	executive producer	
2020	Magical Girl Friendship Squad: Origins	Syfy	Kelsey Stephanides	executive producer	
2020	Magical Girl Friendship Squad	Syfy, Peacock	Kelsey Stephanides	executive producer	San Diego Comic-Con
2020	Desus & Mero	Showtime	Desus Nice, The Kid Mero	animation producer	
2020	Loafy	Comedy Central	Bobby Moynihan	executive animation producer	
2020	Blackheads		Emily Ann Hoffman	executive producer	2020 South by Southwest (premiere)
2021	Strawberry Mansion	Music Box Films	Albert Birney and Kentucker Audley	executive producer	2021 Sundance Film Festival (premiere)
2025	OBEX		Albert Birney	producer	2025 Sundance Film Festival (premiere)
2025	By Design		Amanda Kramer	executive producer	2025 Sundance Film Festival (premiere)
2026	Moonfish		Daniel Zvereff	producer	83rd Venice International Film Festival (premiere)

== Festivals ==
Belfer's films have participated in the Sundance Film Festival, Toronto International Film Festival, Berlin International Film Festival, South by Southwest, Locarno International Film Festival, BAMcinemaFest, Seattle International Film Festival, San Francisco International Film Festival, and Stockholm International Film Festival. In 2011, Belfer's film Like Crazy won the Grand Jury Prize: Dramatic at the Sundance Film Festival. In 2013, Belfer's film Prince Avalanche premiered at the Sundance Film Festival and won the 2013 Berlinale Silver Bear Award for Best Director.

== Honors ==
In 2012, Belfer was named "Ten Producers To Keep Watching" by Deadline Hollywood.

== Personal life ==
He currently resides in New York City.
