= The Beast Pageant =

2011 film

- Theatrical release poster
- Directed by: Albert Birney; Jon Moses
- Written by: Albert Birney; Jon Moses
- Starring: Jon Moses; Ted Greenway; Emily Osinski; S. Michael Smith; Sam Hughes; Jon Eaton
- Edited by: Maurice Dowdry
- Music by: The Beast Pageant Orchestra
- Animation by: Phil Davis
- Production company: Jubadaba Productions
- Release date: September 26, 2010
- Running time: 74 minutes
- Budget: $10,000

The Beast Pageant is a 2010 American surrealist fantasy film directed by Albert Birney and Jon Moses. It was co-written, edited, and shot by the duo, with music composed by The Beast Pageant Orchestra. Known for its lo-fi 16 mm cinematography, absurdist imagery, and satirical narrative, the film follows a man named Abraham who escapes a mechanized life of consumer conformity and embarks on a symbolic journey of self-discovery through a strange and mythic wilderness. The film premiered at the Dryden Theatre in Rochester, New York, and went on to screen at numerous underground and independent film festivals including Slamdance, Maryland Film Festival, and the San Francisco Independent Film Festival.

Notable for its handmade production style, practical effects, and themes critiquing modern technology and media culture, The Beast Pageant is described as a modern fairy tale told through experimental techniques reminiscent of David Lynch, Jan Švankmajer, and Michel Gondry.

Though not widely distributed, the film garnered a cult following and was an early example of Birney's signature artistic approach, later seen in his work on Sylvio and Strawberry Mansion.

== Plot ==
Abraham, a worker in a stark industrial landscape, lives under the sway of a bizarre machine that both serves and controls him. Inside it lurk a man and a woman who cater to his every need. His monotonous life is upended when Zeke, a miniature singing cowboy, emerges from within Abraham’s body, urging him toward a surreal wilderness adventure. He encounters whimsical and disturbing figures: a seed‑spitting “Watermelon Man,” dancing pine‑tree people, and a horned beast.

== Cast ==
- John Moses as Abraham
- Ted Greenway as Machine Man
- Emily Osinski as Machine Woman
- S. Michael Smith as Watermelon Man
- Sam Hughes as Beast King
- Daan Zwick as Factory Man
- Brad Ward as Egg Man
- Steve Shanker as Coughing Man
- Rocco Hagen as Waiting Man
- Janice Dowd as Receptionist
- Dinah Holtzman as Nurse
- Vanessa Lauria as Nurse
- Nancy Ensman as Nurse
- Natalie Welsh as Doctor
- Darryl G. Jones as Lantern Man
- Tigran Vardanyan as Man in Hat
- Amanda Wallace as Dualbrush Woman
- Katherine Stathis as Soda & Pop Woman
- Melissa Jackson as Razor Woman
- Jason Olshefsky as Waltzing Man
- Ali Fernaays as Waltzing Woman
- Marjorie Goldman as Motel Woman
- Erin Wingerden as Tree
- Danielle Wingerden as Tree
- Emily Osinski as Tree
- Holly Foster as Tree
- Samantha Bennettlepel as Rock
- Katherine Stathis as Rock
- Jon Eaton as Artichoke Man
- Ron Bauerle as Milkmother
- Melissa Saffer as Woman
- Jeffrey Stanin as Man
- Chelsea Bonagura as Machine Woman Voice
- Elanor Galen James as Additional Voices
- Vanessa Lauria as Additional Voices
- Charlie Rance as Additional Voices
- K.A. Westphal as Additional Voices

== Production ==
The Beast Pageant was independently produced by co-directors Albert Birney and Jon Moses over the course of several years using a highly DIY approach. The film was shot primarily on black-and-white 16 mm film using a spring-wound Bolex camera, a deliberate choice that reinforced its analog aesthetic and hand-crafted tone.

The filmmakers employed a minimalist and resourceful production style, constructing elaborate sets and costumes from found materials, discarded objects, and handmade props. Much of the film’s surreal visual language—such as the mechanical "Man Machine" and the papier-mâché creatures—was fabricated by the directors themselves or with help from friends and collaborators in their Rochester, New York Community.

To fund post-production, Birney and Moses launched a successful Kickstarter campaign in 2010, raising over $8,000 from nearly 150 backers.

== Release ==
The Beast Pageant premiered on September 26, 2010 at the Dryden Theatre at George Eastman House in Rochester, New York. The premiere attracted a large local audience and featured a Q&A with the filmmakers. The film subsequently screened at a range of underground and independent film festivals throughout 2011, including Slamdance, the San Francisco Independent Film Festival, the Maryland Film Festival, Boston Underground Film Festival, and Lund Fantastic Film Festival, among others.

Following its festival run, The Beast Pageant was released on DVD and as a digital download directly through the filmmakers’ website and at select screenings. The DVD release featured bonus content, including deleted scenes, behind-the-scenes footage, and an original short film by the directors. Though it did not receive a wide theatrical release or traditional distribution deal, the film found a cult audience through word of mouth, festival screenings, and its handcrafted aesthetic.

== Soundtrack ==
The original score for The Beast Pageant was composed and performed by The Beast Pageant Orchestra, a group assembled specifically for the film. The soundtrack blends acoustic instrumentation, ambient textures, and folk-inspired melodies to complement the film’s surreal and dreamlike tone. The music plays a central role in the storytelling, often replacing dialogue and enhancing the film’s atmosphere of quiet absurdity and emotional transformation. The Beat Pageant Orchestra is made up of Albert Birney, Margaret Coote, Phil Davis, Jon Eaton, Jeff Hobson, Joe Hobson, Sam Hughes, Thomas Hughes, Nick Krill, Dan Lane, Jon Moses, Emily Osinski, Jeffrey Stanin, and Tigran Vardanyan

The soundtrack was recorded by Nick Krill, known for his work with The Spinto Band and other indie projects, bringing a warm, analog sensibility to the film’s aural landscape. The score features recurring themes and character motifs, including musical cues for Zeke, the miniature cowboy who emerges from Abraham’s body, and for the “Man Machine” that dominates Abraham’s mechanical life.

Though not widely available currently as a standalone album, selections from the score were included as bonus content on the Beast Pageant DVD and were distributed to backers of the film’s Kickstarter campaign.
