= Albert Birney =

American filmmaker

- Born: March 2, 1982 (age 44); Wilmington, Delaware, U.S.
- Occupations: Filmmaker, animator, writer
- Years active: 2000s–present
- Known for: Strawberry Mansion, Sylvio, Tux and Fanny

Albert Birney (born March 2, 1982) is an American filmmaker, writer, and animator best known for his visually imaginative and surreal films, including Strawberry Mansion (2021) and Sylvio (2017). His work blends hand-drawn animation, absurdist humor, and dreamlike storytelling. Birney is also known for co-creating the indie video game and animated project Tux and Fanny.

== Early life and education ==
Albert Birney was born in Wilmington, Delaware. He became interested in music and visual storytelling at a young age, co-founding the indie pop group The Spinto Band while still in high school. He later attended Syracuse University, where he earned a B.A. in Film in 2004.

== Career ==
=== Early work and music ===
Birney was one of the founding members of The Spinto Band, an indie rock group formed in the late 1990s. He left the band in the early 2000s to pursue filmmaking and visual arts full-time. He is also a founding member of Teen Men, Hotel Alien and releases music under his own name. Birney's early work directing music videos for these projects served as a segue into his narrative and experimental film career. He has directed music videos for bands such as Ra Ra Riot, Dr. Dog, Generationals, Future Islands and Dan Deacon.

=== Filmmaking ===
Birney's breakout feature film was Sylvio (2017), which he co-directed with Kentucker Audley. The film premiered at the SXSW Film Festival and was named one of the best films of the year by The New Yorker.

In 2021, Birney and Audley co-directed Strawberry Mansion, a science fiction romantic fantasy that premiered at the Sundance Film Festival. The film received critical acclaim for its imaginative visuals and analog aesthetic.

Birney is the creator of the animated project and video game Tux and Fanny, which features hand-drawn pixel art and surreal humor. The project received widespread praise for its originality and philosophical undertones.

In 2025, Birney released his sixth feature film, OBEX, continuing his exploration of analog and DIY filmmaking techniques.

== Personal life ==
Birney is the nephew of actor Reed Birney, who starred in Strawberry Mansion. He lives and works in Baltimore, Maryland.

== Filmography ==
=== Feature films ===
| Year | Title | Role(s) | Notes |
|---|---|---|---|
| 2010 | The Beast Pageant | Co‑director, writer | Early feature co-directed with Jon Moses (portfolio notes) |
| 2017 | Sylvio | Co‑director, co-writer, actor (in gorilla suit) | Premiered at indie festivals like Maryland / SXSW; named one of the ten best films of 2017 by The New Yorker |
| 2019 | Tux and Fanny | Director, writer | |
| 2021 | Strawberry Mansion | Co-director, co-writer | Premiered at Sundance 2021; critically acclaimed; stars include Reed Birney |
| 2022 | Eyeballs in the Darkness | Director, writer | |
| 2025 | OBEX | Director, writer | World premiere at Sundance 2025 on Jan 25; Oscilloscope acquired distribution |

=== Music Videos ===
- "Brown Boxes" – The Spinto Band (2007)
- "Mountains" – The Spinto Band (2007)
- "Direct to Helmet" – The Spinto Band (2007)
- "Dying is Fine" – Ra Ra Riot (2007)
- "Alaska" – Dr. Dog (2007)
- "The Coolest Kid in School" – The Teeth (2007)
- "You Can Stay There" – Capitol Years (2007)
- "The Waterline" – Pepi Ginsberg (2008)
- "Japan is an Island" – The Spinto Band (2008)
- "Summer Grof" – The Spinto Band (2008)
- "Pumpkins & Paisley" – The Spinto Band (2008)
- "I Can Hear The Trains Coming" – Mathieu Santos (2010)
- "Ten-Twenty-Ten" – Generationals (2011)
- "Are You A Real Person?" – Jonathan Mann (2011)
- "The Left Hand and the Right Hand" – Chuck Prophet (2012)
- "Muesli" – The Spinto Band (2012)
- "Endless Town" – Sweet Lights (2012)
- "What I Love" – The Spinto Band (2012)
- "S'Alive to Be Known" – The Music Tapes (2012)
- "Hiding Records" – Teen Men (2013)
- "The Sea, The Sea" – Teen Men (2015)
- "Kids Being Kids" – Teen Men (2015)
- "Trillium" – Peals (2017)
- "Ran" – Future Islands (2017)
- "Strawberry Mansion Theme" – Dan Deacon (2022)
- "Deep in the Night" – Future Islands (2023)

=== Short films and other projects ===
| Year | Title | Role(s) | Notes |
|---|---|---|---|
| 1993 | Home, Forever and Ever | Director, Animator | |
| 2002 | Hickory | Director, Animator | Featuring Nicholas Gurewitch and Sarah Witt |
| 2004 | Cactus | Director | Co-written by Vanessa Lauria |
| 2010 | 22 Action News | Director, Actor | |
| 2017 | Bone Gym | Director, Animator | Music by Thomas Hughes and Gretchen Lohse |
| 2018 | Keep Up the Good Wor | Director | Made for the New Works screening at the Red Room on February 16, 2018 |
| 2018 | The Night Fish | Director | |
| 2018 | It Feels Like Forever | Director, Animator | Produced by Marnie Ellen Hertzler. Featured in the 2018 Maryland Film Festival. |
| 2021 | We're All Going To The World's Fair | Animator | Contributing animator of video game sequence |
| 2023 | Buzzer | Director | Music by Jimmy Joe Roche and Alexander Borodin |
| 2023 | 22 Rooms | Director | Featuring furniture from American Antique Furniture vol. 1 by Edgar G. Miller, Jr. |
| 2024 | Gruenfeld | Director | |
| 2024 | I Saw the TV Glow | Actor, Animator | Includes an excerpt of Tux and Fanny |
| 2024 | Melody Electronics | Director | Official Selection of International Film Festival Rotterdam 2025 |
| 2025 | Tank Fantasy | Director | |
