= Bip Ling =

English model, influencer, musician, fashion illustrator, and visual artist

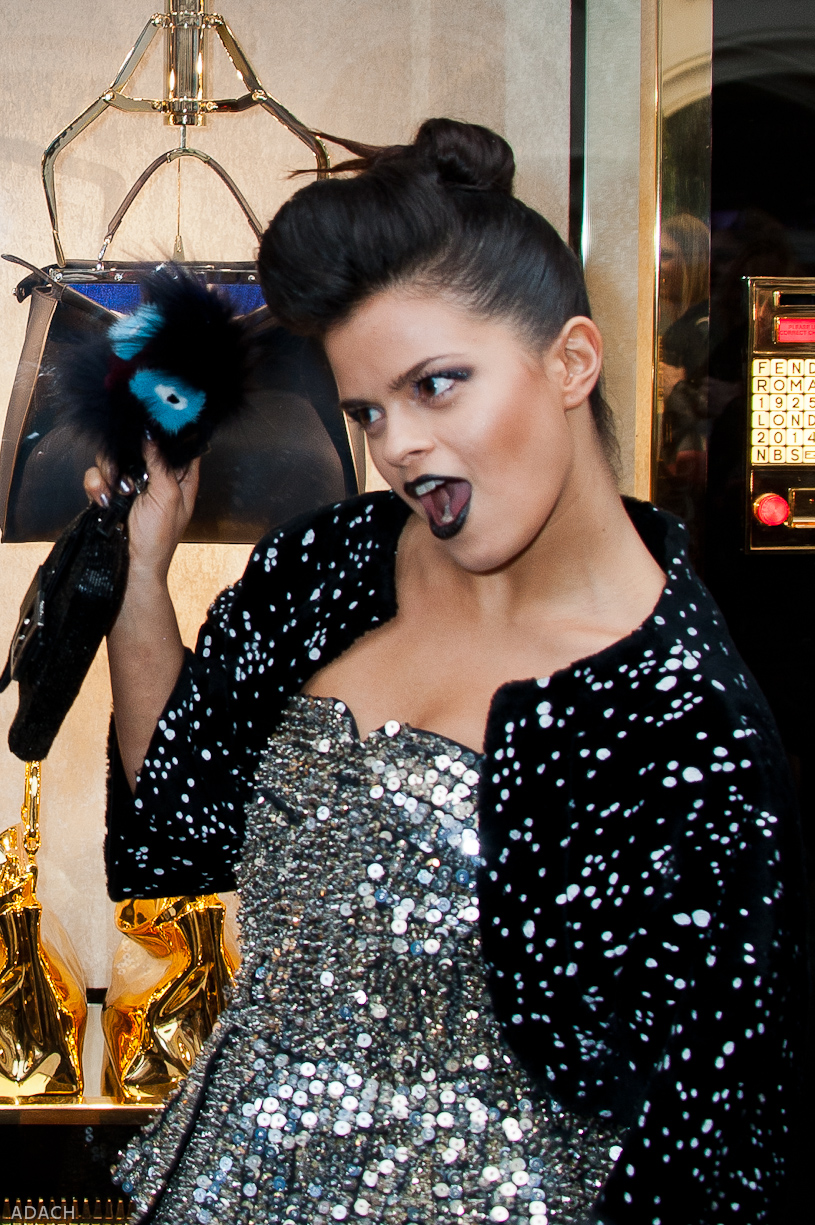
- Ling at an event in 2017
- Born: Bipasha Elizabeth Ling; 23 June 1989 (age 37); Southwark, London, England
- Education: Central Saint Martins
- Occupations: Model; influencer; visual artist; musician; fashion illustrator
- Years active: 2009–present
- Parents: Tanya Ling; William Ling
- Musical career
- Genres: Pop; electronic
- Instrument: Vocals
- Website: bipashaelizabethling.blogspot.com

Bipasha Elizabeth Ling, known professionally as Bip Ling (stylised in all caps) is an English model, influencer, visual artist, musician, and fashion illustrator. She has modeled in various publications, including British Vogue, Vogue, Nylon, and Love, and has worked as a presenter for Vogue.com. Ling has modeled for fashion brands such as Forever 21, Nike, and Calvin Klein, and has produced fashion illustrations for Topshop. She is known for her blog, Bipling.com, and her mascot, Mooch, a cartoon bear.

== Life and career ==
Ling's mother, Tanya Ling, is a fashion illustrator. Her father, William Ling, owns the Fashion Illustration Gallery. Ling has two siblings.

Ling studied Fine Art at Central Saint Martins. She launched her own fashion blog, bipashaelizabethling.blogspot.com, in 2009. She was signed to modelling agency Storm Management at age 21.

Ling first started DJing at age 17. She released her first album, Church of Bop, in 2018.

Ling played Princess Barbara in the 2016 film Adam Green's Aladdin.

== Discography ==
- Church of Bop (2018)
- Bip UP the NHS, Yar! (2020)
- Jokez (2020)
- Mooch Albumbag (2025)
- Bip Bop Flip Fone (2026)
