= Human Kind Of =

- Genre: Adult animation; Comedy
- Created by: Diana McCorry
- Voices of: Michelle Trachtenberg; Kate Berlant; Jill Talley; Zak Orth
- Composers: Cody McCorry; Karmic Juggernaut
- Country of origin: United States
- Original language: English
- No. of seasons: 1
- No. of episodes: 21

Production
- Executive producers: Diana McCorry; Daniel Shepard; James Belfer; Adam Belfer
- Editors: Noelle Melody; Mike Parker
- Running time: 4–10 minutes
- Production company: Cartuna

Original release
- Network: Facebook Watch
- Release: September 16 – October 28, 2018

Human Kind Of is an American adult animated comedy web series created by Diana McCorry that premiered on September 16, 2018, on Facebook Watch. It was Facebook Watch's first original animated series.

== Premise ==
Human Kind Of begins when "Judy Reilly, a nerdy teenager, finds out her estranged father was an extraterrestrial" and realizes "surviving a half-alien adolescence seems pretty hopeless. But with the help of a dangerously upbeat mother and a comic book obsessed best friend, Judy is able to uncover her powers, stand up to bullies, and inevitably discover what makes her both alien and human along the way."

== Cast and characters ==
=== Main ===
- Michelle Trachtenberg as Judy Reilly
- Kate Berlant as Cory
- Jill Talley as Iris
- Zak Orth as Mr. Russo / Ethan / Dad / Eye Patch

=== Recurring ===
- Jeremy Bent as The Man
- Jamie Loftus as Melissa
- Diana McCorry as GPS
- John Early as Callie / Mr. Jake
- Betsy Sodaro as Ms. Coward / Hungry Alien

== Episodes ==
No.	Title	Directed by	Written by	Original release date
1	"Attack of the Period Monster"	Joy Buran & Noelle Melody	Diana McCorry & Daniel Shepard	September 16, 2018
2	"Gene Genie"	Joy Buran & Noelle Melody	Diana McCorry & Daniel Shepard	September 16, 2018
3	"Volleyball Goddess"	Joy Buran & Noelle Melody	Jamie Loftus	September 16, 2018
4	"Judy and the Beast"	Joy Buran & Noelle Melody	Diana McCorry & Daniel Shepard	September 23, 2018
5	"Mating Habits"	Joy Buran & Noelle Melody	Diana McCorry & Daniel Shepard	September 23, 2018
6	"Uncommon Cold"	Joy Buran & Noelle Melody	Diana McCorry & Daniel Shepard	September 23, 2018
7	"Interior: Bully"	Joy Buran & Noelle Melody	Jamie Loftus	September 30, 2018
8	"Desperately Seeking Social Skills"	Joy Buran & Noelle Melody	Moujan Zolfaghari	September 30, 2018
9	"The Core"	Joy Buran & Noelle Melody	Jamie Loftus	September 30, 2018
10	"Mr. Russo is Missing"	Joy Buran & Noelle Melody	Moujan Zolfaghari	October 7, 2018
11	"You Can Trust Me, Judy"	Joy Buran & Noelle Melody	Diana McCorry & Daniel Shepard	October 7, 2018
12	"Space Camp"	Joy Buran & Noelle Melody	Diana McCorry	October 7, 2018
13	"Work Is Work"	Joy Buran & Noelle Melody	Diana McCorry	October 14, 2018
14	"Aliens Anonymous"	Joy Buran & Noelle Melody	Diana McCorry	October 14, 2018
15	"Hoax of the Century"	Joy Buran & Noelle Melody	Diana McCorry	October 14, 2018
16	"House Party"	Joy Buran & Noelle Melody	Diana McCorry	October 21, 2018
17	"Plan B From Outer Space"	Joy Buran & Noelle Melody	Moujan Zolfaghari	October 21, 2018
18	"Invisible Girl"	Joy Buran & Noelle Melody	Moujan Zolfaghari	October 21, 2018
19	"I Bought Your School"	Joy Buran & Noelle Melody	Moujan Zolfaghari	October 28, 2018
20	"Big Fish"	Joy Buran & Noelle Melody	Diana McCorry	October 28, 2018
21	"Small Pond"	Joy Buran & Noelle Melody	Diana McCorry	October 28, 2018

== Production ==
=== Development ===
In September 2018, Facebook Media Productions, LLC filed trademark applications for the show to the United States Patent and Trademark Office. As of August 2020, Facebook Media Productions, LLC still holds the trademark for the series.

On September 14, 2018, it was announced that Facebook Watch had given the production a series order for a first season consisting of twenty-one episodes. Production companies involved with the series were slated to consist of digital media company Cartuna. Joy Buran and Noelle Melody were animation directors on the series.

=== Casting ===
Alongside the initial series announcement, it was confirmed that the series would feature the voices of Michelle Trachtenberg, Kate Berlant, Jill Talley, Zak Orth, John Early, and Betsy Sodaro.

=== Release ===
On September 17, 2018, the series premiered on Facebook Watch on the same day as Liverspots and Astronots and released three episodes each week. The season finale aired on October 28, 2018. No more new episodes were released.

== Reception ==
Encyclopedia of Science Fiction contributor Steven Pearce gave a short positive review of the show, saying that the show uses Judy's condition to "explore teenage social anxieties" at first, but this later changes, praising it for its story which relies on science fiction tropes, and humor, calling it "an interesting and amusing show." Bubble Blabber praised the series for its mature content, including supernatural themes, character designs, and animation, while questioning its episode times and the release schedule, but calling it "kind of brilliant."

=== Awards and nominations ===
Year	Award	Category	Nominee(s)	Result	Ref.
2019	Annie Awards	Best General Audience Animated; Television / Broadcast Production	Human Kind Of (for "Desperately Seeking Social Skills")	Nominated	
