= OBEX =

American film

- Theatrical release poster
- Directed by: Albert Birney
- Written by: Albert Birney; Pete Ohs
- Produced by: James Belfer; Albert Birney; Emma Hannaway; Pete Ohs
- Starring: Albert Birney; Callie Hernandez; Frank Mosley
- Cinematography: Pete Ohs
- Edited by: Albert Birney; Pete Ohs
- Music by: Josh Dibb
- Production companies: Cartuna; True Friend; Spartan Media Acquisitions; Salem Street Entertainment; Ley Line Entertainment
- Distributed by: Oscilloscope
- Release dates: January 25, 2025 (Sundance); January 9, 2026 (United States)
- Running time: 90 minutes
- Country: United States
- Language: English
- Box office: $48,257

OBEX is a 2025 American science fiction film written and directed by Albert Birney. It stars Albert Birney, Callie Hernandez and Frank Mosley.

It premiered at the 2025 Sundance Film Festival on January 25, 2025. It was released on January 9, 2026, by Oscilloscope.

== Plot ==
Conor Marsh lives a secluded life in Baltimore in 1987, with his dog, Sandy. One day, while reading through a computer magazine, he discovers an advertisement for a video game called OBEX, featuring a demon villain named Ixaroth who devours human souls. Interested, he buys the game, and begins to play it, only to be disappointed with the simple game play of it. That night, he is awakened by the sounds of his printer, and reads a note that reads something is inside his VHS tape collection. He searches his tape collection to no avail. Ixaroth emerges from his television set and kidnaps Sandy.

The next morning, Conor learns of Sandy's disappearance, and finds a Macintosh computer outside, where it sucks him into video game world of OBEX. He enters a store where he meets a woman who runs the shop, and she provides him with materials for his journey. En route, he rescues a television head named Victor from cicada-like figures. Victor then decides to accompany him on his journey. During their journey, Conor is attacked by skeletons.

Victor takes a wounded Conor to the store to revive him, before resuming their journey. They reach Ixaroth's castle, which is locked. Unable to enter the castle, they sleep in for the night. The next morning, Conor finds the skeletal remains of Victor, who sacrificed himself to unlock the castle's gates. Conor then proceeds to enter the castle, where he finds himself in a church filled with cicada-like figures, and Sandy, but couldn't free his pet in time.

Ixaroth confronts Conor at the church. Enraged of what Ixaroth did to Sandy, he defeats Ixaroth by killing him with his sword, and soon reconciles with Sandy. It is then revealed that the entire journey was all played in the game, played by Conor, back to his normal life with Sandy now. Conor and Sandy then relax at a beach.

== Cast ==
- Albert Birney as Conor Marsh
- Callie Hernandez as Mary
- Frank Mosley as Victor

== Production ==
In 2020, while Albert Birney was working on a video game adaption of his 2019 animated film, Tux and Fanny, he thought about making a video game that's also a film, before going with a film about a video game after he is unable to imagine what that would look like. The following year, in Baltimore, Birney got a dog named Dorothy to star for him in the film, and acquired two old Macintosh computers from a junk shop. Birney filmed cicadas crawling through his garbage can in his backyard. A year later, Birney brought his friend, Pete Ohs, to help work on the film, with Ohs providing the cinematography and sound design. Another year later, the crew required more actors, costumes, and props. One other person served as a crew member for the second half of the film. Principal photography began in September 2022, taking place in Baltimore, Birney's hometown.

== Release ==
OBEX had its world premiere at the 2025 Sundance Film Festival on January 25, 2025. In February 2025, Oscilloscope acquired distribution rights to the film. It was released on January 9, 2026.

== Reception ==
On the review aggregator website Rotten Tomatoes, 97% of 58 critics' reviews are positive, with an average rating of 7.2/10. The website's consensus reads: "A beguiling odyssey that offsets its scrappy production values with sumptuously analog production, OBEX is a wildly inventive riff on the digital world." Metacritic, which uses a weighted average, assigned the film a score of 75 out of 100, based on 13 critics, indicating "generally favorable" reviews.
