= In My Bed =

In My Bed may refer to:

- In My Bed (Dru Hill song), 1996
- In My Bed (Amy Winehouse song), 2004
- In My Bed (Sabrina Carpenter song), 2019
- In My Bed (Rotimi song), 2019
