= Moonfish (film) =

2026 animated film by Daniel Zvereff

- Directed by: Daniel Zvereff
- Written by: Daniel Zvereff
- Produced by: Mireia Vilanova; Rebecca Ling Wyzan; James Belfer
- Starring: Morgan Spector; Lucy Liu
- Edited by: Daniel Zvereff
- Music by: Sami Jano
- Production companies: La Biennale di Venezia; Opah; Present Company; Cartuna; Lucky Accident Productions
- Release date: September 6, 2026 (Venice)
- Running time: 89 minutes
- Countries: United States; Italy
- Language: English

Moonfish is a 2026 animated drama sci-fi film written, edited, and directed by Daniel Zvereff, in his directorial debut. A co-production of the United States and Italy, it stars Morgan Spector and Lucy Liu.

The film had its world premiere in the Biennale College Cinema section of the 83rd Venice International Film Festival on September 6, 2026.

== Premise ==
An astronaut loses his only companion on a deep space mining mission, while fulfilling a strict quota to return home. As years go by, his grip on realty unravels.

== Cast ==
- Morgan Spector
- Lucy Liu

== Production ==
The film was developed and produced as part of the Biennale College Cinema, being the first animated film to receive a grant. Lucy Liu and Morgan Spector additionally serve as executive producers.

== Release ==
The film had its world premiere in the Biennale College Cinema section of the 83rd Venice International Film Festival on September 6, 2026.
