= Nice and Nicely Done =

Studio album by The Spinto Band
- Released: June 7, 2005
- Genre: Indie rock
- Length: 34:44
- Labels: Bar/None Records (U.S.); Virgin Records (UK)

The Spinto Band chronology
| Mersey & Reno (2001) | Nice and Nicely Done (2005) | Moonwink (2008) |

Nice and Nicely Done is the fifth studio album by The Spinto Band, released on June 7, 2005 in North America, and April 7, 2006 worldwide.

== Track listing ==
| No. | Title | Length |
|---|---|---|
| 1. | "Did I Tell You" | 3:10 |
| 2. | "Brown Boxes" | 2:28 |
| 3. | "Oh Mandy" | 3:35 |
| 4. | "Trust vs. Mistrust" | 2:50 |
| 5. | "Spy vs. Spy" | 3:21 |
| 6. | "Crack the Whip" | 3:02 |
| 7. | "Direct to Helmet" | 3:09 |
| 8. | "Late" | 4:26 |
| 9. | "So Kind, Stacy" | 2:41 |
| 10. | "Mountains" | 2:23 |
| 11. | "Japan Is an Island" (U.S. Bonus Track) | 3:39 |

== Release history ==
Professional ratings
Review scores
| Source | Rating |
|---|---|
| AllMusic | 4/5 stars |
| Pitchfork Media | 7.3/10 stars |

| Country | Release date |
|---|---|
| Canada | June 7, 2005 |
| United States | June 7, 2005 |
| Worldwide | April 7, 2006 |
