= Brian L. Frye =

American filmmaker, artist, and law professor

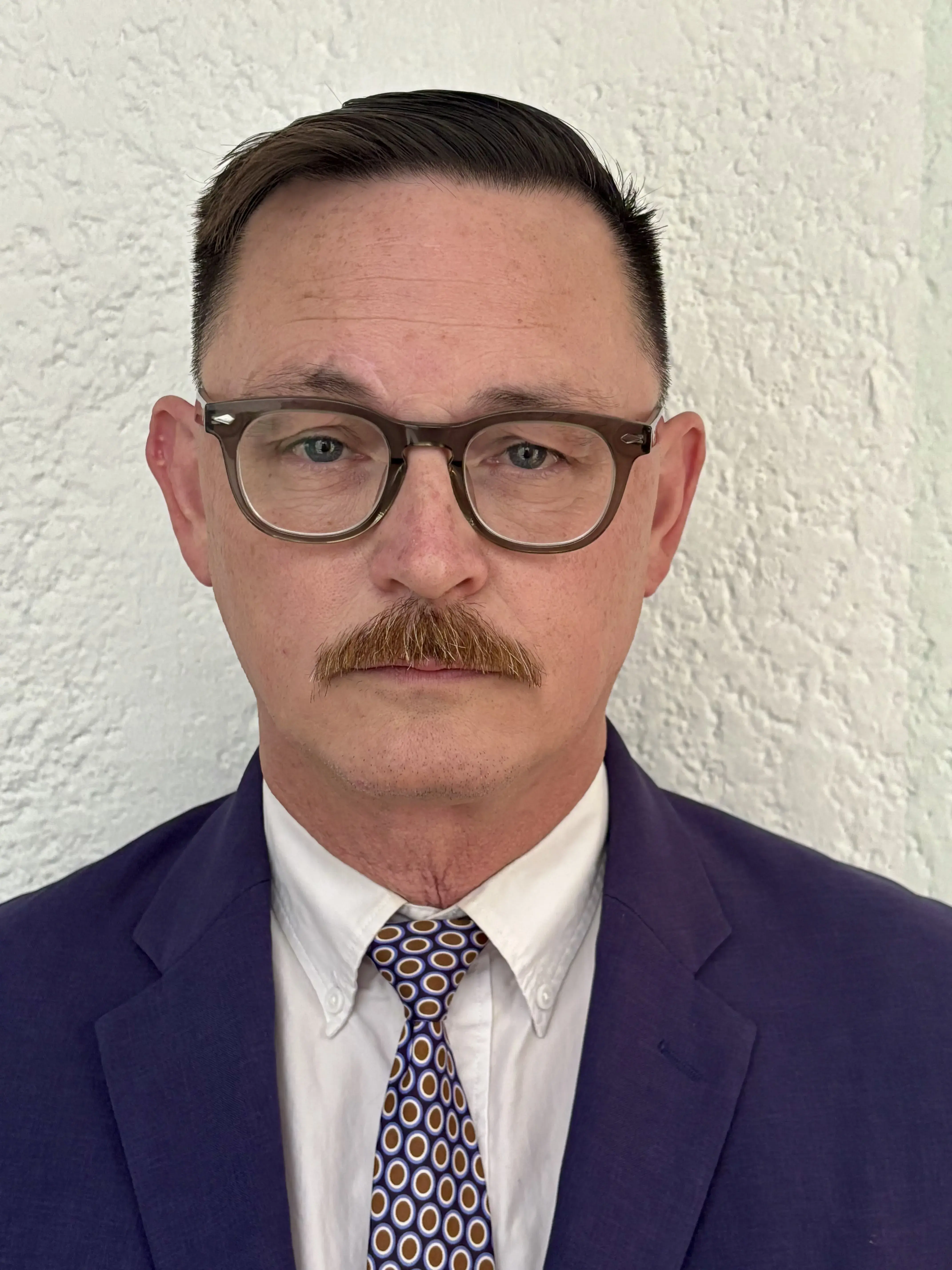
- Frye in 2025
- Born: Brian Lawrence Frye; 1974 (age 51–52); San Francisco, California, U.S.
- Education: University of California, Berkeley (BA); San Francisco Art Institute (MFA); Georgetown University Law Center; New York University School of Law (JD)
- Occupations: Independent filmmaker; artist; law professor
- Spouses: Penny Lane; Maybell Romero (m. 2020)

Brian Lawrence Frye (born 1974) is an American independent filmmaker, artist, and law professor. His work includes Our Nixon, for which he served as a producer with his ex-wife, Penny Lane. His film Oona's Veil is included in the permanent collection of the Whitney Museum of Art, and his writings on film and art have appeared in The New Republic, Film Comment, Cineaste, Millennium Film Journal, and The Village Voice. Filmmaker Magazine listed him as one of the 25 New Faces of Independent Film 2012. He currently is the Spears-Gilbert Associate Professor of Law at the University of Kentucky College of Law, where he teaches courses on civil procedure, intellectual property, copyright, and nonprofit organizations. Frye is currently a visiting professor at Tulane University Law School where his spouse, Maybell Romero, is the McGlinchey Stafford Associate Professor of Law. He is a vocal critic of the bar exams and refers to his course on professional responsibility as "Managing the Legal Cartel".

== Early life and legal career ==
Frye was born in San Francisco, California. He received a BA in Cinema Studies from the University of California at Berkeley in 1994 and an MFA in Filmmaking from the San Francisco Art Institute in 1997. He decided to attend Georgetown Law School in 2002, a decision profiled in The Washington Post, but received his JD from the New York University School of Law in 2005. While working as an independent filmmaker, artist, and critic, he taught as a visiting professor at Hampshire College before attending law school.

After law school, he clerked for Justice Richard B. Sanders of the Washington Supreme Court from 2005 to 2006 and Judge Andrew J. Kleinfeld of the U.S. Court of Appeals for the Ninth Circuit from 2006 to 2007. Following his clerkship, he was an associate at Sullivan & Cromwell until 2010, when he accepted a teaching position at the Hofstra University Maurice A. Deane School of Law. His article on the legal history of the Supreme Court case United States v. Miller, "The Peculiar Story of United States v. Miller" (2008) in the New York University Journal of Law and Liberty, was cited by Justice Antonin Scalia in his landmark majority opinion for the Supreme Court in District of Columbia v. Heller.

Justice John Paul Stevens later credited Frye's work in his final memoirs The Making of a Justice: Reflections on My First 94 Years for changing his approach in Heller.

== Filmmaking career ==
As a filmmaker and artist, Frye worked with experimental art, found footage, and archival images. He was temporarily a graduate student at New York University and held other positions as a teaching assistant and librarian. His films were presented at Mobile Home in San Francisco, X-Film and Chicago Filmmakers in Chicago, Anthology Film Archives in New York City, Starlight Cinema in Madison, and Eiga Arts in Japan. Some of his films were distributed by the Film-Makers' Cooperative in New York City, where he was employed and served as a board member.

After graduating from law school and working as a legal clerk, Frye worked as an associate at Sullivan & Cromwell from 2007 to 2010. While working, he ran for District Leader for the Manhattan Democrats on the Upper West Side in 2008, an election he lost by "14-8," according to his own admission. From 2010 to 2012 he taught at the Hofstra University School of Law. He and his then-wife, Penny Lane, worked on the film Our Nixon and started a Kickstarter for their work in 2011. Further grants, from Cinereach, the Jerome Foundation, New York State Council for the Arts, and the Tribeca Film Institute Documentary Fund, allowed them to continue their work.

== Law professor ==
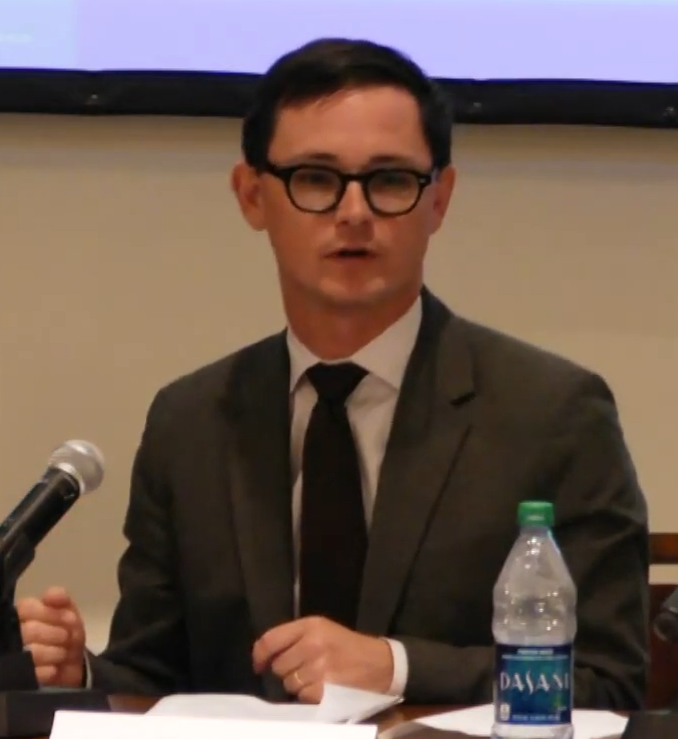
Brian L. Frye in 2012

Frye took a tenure-track position as a law professor at the University of Kentucky College of Law in 2012, where he currently is the Spears-Gilbert Associate Professor of Law. In 2013, Our Nixon was released at the 42nd International Film Festival Rotterdam, to wide critical acclaim. The film was distributed by CNN on television and theatrically by Cinedigm.

His legal scholarship focuses on issues of intellectual property, legal history, legal norms, concepts of ownership, and art. He is a leading scholar on plagiarism, art, and museum deaccessioning. In addition to his academic publications, he has co-written opinion articles in The Hill and Jurist on legal topics. He hosts a radio show on WUKY and a podcast interviewing other social science scholars, Ipse Dixit. The podcast received some attention from The New York Times after Justin R. Walker, of interest to the Times as a nominee to become a federal judge, appeared on it and discussed the role of the Federalist Society in the legal profession.

He advocates a radical conception of property ownership and academic citation, actively endorsing plagiarism. On his SSRN page, he sanctions plagiarism and copying of his work, stating: "All of my articles are licensed CC0/public domain. Please feel free to use them in any way that you like. I specifically authorize you to plagiarize my articles." He has published an article entirely written by an essay mill company, discussed his ideas on the podcasts The Legal Impact and Elucidations, and his work on plagiarism has been referenced by philosopher Agnes Callard in The Chronicle of Higher Education and The Point. In one of his articles, he re-attributed all of his written scholarship to any person who requested one of his works.

== Personal life ==
Frye has been married three times. His most recent marriage, to criminal law scholar and fellow law professor Maybell Romero, attracted public and scholarly attention. Both were married to other people and seeking divorce at the time of Frye's proposal, which appeared in the abstract to their co-written article "The Right to Unmarry" (2020) in the Cleveland State Law Review:

This is a marriage proposal in the form of a law review article. In this Article, I observe that Maybell Romero and I are in love. I want to marry her, and I believe she wants to marry me. At least I'll find out pretty soon. But we cannot marry each other right now, because we are both currently married to other people.

This proposal led to numerous tweets and commentaries on the Volokh Conspiracy law blog, Lawrence Solum's Legal Theory Blog, The Faculty Lounge, and Second Thoughts Blog of the Center for Firearms Law at Duke University. Romero accepted Frye's proposal, but both still had to wait for the dissolution of their previous marriages, a process lengthened by the COVID-19 pandemic. Both were eventually granted divorces from their respective marriages and married "on October 10, 2020 at 4:00 PM at the Gene Snyder Federal Courthouse" under Judge Justin R. Walker, "within about 24 hours of Brian's divorce finally getting finalized."

== Selected publications ==
=== Books ===
- Frye, Brian L. and Elizabeth Shiller. Professional Responsibility: An Open-Source Casebook. LawCarta, 2019.

=== Journal articles ===
- Frye, Brian L. and Maybell Romero. "The Right to Unmarry". Cle. L. Rev. 69 Clev. St. L. Rev. (2020): 89.
- Frye, Brian L. "Plagiarize This Paper". IDEA: The IP Law Review 60 (2020): 294.
- Frye, Brian L. "SEC No-Action Letter Request". Creighton L. Rev. (forthcoming).
- Frye, Brian L. "The Ballad of Harry James Tompkins". Akron L. Rev. 52 (2018): 531.
- Frye, Brian L. "Its Your Right: A Legal History of the Bacardi Cocktail". U. Miami Bus. L. Rev. 27 (2018): 1.
- Ryan Jr, Christopher J., and Brian L. Frye. "A Revealed-Preferences Ranking of Law Schools". Ala. L. Rev. 69 (2017): 495.
- Frye, Brian L. "Plagiarism Is Not a Crime". Duq. L. Rev. 54 (2016): 133.
- Frye, Brian L. "The Peculiar Story of United States v. Miller". NYU J. L. & Liberty 3 (2008): 48.

=== Other publications ===
- Nguyen, Lucille E., and Brian L. Frye. "Obama's Tan Suit Was an Impeachable Offense". Jurist, December 10, 2019.
- Edwards, Benjamin, and Brian L. Frye. "It's Hard Out There for an Immigrant; Lemon Lawyers Make It Harder". The Hill, January 19, 2018.
- Frye, Brian L. "'Me, I Just Film My Life': An Interview with Jonas Mekas". Senses of Cinema, August 26, 2007.
- "Brian Frye Interviewed by Jim Kreul and Ray Privett". Millennium Film Journal, 2001.
