= Nuts! (film) =

- Film poster
- Directed by: Penny Lane
- Written by: Thom Stylinski
- Based on: The Life of a Man: A Biography of John R. Brinkley by Clement Wood
- Produced by: James Belfer; Caitlin Mae Burke; Penny Lane; Daniel Shepard
- Edited by: Penny Lane; Thom Stylinski
- Music by: Brian McOmber
- Animation by: Drew Christie; Krystal Downs; Ace & Son Moving Picture Co., LLC; Michael Pisano; Hazel Lee Santino; Rose Stark; Julia Veldman
- Production company: Cartuna
- Release date: January 2016
- Running time: 79 minutes
- Country: United States
- Language: English

Nuts! is a 2016 partly-animated documentary film billed as the "mostly true story" about the controversial medical doctor and radio magnate John R. Brinkley. The documentary is adapted from The Life of A Man: Biography of John R. Brinkley by Clement Wood, directed by Penny Lane and edited by Penny Lane and Thom Stylinski. Nuts! won the Special Jury Award for Editing at its Sundance premiere in 2016.

== Plot ==
Nuts!, narrated by Gene Tognacci, documents the life and career of John R. Brinkley (1885-1942), a Milford, Kansas druggist-turned physician who purportedly discovered a cure for male impotence by implanting goat testicles into the scrotums of his human patients. Largely through the testimonials of his "satisfied" customers, Brinkley enjoyed a period of fame and fortune before drawing the attention of Morris Fishbein, editor of the Journal of American Medicine, and the American Medical Association, which revoked his license.

Brinkley is credited for building the world's most powerful radio station for the time, KFKB (Kansas Folk Know Better), popularizing country or "hillbilly" music, and inventing the infomercial with his own diatribes about public health. Brinkley ran into trouble with the Federal Radio Commission (now the Federal Communications Commission), which shut down his radio station. In response, Brinkley built the "million-watt-regulation-skirting border-blaster", XERA, in Mexico and continued broadcasting.

Brinkley ran for governor of Kansas in 1930 as a write-in candidate. It was reported he might have won had thousands of votes not been disqualified, possibly illegally, by his opponents.

Brinkley's fame and fortune deteriorated when he sued Fishbein for libel. It is revealed late in the movie that Brinkley also faced numerous wrongful death suits, had dubious academic credentials, and had an arrest record.

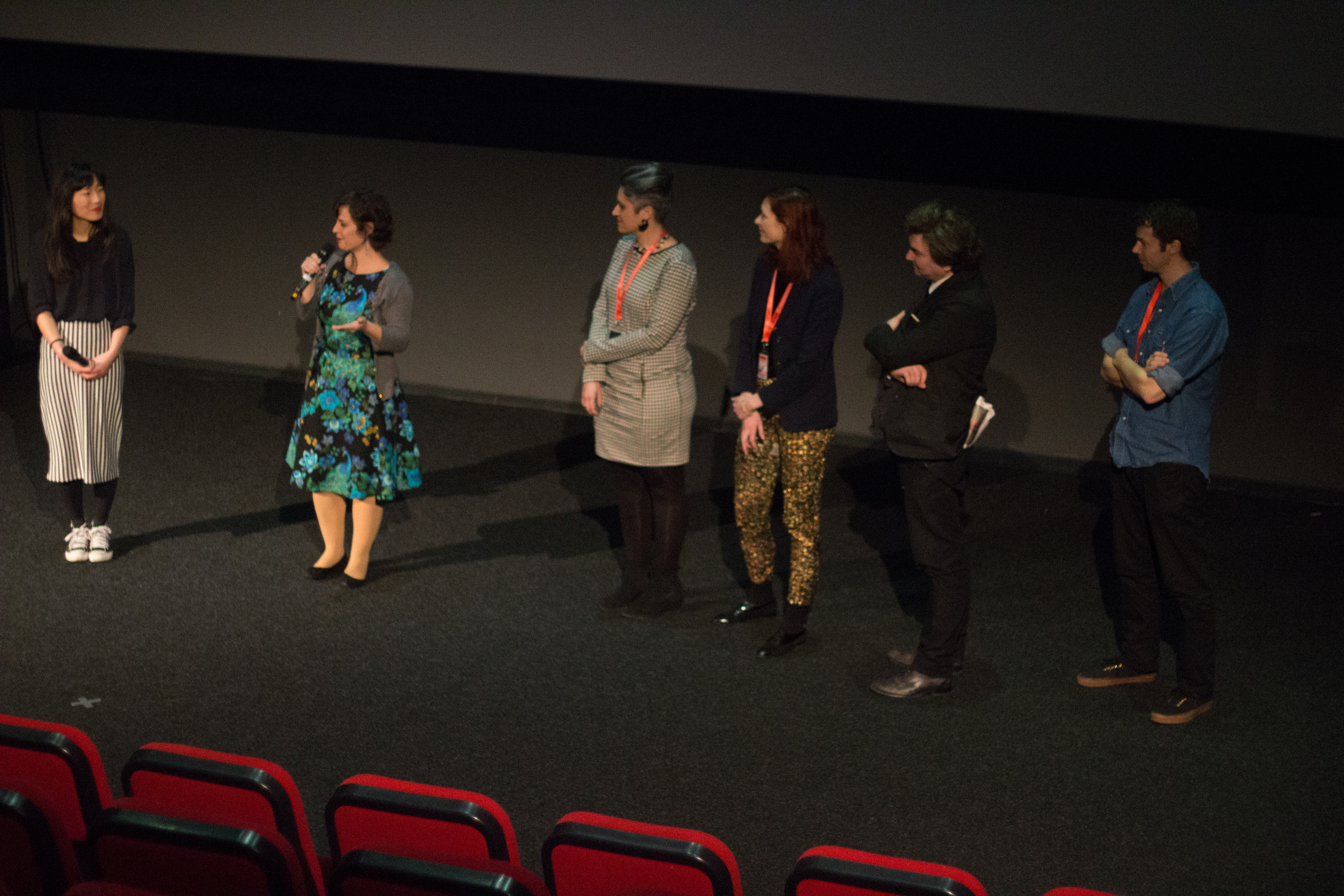
Penny Lane and several of the animators that worked on the film at the International Film Festival Rotterdam

== Production ==
The idea of making Nuts! came to Lane in 2009 when she read Charlatan: America's Most Dangerous Huckster, the Man Who Pursued Him, and the Age of Flimflam by Pope Brock. She found herself wondering if Brinkley's goat testicle cure worked, a question others asked her as she recounted the story. That current-day people could still be credulous, disappointed even, when she told them it was a "total quack cure" intrigued her.

"It's important that even those who consider ourselves very skeptical and think that we walk around employing our critical capacities all the time, nonetheless, we can all get fooled."

— Penny Lane

In the film, Lane uses a variety of traditional and non-traditional documentary techniques and materials to tell Brinkley's story: animated re-creations, archival film footage (including home movies and newsreels), a narration adapter closely from The Life of a Man, and interviews with present-day experts. Voice over work is done by Andy Boswell, John Causby, Kelly Mizell, Jeff Pillars, Thom Stylinski, and Fran Taylor.

Lane deliberately structured the movie so the viewer is "in the shoes of someone who could be fooled" by Brinkley and his ability to spin a good tale. The first part of the documentary is told from Brinkley's point of view: the story Brinkley would have told. Later in the film it is revealed that the audience has been manipulated in this way.

Both Lane and writer Thom Stylinski were interested in playing with "the conventions of documentary to make a point". According to Stylinski, film makers, including those making documentaries, manipulate information and audiences need to be educated about this. On the website which accompanies the film, Lane provides readers and viewers with an extensive database called "Notes on Nuts!” with over 300 footnotes so people can check her facts and disclosing creative choices: where she stayed true to the factual record, altered the chronology of events, or "simply made things up out of whole cloth".

== Reception ==
Reviewers called Nuts! humorous, entertaining, stranger than fiction, and "catnip for audiences of a certain type".

On the review aggregator website Rotten Tomatoes, 94% of 52 critics' reviews are positive, with an average rating of 7.9/10. The website's consensus reads: "Nuts! lives up to its title in the best way, offering a delightfully unorthodox look at a bizarre -- and largely unexplored -- chapter in American history." Metacritic, which uses a weighted average, assigned the film a score of 82 out of 100, based on 20 critics, indicating "universal acclaim".

Dennis Harvey wrote in Variety, "Lane and company created a sort of prankish ode to the classic American Dream of hard work and high ideals leading inevitably to fame, fortune and happiness. That's what Brinkley was really selling, and he mastered its packaging even if the content turned out to be mostly fraudulent".

Robert Abele wrote in the Los Angeles Times: "...if there is a chilling takeaway, it lies in the residue of consternation Lane leaves behind. You may think falling for goat glands is a pre-Internet age, snake-oil era folly. But call it something else, and who knows what you'll believe if the spiel is powerful enough?"

Ann Hornaday wrote that Lane's novel use of footnotes was a welcome and unique contribution to ongoing debates about truth and ethics in documentary film, but she also expressed concern that the footnotes appeared months after the movie's release, allowing "plenty of time for viewers to internalize the filmmaker's imaginary characters and outright fictions as historical truth".
