= A Maze =

Annual independent games festival in Germany

A MAZE.
- Genre: Independent games, digital art
- Locations: Berlin, Germany, Johannesburg, South Africa
- Years active: 12
- Founded: 2008
- Website: amaze-berlin.de

A Maze (stylized as A MAZE.) is an international series of events celebrating independent and arthouse games, immersive media and digital culture. Founded in 2008 by artistic director Thorsten S. Wiedemann, A MAZE. hosts the International Games and Playful Media Festival, held annually in Berlin since 2012, which feature annual awards and prizes for games and digital works.

== History ==
A MAZE. was launched by founder and artistic director Thorsten S. Wiedemann in Berlin in 2008. Wiedemann stated the event began at a local bar to showcase games and digital art, with the event expanding in 2012 to the first festival, Indie Connect, coinciding with the "Deutsche Gamestage" (later becoming International Games Week Berlin). The festivals are not primarily commercial and aim to celebrate games and digital culture as "not only a product" but a "medium of expression". In following years, the festival was also co-held in Johannesburg from 2012 to 2017. In 2019, A MAZE. experienced financial difficulties following the decision by the German Senate Department of Culture to discontinue funding for the program. Following this decision, the festival organisers launched a successful campaign on Kickstarter to partially fund the event in November 2019. During the onset of the COVID-19 pandemic in 2020, the event transitioned to a digital experience titled A MAZE ./ SPACE, hosting an online multiplayer showroom.

== Awards ==
A MAZE. Festival events feature awards and prizes decided by an independent jury. The festival awards features an open-ended selection criteria beyond traditional video games, with eligibility extended to interactive fiction and digital art. Nominees are judged by a selection committee, with submitted works reviewed and rated on "innovation, potential, interdisciplinarity, social, cultural and political impact, aesthetics and overall awesomeness". A shortlist of games is then reviewed by a final jury of five to select award winners, including the winner of the previous year. Winners of each category receive a €1000 prize, with the main 'Most Amazing Award' prize winner receiving €2000.

Awards at the A MAZE. Festival
Date	Work	Author	Award
21–24 July 2020	Promesa	Julian Palacios	Digital Moment Award
21–24 July 2020	Brave Mouse Cartographer	common opera	Human Human Machine Award
21–24 July 2020	Knife Sisters	Transcenders Media	Long Feature Award
21–24 July 2020	Cook your way	Enric Granzotto Llagostera	Explorer Award
21–24 July 2020	Time Bandit	Joel Jordon	Audience Award
21–24 July 2020	Nightmare Temptation Academy	Lena NW & Costcodreamgurl	Most Amazing Award
21–24 July 2020	N/A	Studio Oleomingus	Humble New Talent Award
21–24 July 2021	Adventures of Harriharri	Harold Hejazi	Digital Moment Award
21–24 July 2021	Map to Utopia	Fringe ensemble / Platform theatre	Human Human Machine Award
21–24 July 2021	I Am Dead	Hollow Ponds	Long Feature Award
21–24 July 2021	Before Your Eyes	Goodbyeworld Games	Explorer Award
21–24 July 2021	Time Bandit	Joel Jordon	Audience Award
21–24 July 2021	Stilstand	Ida Hartmann & Niila Games	Most Amazing Award
21–24 July 2021	Colestia	David Cribb	Humble New Talent Award
13–17 May 2022	BORE DOME	Goblin Rage	Digital Moment Award
13–17 May 2022	Okthryssia and Saturnia's Bureaucratic Adventures	Fantasia Malware	Human Human Machine Award
13–17 May 2022	Norco	Raw Fury / Geography of Robots	Long Feature Award
13–17 May 2022	We Are One	Flat Head Studio	Explorer Award
13–17 May 2022	Titanic II: Orchestra for Dying at Sea	Flan Falacci	Audience Award
13–17 May 2022	Tux and Fanny	Albert Birney and Gabriel Koenig	Most Amazing Award
13–17 May 2022	A Rejection Story!	Faezeh Khomeyrani	Wings Award
10–13 May 2023	Extreme Evolution: Drive to Divinity	Sam Atlas	Digital Moment Award
10–13 May 2023	The MetaMovie Presents: Alien Rescue	The MetaMovie	Human Human Machine Award
10–13 May 2023	Season: A Letter to the Future	Scavengers Studio	Long Feature Award
10–13 May 2023	Lost on Mars	Trey Ramm	Explorer Award
10–13 May 2023	Viewfinder	Sad Owl Studios	Audience Award
10–13 May 2023	Player Non Player	Jonathan Coryn	Most Amazing Award
10–13 May 2023	Psychotic Bathtub – The Story of an Escalating Mind. And Ducks.	natsha	Wings Award
8–11 May 2024	Grunn	Tom van den Boogaart	Digital Moment Award
8–11 May 2024	Waxwing	Common Opera	Human Human Machine Award
8–11 May 2024	Echostasis	Enigma Studio	Long Feature Award
8–11 May 2024	BlueSuburbia	Nathalie Lawhead	Explorer Award
8–11 May 2024	Non-Virtual Reality Games	3m Jump	Audience Award
8–11 May 2024	No Case Should Be Left Unsolved	Somi	Most Amazing Award
8–11 May 2024	Miniatures	Other Tales Interactive	Wings Award
14–17 May 2025	Some Goodbyes We Made	Safe Flight Games and Joey Schulz	Digital Moment Award
14–17 May 2025	Synch.Live	Hillary Leone and the Synch.Live Team	Human Human Machine Award
14–17 May 2025	Threshold	Julien Eveillé	Long Feature Award
14–17 May 2025	Flora	Flora	Explorer Award
14–17 May 2025	Breaking News	Danil Bialo, Tamir Herzberg, and Evyatar Cohen	Audience Award
14–17 May 2025	Despelote	Julián Cordero, Sebastián Valbuena, Gabe Cuzzillo	Most Amazing Award
14–17 May 2025	Curiosmos	Céline & the Silly Stars	Wings Award
