= Capitol Years =

American indie rock band

The Capitol Years
- Origin: Philadelphia, Pennsylvania U.S.
- Genres: Pop, rock
- Label: Park the Van
- Past members: Shai Halperin; Dave Wayne Daniels; Jeff Van Newkirk; David John Hartley; Peter Rinko; Adam Granduciel; Kyle Lloyd
- Website: capitolyears.com

The Capitol Years is an indie rock band founded by principal songwriter, Shai Halperin, (aka Shai, Son of Eli). Based in Philadelphia, he has released 2 albums of solo work as "The Capitol Years" as well as 2 albums and an EP with a full band. In 2010 he returned as a soloist recording music under the name Sweet Lights.

== History ==
The Capitol Years debuted in July 2000 with a full-length album entitled Meet Yr Acres. The album was produced in Halperin's studio apartment on South Street, Meet Yr Acres began as a series of self-engineered home recordings. With most vocals, guitars, and percussion captured on a digital 4-track, Halperin connected with producer Thom Monahan who transferred the project to a 1/2-inch analog tape 8-track machine at a home studio in Northampton, Massachusetts north of Springfield. Monahan, who was a member and producer of the Pernice Brothers and future producer of records by Devendra Banhart; Vetiver, a folk band; and others helped Halperin flesh out the initially sparse tracks. The end result fell somewhere between the bedroom rock of the Indie rock band, Guided By Voices, the hushed melodies of George Harrison, and the lo-fi electro weirdness of Beck. The album also included a cover of The Velvet Underground's "All Tomorrow's Parties".

Originally distributed on cd-r under the "Shai, Son of Eli" moniker, Meet Yr Acres found a proper home with Full Frame Records of San Francisco and was officially released under the band name "The Capitol Years". It received positive marks from numerous press outlets including CMJ in addition to Magnet magazine where it landed on the "Top 10 Hidden Treasures" list for 2001.

After recording Meet Yr Acres, Halperin recruited Dave Wayne Daniels on bass, Kyle Lloyd on drums, and after a year performing as a three piece, Jeff Van Newkirk, on guitar and vocal harmonies. In 2005 the band welcomed Adam Granduciel on guitar after he briefly filled in on bass for Wayne Daniels during a Spring 2005 tour of the US. Granduciel later formed the band, The War on Drugs. Other musicians known to have played one or more shows as a member of the band include Peter Rinko, songwriter and Josh Newman, a singer/guitarist for Enemy Love.

After the debut, The Capitol Years released the acoustic P_footin and the full-band EP, Jewelry Store. National and local press attention increased and the band was named "Best of Philly" in 2003. The Capitol Years opened the first reunion show on April 13, 2004 for The Pixies, a band who had not played together for 12 years.

The Capitol Years have toured the U.S. multiple times as well as the UK, Spain, and Israel. Since 2001 the band has played with many notable contemporaries including The Walkmen, Daniel Johnston, The Kills, The Brian Jonestown Massacre, Dr. Dog, The Spinto Band, The Frogs, Lilys, Ted Leo, and Beachwood Sparks, as well as comedian David Cross. In 2005, the band released Let Them Drink in the United States and Spain.

On September 12, 2006, they released Dance Away The Terror on Park the Van Records which was also home to Dr. Dog and The High Strung, a band from Detroit. Pitchfork Media said that the album is "the band's best full length yet" and again, Magnet credited the band with delivering one of its Top 20 Albums Of The Year. In early 2007, Halperin recorded a version of Johnston's "True Love Will Find You In The End". The song soon became a staple of the band's live set and appeared in an online video featuring Yuri who is Shai, Son of Eli's cat.

On February 22, 2008, the band supported and played as backing band for Daniel Johnston at the Trocadero Theatre in Philadelphia. The Capitol Years joined him on stage and Johnston performed The Beatles' "I'm So Tired" as well as John Lennon's "Isolation" for the first time in addition to many of his own classics. In June 2008, the band resumed backing band duties with Johnston on a brief tour of the Northeast. The tour-mates added The Beatles' Help to the live repertoire. Backstage, Johnston and The Capitol Years were filmed in a piano-based sing-a-long of more Beatles classics including "A Day in the Life", "For No One", "Cry Baby Cry", and Paul McCartney's "Too Many People". In November 2008, the song "Revolutions" was voted "Single of the Week" on a popular BBC Radio 2 program airing in the UK.

Growing interest in the UK led to the release of a second single, "You Can Stay There", a tour of the country, and a performance at the Glastonbury Festival near Pilton, Somerset in June 2009. The tour also included a visit to the BBC and a performance/interview with one time The Old Grey Whistle Test host Bob Harris. In October 2009, The Capitol Years again toured with Daniel Johnston going to the east coast of the U.S. and Canada. In 2010, Halperin began writing and recording with a new name, Sweet Lights.

== Discography ==
- 2001 - Meet Yr Acres
- 2003 - P_footin
- 2003 - Jewelry Store
- 2004 - Ramona/Loretta Split 7 inch
- 2005 - Let Them Drink
- 2006 - Dance Away the Terror
- 2010 - ''Sweet Lights - Sweet Lights''
