= Our Nixon =

2013 American documentary film by Penny Lane

- Theatrical release poster.
- Directed by: Penny Lane
- Produced by: Brian L. Frye; Penny Lane
- Starring: Richard Nixon; H.R. Haldeman; John Ehrlichman; Dwight Chapin; Henry Kissinger; Ron Ziegler; Larry Higby
- Cinematography: H.R. Haldeman, John Ehrlichman, Dwight Chapin
- Edited by: Francisco Bello
- Music by: Hrishikesh Hirway
- Production company: Dipper Films
- Distributed by: CNN Films and Cinedigm
- Release dates: March 9, 2013 (SXSW Festival); August 1, 2013 (CNN Television)
- Running time: 85 minutes
- Country: United States
- Language: English

Our Nixon is an all-archival documentary providing a view of the Nixon presidency through the use of Super-8 format home movies filmed by top Nixon aides H.R. Haldeman, Dwight Chapin and John Ehrlichman, combined with other historical material such as interviews, oral histories and news clips. It was directed by Penny Lane.

== Background ==
Throughout the Richard Nixon presidency (1969–1974) three of his top White House aides—chief of staff H. R. Haldeman, domestic affairs adviser John Ehrlichman, and special assistant Dwight Chapin—extensively documented their experiences with Super 8 home movie cameras, creating a visual record of over 500 reels. These films were seized by the FBI during the Watergate investigation, then filed away for almost 40 years. Our Nixon is an all-archival documentary presenting these home movies together with other material, including excerpts from the secretly recorded Nixon White House tapes, contemporary news reports, and later interviews with the three staffers.

== Release ==
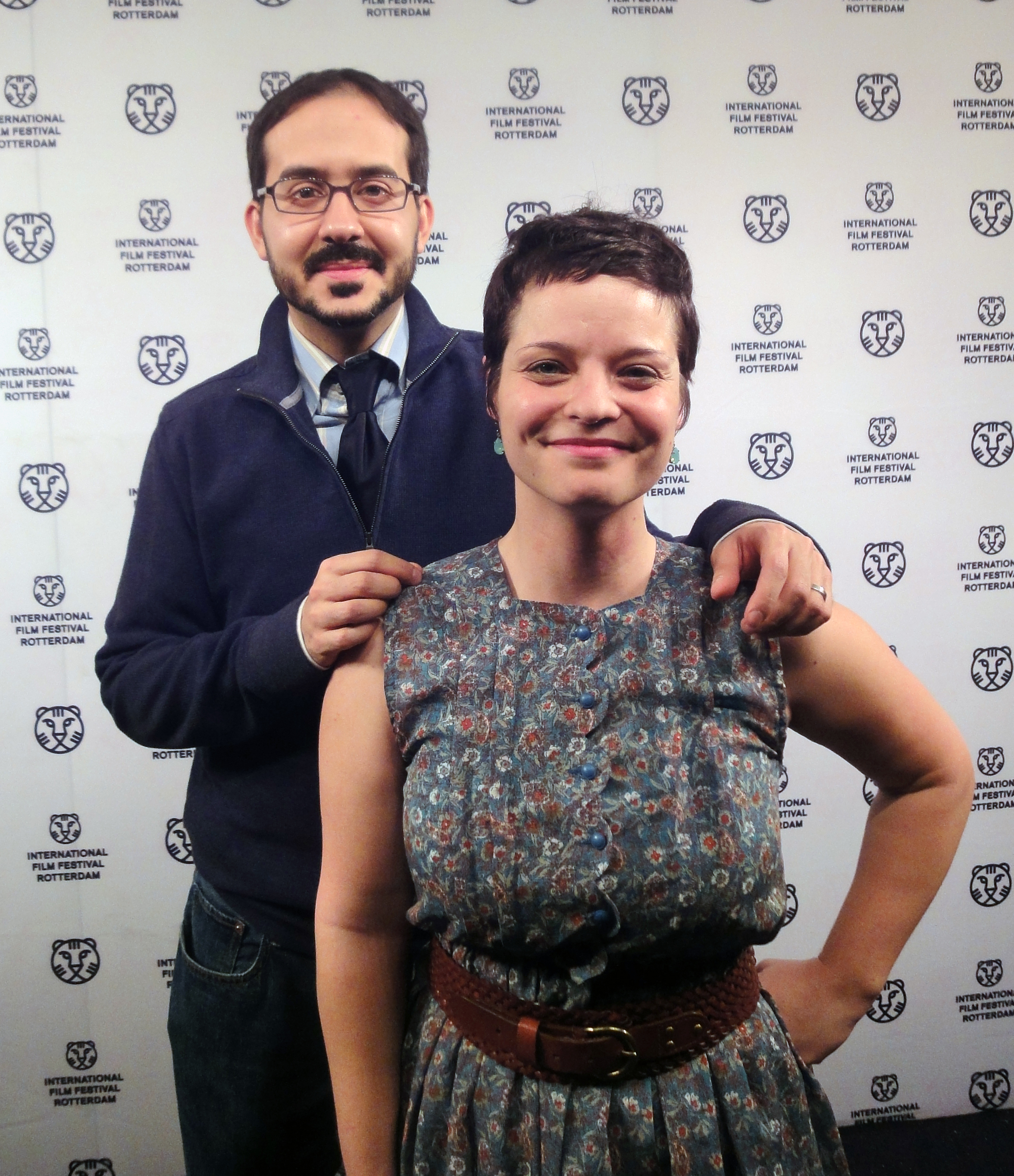
Penny Lane and Francisco Bello at the International Film Festival of Rotterdam 2013 to promote Our Nixon

Our Nixon appeared at the 42nd International Film Festival Rotterdam. The film has subsequently screened at notable film festivals, including, among others, AFI DOCS in Washington, DC, the Los Angeles Film Festival, the 39th Annual Seattle International Film Festival, where Our Nixon won the 2013 Grand Jury award for Best Documentary Film, the 51st Ann Arbor Film Festival, where it won the Ken Burns Award for Best of the Festival, the 11th Annual Independent Film Festival of Boston, where it won the Karen Schmeer Award for Excellence in Documentary Editing, the 19th Annual Nantucket Film Festival, where it won the Adrienne Shelly Award for Excellence in Filmmaking, and the 9th Annual Traverse City Film Festival, where it won the Founders Prize for Best Documentary.

Our Nixon was also chosen as the closing night film for the Film Society of Lincoln Center and Museum of Modern Art New Directors/New Films Festival in New York City.

Our Nixon made its United States television premiere on CNN on August 1, 2013, and was released theatrically by Cinedigm on August 30, 2013.

== Reception ==
The film received positive reviews from critics. On review aggregator Rotten Tomatoes, the film has an approval rating of 91% based on 43 reviews, with an average rating of 7.5/10. The site's critics' consensus reads: "Our Nixon offers a privileged personal perspective on a White House soon to be derailed by scandal, giving viewers an intimate look at the people behind the political legend." On Metacritic, the film holds an aggregated score of 72 out of 100 based on 14 reviews, indicating "generally favorable reviews".

Stanley Kauffmann of The New Republic wrote that "[Penny Lane] states that the film was produced entirely from previously extant material, which makes it especially interesting", and concluded: "So we have here a capably done account of a presidential career that was wrecked by a crime that was unnecessary." John Hartl, writing for The Seattle Times, gave the film a score of 3 stars out of 4, and said that "The result is maudlin beyond belief, especially Nixon’s farewell to the aides he’s in the process of firing, but other moments simply register as shockingly out of touch."

Matt Zoller Seitz of RogerEbert.com gave the film a score of 3 stars out of 4, writing that the film "often plays like a mortifying companion to the Nixon-period sitcom "The Wonder Years"", and said that the film's best quality was "its willingness to paint its key players as people, not villains or types. Rather than excuse or soft-pedal their bad deeds, this approach makes them seem more comprehensible and real—like people we might know, but with power." He concluded that the film "charts changing times and generational attitudes simply by showing us particular moments."

David Hinckley, writing for the New York Daily News, was more critical in his review of the film, writing: "For a while, it looks like "Our Nixon" will give us a different perspective on one of the most documented men in modern history, the late President Richard M. Nixon. Right around the time it hits Watergate, though, it falls onto a familiar path, concluding he planted the seeds of his presidency's own doom. We sort of knew that." Peter Howell of the Toronto Star wrote: "Our Nixon shows that while the stooges were good at scheming (up until Watergate, at least) they sucked as filmmakers."
