= Moonwink =

Studio album by The Spinto Band
- Released: October 7, 2008
- Recorded: July 2007
- Genre: Indie rock
- Label: Park the Van (U.S.); Fierce Panda (UK)

The Spinto Band chronology
Nice and Nicely Done (2005)	Moonwink (2008)	Shy Pursuit (2012)

Moonwink is the sixth studio album by The Spinto Band. It was released on October 7, 2008 in North America and September 22, 2008 worldwide. It leaked onto various p2p sites on August 7.

== Track listing ==
No.	Title	Length
1.	"Later On"	3:35
2.	"Vivian, Don't"	2:44
3.	"Summer Grof"	2:27
4.	"The Carnival"	3:26
5.	"Needlepoint"	3:10
6.	"The Cat's Pajamas"	3:12
7.	"They All Laughed"	3:23
8.	"Pumpkins & Paisley"	2:53
9.	"Ain't This the Truth"	3:22
10.	"Alphabetical Order"	2:41
11.	"The Black Flag"	3:46
12.	"The Cat's Pajamas" (Acoustic) (Bonus Track)	3:13

== Release history ==
Professional ratings
Review scores
Source	Rating
Allmusic	3/5 stars
Clash (magazine)	3.5/5 stars
Drowned In Sound	2.5/5 stars
Pitchfork Media	5.9/10 stars
This Is Fake DIY	7/10 stars

Country	Release date
Worldwide	September 22, 2008
Canada	October 7, 2008
United States	October 7, 2008
