= In My Bed (Rotimi song) =

Song by Rotimi featuring Wale

from the EP The Beauty of Becoming
- Released: December 13, 2019
- Genre: Afrobeats; Contemporary R&B/soul
- Length: 3:05
- Label: FrontRo Music; EMPIRE
- Songwriter(s): Edgar Etienne; Enya; Harmony Samuels; Maurice Toby; Nicky Ryan; Olubowale Akintimehin; Olurotimi Akinosho; Roma Ryan; Varren Wade
- Producer(s): Harmony Samuels

Rotimi chronology
"In My Bed" (2019)	"Fall Back" (2019)

Music video
- "In My Bed (Official music video)"

Official audio
- "In My Bed (Audio)"

"In My Bed" is an Afrobeats-infused R&B/soul song by Nigerian-American actor and singer Rotimi, released on December 13, 2019, through FrontRo Music Group and EMPIRE from his third extended play (EP) The Beauty of Becoming. It features guest appearance from Wale and production from H-Money as it was certified Gold by the Recording Industry Association of America (RIAA). The song contains a sample of "Boadicea" (1987) by Irish singer Enya

The song peaked at 41 on the UK Independent Singles and Albums Charts and peaked at number 4 on Official Independent Singles Breakers Chart.

== Music video ==
The visuals to "In My Bed" were released on September 17, 2020 via YouTube through Rotimi's channel. As of September 2023, the music video sits on 93,6 million views.

== Charts ==
Weekly chart performance for "In My Bed"
Chart (2020)	Peak position
US R&B/Hip-Hop Airplay (Billboard)	21

== Certifications ==
Region	Certification	Certified units/sales
United States (RIAA)	Gold	500,000^{‡}
^{‡} Sales+streaming figures based on certification alone.
