= Liverspots and Astronots =

- Genre: Adult animation; Comedy
- Created by: Rob Bohn; Nate Milton
- Voices of: Colin Mochrie; Keith David; Nicole Sullivan
- Composers: Buck St. Thomas; Kyle Sawaia; Noah Pardo
- Country of origin: United States
- Original language: English
- No. of seasons: 1
- No. of episodes: 21

Production
- Executive producers: Rob Bohn; Nate Milton; Daniel Shepard; James Belfer; Adam Belfer
- Editor: Nate Milton
- Running time: 4–8 minutes
- Production company: Cartuna

Original release
- Network: Facebook Watch
- Release: October 18 – November 29, 2018

Liverspots and Astronots is an American adult animated comedy web series created by Rob Bohn and Nate Milton that premiered on October 18, 2018, on Facebook Watch.

== Cast and characters ==
=== Main ===
- Colin Mochrie as Roosi
- Keith David as Dr. Pesh
- Nicole Sullivan as Big Man / Debra

=== Recurring ===
- Brennan Lee Mulligan as Lancery / Yuri / Kurt Vonnegut / Jackie & Johnny
- Claire Neumann as Gamblr / Jefferson / Dark Matter / Suzie B
- Maria Bamford as Toothpick / The Yog / Inspector Cabbage / Abrams & Wopsy / Shromp
- John Waters as O-Dor
- Pauly Shore as Fuff
- Selma Blair as Rosie / Inspector Arugula
- Dick Cavett as Montgomery Pesh
- Hearty White as Giant Turtle / HVAC
- Daniel Shepard as Goonter
- Rob Bohn as Terry / Number 2
- Nate Milton as Dumpy / Number 1

== Episodes ==
No.	Title	Directed by	Written by	Original release date
1	"The Remains"	Rob Bohn, Nate Milton & Seth Brady	Daniel Shepard	October 18, 2018
2	"The Ice Storm"	Rob Bohn, Nate Milton & Jared Deal	Jeremy Bent	October 18, 2018
3	"The Exorcism of Odor"	Rob Bohn, Nate Milton & Seth Brady	Sarah Rose Siskind & Daniel Shepard	October 18, 2018
4	"The Talent Show"	Rob Bohn & Nate Milton	Rob Bohn, Nate Milton, Daniel Shepard & Diana McCorry	October 25, 2018
5	"The Two Dollah Bill"	Rob Bohn & Nate Milton	Rob Bohn, Nate Milton, Daniel Shepard & Diana McCorry	October 25, 2018
6	"The Yog"	Rob Bohn, Nate Milton & Jared Deal	Jeremy Bent	October 25, 2018
7	"Inspector Cabbage"	Rob Bohn, Nate Milton & Seth Brady	Sarah Rose Siskind	November 1, 2018
8	"The Egg"	Rob Bohn & Nate Milton	Rob Bohn, Nate Milton, Daniel Shepard & Diana McCorry	November 1, 2018
9	"Cosmic Saver"	Rob Bohn & Nate Milton	Rob Bohn, Nate Milton, Daniel Shepard & Diana McCorry	November 1, 2018
10	"The Hide and Seek"	Rob Bohn & Nate Milton	Rob Bohn, Nate Milton, Daniel Shepard & Diana McCorry	November 8, 2018
11	"The Exterminator Part 1"	Rob Bohn & Nate Milton	Rob Bohn, Nate Milton, Daniel Shepard & Diana McCorry	November 8, 2018
12	"The Exterminator Part 2"	Rob Bohn & Nate Milton	Rob Bohn, Nate Milton, Daniel Shepard & Diana McCorry	November 8, 2018
13	"The Infinite Monkey"	Rob Bohn, Nate Milton & Jared Deal	Daniel Shepard	November 15, 2018
14	"The Older Brother"	Rob Bohn, Nate Milton & Seth Brady	Jeremy Bent & Daniel Shepard	November 15, 2018
15	"The Dustys"	Rob Bohn, Nate Milton & Jared Deal	Sarah Rose Siskind	November 15, 2018
16	"The Mirror"	Rob Bohn, Nate Milton & Seth Brady	Daniel Shepard	November 22, 2018
17	"The Sons of Jefferson"	Rob Bohn, Nate Milton & Jared Deal	Sarah Rose Siskind	November 22, 2018
18	"The Homunculus"	Rob Bohn, Nate Milton & Seth Brady	Daniel Shepard	November 22, 2018
19	"The Smarmy Army"	Rob Bohn, Nate Milton & Jared Deal	Jeremy Bent	November 29, 2018
20	"The Third Eye Infection"	Rob Bohn, Nate Milton & Seth Brady	Jeremy Bent	November 29, 2018
21	"The Inner Planet"	Rob Bohn, Nate Milton & Jared Deal	Daniel Shepard	November 29, 2018

== Production ==
=== Development ===
On September 14, 2018, it was announced that Facebook Watch had given the production a series order for a first season consisting of twenty-one episodes. Production companies involved with the series were slated to consist of digital media company Cartuna.

=== Casting ===
Alongside the initial series announcement, it was confirmed that the series would feature the voices of Colin Mochrie, Keith David, Nicole Sullivan, Maria Bamford, John Waters, Pauly Shore, Selma Blair, Dick Cavett and Hearty White.

=== Premiere ===
The pilot episode of the series premiered as a sneak peek at the 2018 New York Comic Con.
