= Adam Green's Aladdin =

2016 film directed by Adam Green

- Digital release poster
- Directed by: Adam Green
- Written by: Adam Green
- Produced by: Adam Green; Yasmin Green
- Starring: Adam Green; Alia Shawkat; Natasha Lyonne; Jack Dishel; Macaulay Culkin; Nicole LaLiberte; Francesco Clemente; Bip Ling; Parker Kindred; Har Mar Superstar; Zoë Kravitz; Penn Badgley
- Cinematography: Dima Dubson
- Edited by: Dima Dubson
- Music by: Adam Green
- Production companies: Aladdin Green Productions; Motor Productions
- Distributed by: Cartuna (Blu-ray)
- Release date: April 15, 2016 (United States)
- Running time: 82 minutes
- Country: United States
- Language: English

Adam Green's Aladdin is a 2016 American fantasy comedy-drama film written, directed by, and starring Adam Green. It presents a modern take on the Arabian Nights classic tale. The film stars Alia Shawkat, Natasha Lyonne, Jack Dishel, Macaulay Culkin, and Nicole LaLiberte. The film explores themes of technology, government repression, greed, and true love. The film was partially funded through the crowdfunding website Kickstarter, and filmed over the summer of 2014. The film was released on April 15, 2016, through video on demand and on Blu-ray on November 1, 2024.

== Premise ==
The film revolves around Aladdin's dysfunctional family, who live in an average American city ruled by a corrupt sultan with a decadent socialite daughter.

== Cast ==
- Adam Green as Aladdin
- Alia Shawkat as Emily
- Natasha Lyonne as Mom
- Jack Dishel as Uncle Gary/The Sultan
- Macaulay Culkin as Ralph
- Nicole LaLiberte as Ms. President
- Francesco Clemente as Mustafa, The Genie
- Bip Ling as Princess Barbara
- Parker Kindred as Genarro Russo
- Har Mar Superstar as British Druggie Guy
- John Wiley as Farmer Dave
- Zoë Kravitz as Miner with Lamp
- Sophia Lamar as The Stripper
- Devendra Banhart as Saucemaker
- Rodrigo Amarante as Mariachi Singer
- Binki Shapiro as Miner
- Andrew VanWyngarden as Guardian of the Lamp
- Penn Badgley as Prince of Monaco
- Leo Fitzpatrick as Bouncer
- Neil Harbisson as Miner

== Production ==
The film raised money through Kickstarter, with Green admitting that the bulk of the cost was spent on creating the cardboard sets, noting that "Most people did the movie for basically no money". Some of the smaller parts were performed by artists doing residencies at the nearby Pioneer Works studio. Green has stated that falling in love with his wife, Yasmin Green, heavily influenced the plot and that wedding vows that Aladdin gives are nearly identical to his own.

After completing the project, Green said he had some problems distributing it, with most film festivals finding it too "off brand". However, after releasing the trailer online, Green started to get offers for screening the film. Vice Media also got in contact with Green after seeing the trailer, asking him to pitch a TV show for their Viceland channel.
