= Tanya Ling =

Fashion designer (born 1966)

- Born: Tanya Ling; 1966 (age 59–60); Calcutta, India
- Education: Central Saint Martins College of Art and Design, London
- Occupations: Artist, Designer, and Fashion Illustrator
- Spouse: William Ling

Tanya Ling (born Calcutta 1966) is an artist, designer and fashion illustrator.

== Early life ==
Ling studied at Central Saint Martins College of Art and Design in London before working in Paris in the design studio of Christian Lacroix.

In 2002 Ling launched her own ready-to-wear collection, which was featured in the windows of Henri Bendel on 5th Avenue, New York where the collection was sold.

In 2011 over fifty of her drawings were acquired by the Victoria and Albert Museum in London. In 2014, a group of her paintings and sculptures were acquired for the Murderme collection.

Ling's solo exhibition "We Have Life," held in London in 2017, featured a prominent theme of horses.
