= Tux and Fanny (video game) =

2021 video game

- Steam cover art
- Developer: Ghost Time Games
- Designers: Albert Birney, Gabriel Koenig
- Platforms: Windows, macOS, Linux, Nintendo Switch
- Release: 9 September 2021
- Genre: Adventure game
- Mode: Single-player

Tux and Fanny is a video game created by Albert Birney. Developed by Ghost Time Games, and published by Means Interactive in 2021, the video game was described as a "retro-inspired puzzle game". The game is an adaptation of an animated film and show of the same name. Players control the titular characters as they explore and discover their home and surroundings, collecting items and solving puzzles, whilst also completing secondary tasks such as bug collecting and bird-watching. The game was released to a positive reception from reviewers, receiving the 'Most Amazing' Award at the Berlin A MAZE Festival and nominations at the Independent Games Festival in 2022.

== Gameplay ==
A screenshot of Tux and Fanny

Tux and Fanny is a point-and-click adventure game in which players explore the house of the titular characters and surrounding environment and discover and interact with items. Players alternate between control of Tux, Fanny, a cat, and a flea, with interaction between the characters necessary to solve various puzzles in the game. The game features an inventory-based system where players are able to combine and use collected items, and a points-based scoring system, with points awarded when players collect items. Exploration throughout the world can lead to the discovery of interactive items, including minigames playable on a household computer, and audio tracks playable on a record player. The game features many items or tasks that can be collected and logged by players, including collecting certain types of bugs or plants, identifying different species of birds, and identifying different shapes of clouds. Tux and Fanny also features a library of picture books designed by the developers and other artists, additionally containing the novel Moby Dick which can be read in its entirety by the player.

== Development ==
Tux and Fanny was developed by a partnership of Albert Birney and Gabriel Koenig, with Birney creating most of the game's art and writing, and Koenig "building the game itself, writing code, and assembling levels". Birney is based in Baltimore, and Koenig in Vancouver. The pair collaborated following an open invitation from Birney on Twitter to find a developer to adapt his 2019 film Tux and Fanny into a "point-and-click adventure computer game". The game was constructed in Unity3D, with the pixel art graphics imported from Pixilart, a free online tool. Birney stated that a "core component" of Tux and Fanny was the theme of connection during the time of the COVID-19 pandemic, with the game providing an "opportunity to infiltrate the (video game) medium with a reminder that there's a real tangible world outside of the digital one, full of mystery, absurdity, and beauty." Birney stated that the game's evocation of 8-bit video games were influenced by his childhood experiences playing games on the Nintendo Entertainment System with friends and family, stating "I had somehow found an outlet to channel all my childhood game ideas into something you could actually play." This also prompted the developers to "make (their) own versions" of games from this era in the design of the minigames in Tux and Fanny, with the game becoming a "perfect home (for) stray miscreant ideas" for gameplay mechanics during the development process.

== Reception ==
Tux and Fanny received a positive reception from publications, with reviewers praising its tone and ingenuous depiction of the minutiae of daily life. Vulgar Knight noted the game's "innocence" and "child-like perspective", writing that the game is "pure, playful and of an inquisitive, poetic nature". Drawing comparisons to the game's release amid the context of the COVID-19 pandemic, Kat Brewster of Rock Paper Shotgun praised the game's depiction of the "little adventures of day-to-day life", describing the game as a "love letter to being outside, curling up with a good book (and) wandering around the woods." Sarah Maria Griffin of The Guardian described the game as "poignant" and noted the game "feels very personal, which tempers the surrealism and grounds what is a weird experience." John Walker of Buried Treasure praised the writing as "amazing throughout, combining the naive joy of the two main characters, with the metaphysical angst of the game's wildlife."

Critics praised the open-ended and naturalistic design of the game's puzzle mechanics. Nicole Carpenter of Polygon noted the game's "appealing sense of ease" oriented around "the joy and surprise of discovery", stating "instead of stressing out or getting stuck on an idea, I simply move along and keep searching the world". Writing for The Guardian, Sarah Maria Griffin stated "to categorise this as a point-and-click adventure, or an exploration game, or a puzzle game feels wrong, though it incorporates elements of all three genres while subverting them at every turn". Several reviewers also favorably compared the design of the game to point-and-click adventure games from Sierra, including the Police Quest and Leisure Suit Larry series.

Several reviewers praised the game's interactivity and detail in its variety of items, secrets and minigames. Sarah Maria Griffin of The Guardian wrote that the "many tiny comics and zines that are a joy to browse through", and praised the game's minigames as "purposeful and even occasionally poetic in their execution". Shaun Roopra of Thumbsticks praised the game as "full of surprises", writing "it's a game that clearly understands the tactile beauty of the interactive medium", highlighting he was "shocked at the variety" of the "inventive and fun" minigames. Games Asylum wrote that "finding objects and digging through the world is satisfying as you unlock new and bigger areas", expressing surprise at "how detailed, involved and large the world was." John Walker of Buried Treasure stated "so much has been poured into this, every tiny crack packed with details and extras. The sheer number of computer games to find and play, some dreadful, some pretty decent, is bewildering."

=== Accolades ===
Tux and Fanny received the 'Most Amazing' award at the Berlin A MAZE Festival in 2022, with panel member Ida Hartmann describing the game as "utterly unique and strange experience in a universe that keeps on giving" and praising the game for its "creativity and playfulness with its poetic and meaningful micro-games, imaginative, explorative visuals and weird personal stories". The game was also a nominee for the 'Excellence in Narrative' and 'Nuovo Award' categories at the 2022 Independent Games Festival.
