= Sweet Lights =

American indie pop act

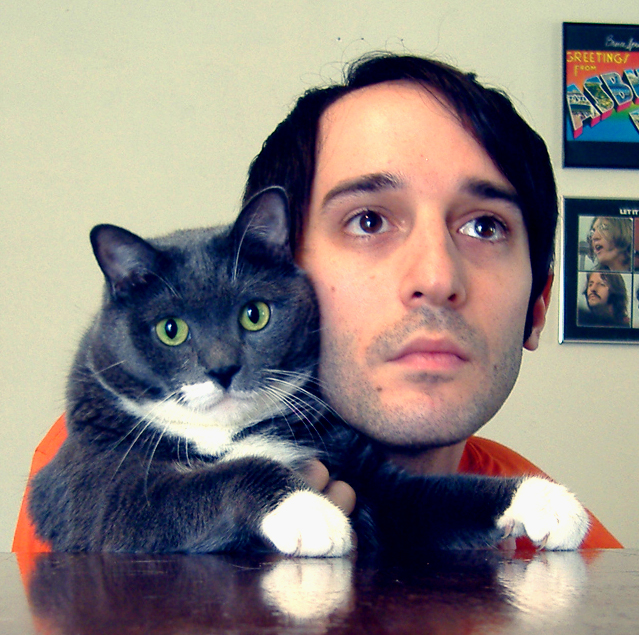

Background information
- Origin: Philadelphia, Pennsylvania, United States
- Genres: Indie pop, indie rock
- Years active: 2010–2026
- Label: Poor Poor Records
- Members: Shai Halperin
- Website: sweetlights.bandcamp.com

Sweet Lights was founded by principal songwriter, Shai Halperin. Based in Philadelphia, Pennsylvania, Halperin had previously released 2 albums of solo work and 2 albums and an EP with a full band under the name The Capitol Years.

In 2009, Halperin placed The Capitol Years on hiatus and began operating as "Sweet Lights", a project that would feature him performing all vocals and all instrumentation. Early versions of Sweet Lights tracks were posted online in 2010, soon to be accompanied by a handful of videos Halperin created, mostly from borrowed footage and old home movies. Several notable critics and blogs published reviews of this online collection. In late 2011, Highline Records signed the band and began work on the official release. In March, 2012, Sweet Lights released his debut single, "Endless Town" on Highline Records. The single was soon receiving airplay on BBC Radio 6 Music from notable disc jockeys like Bob Harris (radio), Lauren Laverne, and Gideon Coe. The "Endless Town" video debuted on the NME website shortly after.

The self-titled debut album was released in the UK on April 30, 2012, and in Europe on June 18, 2012. One of the first print reviews came from Uncut, awarding the album an 8/10 and describing it as a "luminous new identity". Additional positive marks came via Mojo Magazine, The Quietus blog, and others.

As was the case during The Capitol Years, Halperin regularly performed alongside Daniel Johnston, accompanying on guitar.

Sweet Lights released a collection of covers, Home Recordings 2000 - 2012, via Poor Poor Records on October 2, 2026.

== Discography ==
- 2012 - Sweet Lights (album)
- 2012 - "Endless Town" (single)
- 2012 - "Are We Gonna Work It Out" (single)
- 2026 - "True Love Will Find You in the End" (single)
- 2026 - Home Recordings 2000 - 2012 (album)
