= The Spinto Band =

American indie rock band

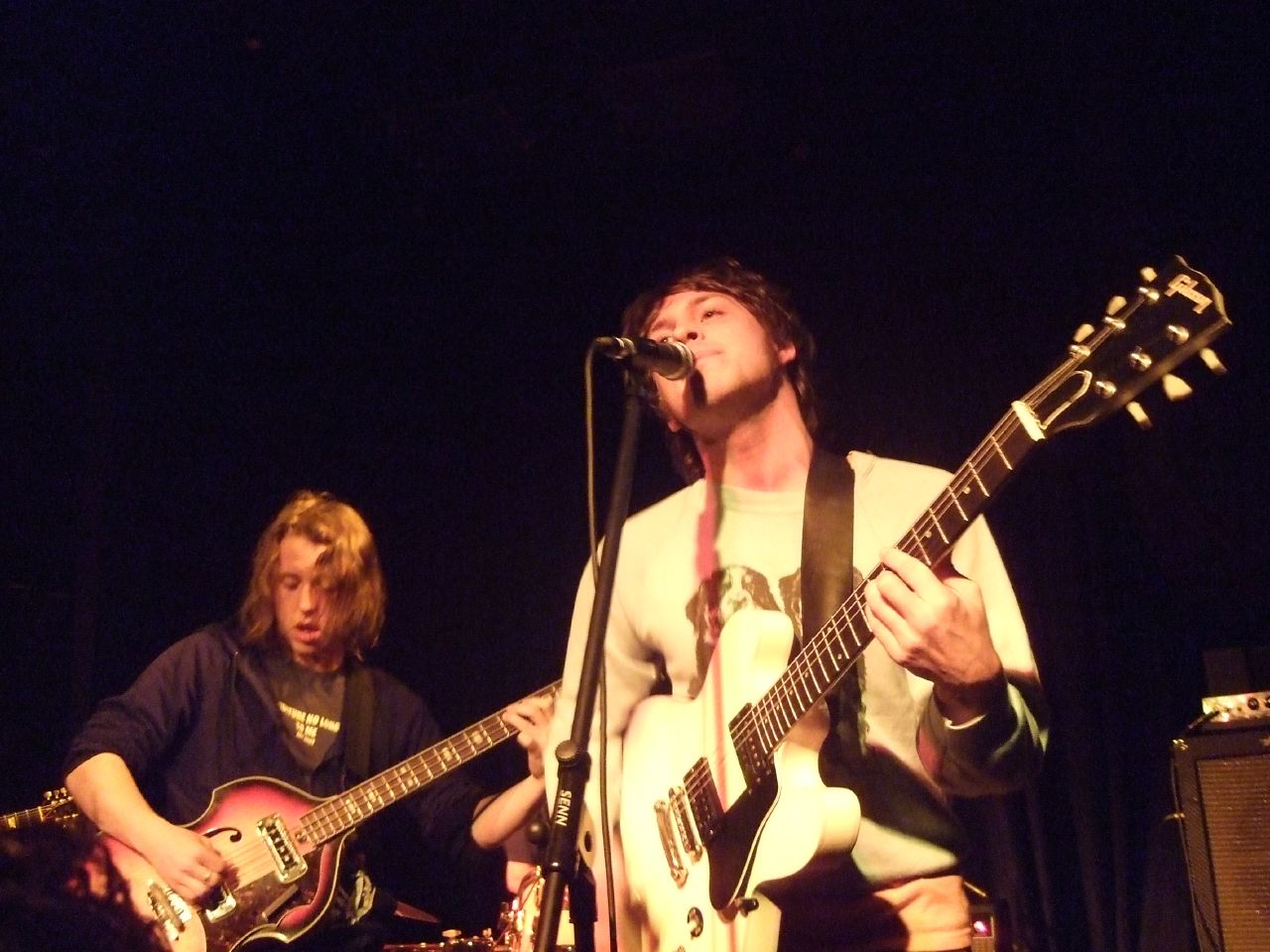
- The Spinto Band performing in 2006

Background information
- Origin: Wilmington, Delaware, United States
- Genres: Indie rock
- Years active: 1996–present
- Labels: Bar/None, Park the Van
- Members: Nick Krill; Thomas Hughes; Joey Hobson; Sam Hughes; Jeff Hobson
- Past members: Albert Birney; Jon Eaton
- Website: Bar/None Records

The Spinto Band is an American indie rock band from Wilmington, Delaware. Formed in 1996, the band comprises singer and guitarist Nick Krill, singer and bassist Thomas Hughes, drummer Jeffrey Hobson, keyboardist Sam Hughes, and guitarist Joey Hobson. They originally released music on their own label, Spintonic Recordings.

== Biography ==
The Spinto Band was originally formed as recording project by college students in Wilmington, Delaware in 1996. Frontman Nick Krill describes being inspired to form the band after stumbling upon unused song lyrics penned by his grandfather, Roy Spinto, on the back of Cracker Jack boxes. Describing the early years of the band: "Every other band we knew back then would play in their garage and do the live thing. They’d do a bunch of concerts, then go, ‘Oh man, we’ve gotta record now?’ But we just had this crap in the basement and all we’d do was record, so we had 20 90-minute tapes full of junk before we played our first show."

After several releases on the band's own Spintonic label, the band released its proper debut album, Nice and Nicely Done, on Bar/None Records in 2005. The song "Oh, Mandy" was released as a single. The song was also featured as the soundtrack to a TV commercial for Sears, the payment for which funded the band's first European tour.

In 2008, the band signed to Park the Van Records and released its second full-length album Moonwink. The group promoted the album with a series of humorous videos on YouTube. Preorders of the album were accompanied with a 7-inch single that coupled the band original "Franco Prussian" with a cover of The Motors 1978 UK hit "Airport."

The following year, the band released an EP titled Slim and Slender. The four-song release contained three original songs and a cover of Ary Barroso's 1939 South American hit "Brazil."

The band released their third album, Shy Pursuit, on May 1, 2012.

Their studio album "Cool Cocoon" was released February 5, 2013 in the United States. The opening track "Shake It Off" was released on SoundCloud in November.

A reissue of their album "Nice and Nicely Done" was released in June 2017. The release includes 13 additional rarities and bonus tracks from the recording sessions of the album.

== Band members ==
- Nick Krill (guitar/vocals)
- Thomas Hughes (bass guitar/vocals)
- Jeffrey Hobson (drums)
- Sam Hughes (keyboards)
- Joey Hobson (guitar/backing vocals)

=== Member projects ===
- Nick Krill toured with the band Clap Your Hands Say Yeah, playing guitar and keyboard. He is now a fulltime Mixer, Recording Engineer and Producer He has worked with The War on Drugs, Generationals, Clap Your Hands Say Yeah, The Dove and the Wolf, and Roar
- Thomas Hughes has a band and video shorts project called Carol Cleveland Sings
- Albert Birney plays in the Airkick Pigeon Band, as well as Teen Men, a new project with Nick Krill, Joey Hobson, and Catharine Maloney. Albert is also a filmmaker, in 2021 his film Strawberry Mansion premiered at the Sundance Film Festival.
- Jon Eaton, guitarist, until March 2011. In the words of Nick Krill, he "decided he didn't want to be a musician for the rest of his life and figured now is a good time to bow out."

== Discography ==
=== Albums ===
- Free Beer (1998), Spintonic Recordings - (as Free Beer)
- 30 Songs To Ease the Soul (1998), Spintonic Recordings - (as Free Beer)
- Our Mama, Jeffrey (1998), Spintonic Recordings - (as Free Beer)
- The Analog Chronicles (1998), Spintonic Recordings - (as Free Beer)
- Digital Summer (New Wave Techno Pop) (1999), Spintonic Recordings
- Roosevelt (2000), Spintonic Recordings
- Mersey & Reno (2001), Spintonic Recordings
- Nice and Nicely Done (2005), Bar/None Records
- Moonwink (2008), Park the Van Records
- Shy Pursuit (2012), Spintonic Recordings
- Biba! 1 Island, 879 Votes (Original Soundtrack) (2013), Spintonic Recordings
- Cool Cocoon (2013), Spintonic Recordings

=== Compilations ===
- Sam Raimi (2000) - Spintonic Recordings
- Strauss (2000) - Spintonic Recordings
- Straub (2000) - Spintonic Recordings
- Nashville Outtakes (2003) - Spintonic Recordings
- Happy Naught Seven from The Spinto Band (2007)
- You Be My Heart (2013)

=== EPs ===
- The Spinto Band (EP) (2003) - Sleepglue Records
- Good Answer (2004) - Spintonic Recordings
- Slim and Slender (2009) - Park the Van Records

=== Singles ===
Single	Year	Peak chart positions				Album
Single	Year	BEL (FL) Tip	SCO	UK	UK Indie	Album
"Oh Mandy"	2005	—	—	—	—	Nice and Nicely Done
"Mountains/Brown Boxes"	2005	—	—	—	—	Nice and Nicely Done
"Direct to Helmet"	2006	—	59	78	—	Nice and Nicely Done
"Did I Tell You"	2006	—	44	55	—	Nice and Nicely Done
"Oh Mandy" (re-issue)	2006	—	36	54	—	Nice and Nicely Done
"Summer Grof"	2008	—	—	— (Note: "Summer Grof" did not enter the UK Singles Chart, but peaked at number 83 on the UK Physical Singles Chart Top 100.)	8	Moonwink
"Franco Prussian"	2008	—	—	—	—	Moonwink
"Vivian, Don't"	2009	—	—	—	—	Moonwink
"Muesli"	2012	88	—	—	—	Shy Pursuit
"Shake It Off"	2012	—	—	—	—	Cool Cocoon
"—" denotes a recording that did not chart or was not released in that territory.
