= Strawberry Mansion (film) =

2021 American film by Albert Birney and Kentucker Audley

- Theatrical release poster
- Directed by: Albert Birney; Kentucker Audley
- Written by: Albert Birney; Kentucker Audley
- Produced by: Sarah Winshall; Taylor Shung; Emma Hannaway; Matisse Rifai
- Starring: Penny Fuller; Kentucker Audley; Grace Glowicki; Reed Birney; Linas Phillips; Constance Shulman
- Cinematography: Tyler Davis
- Edited by: Albert Birney; Kentucker Audley
- Music by: Dan Deacon
- Production companies: Ley Line Entertainment; Kaleidoscope Pictures; Salem Street Entertainment; UnLTD Productions; Cartuna
- Distributed by: Music Box Films (United States), ShutterSTOCK Liner Entertainment (United States), Alief (International)
- Release dates: January 29, 2021 (Sundance); February 18, 2022 (United States)
- Running time: 91 minutes
- Country: United States
- Language: English
- Box office: $97,526

Strawberry Mansion is a 2021 American surrealist science fantasy adventure film directed and written by Albert Birney and Kentucker Audley. It stars Penny Fuller, Kentucker Audley, Grace Glowicki, Reed Birney, Linas Phillips and Constance Shulman.

== Plot ==
In 2035, society's dreams are taxed by the government, which has mandated increased surveillance measures upon the general public. Dream Auditor James Preble travels to the countryside home of the elderly Arabella Isadora, an artist who lives alone with her pet tortoise Sugar Baby in the self-titled Strawberry Mansion. Arabella's dreams are stored on a vast library of VHS tapes, which Preble reviews to conduct an audit; at Bella's insistence, he stays in her guest room. In his dreams, he regularly spends his time in a pink room with Buddy, who presents him with commercial products; one such session is interrupted by a younger apparition of Bella. During his audit, Preble begins to fall in love with the younger Bella; he grows closer to her in the real world, and she reveals that the government allows advertisers to transmit ads to a person's dreams. She presents him with homemade headgear designed to hold them off; it successfully defends against Buddy. Sometime later, she dies peacefully and is discovered by Preble.

Bella's estranged son Peter Bloom arrives with his wife, Martha, and son, Brian, to handle Bella's affairs. Peter suggests to Preble that he is finished with his audit and may now leave. A suspicious Preble discovers Martha and Brian destroying the VHS tapes mid-audit and declares it a federal offense, angrily informing Peter that he will have to notify his superiors; Peter responds by later knocking him unconscious with a bowling pin. Preble vividly dreams of himself being chased around the house by exaggerated incarnations of the Blooms before he is rescued by the younger Bella. They escape to a small island, where they sustain and entertain themselves for a long time. Eventually, Bella reveals that Peter is the CEO of the country's largest advertisement corporation and that his knowledge of the dream-infiltrating advertisement scheme has placed him in danger. Various incarnations of Buddy appear and Preble wakes up; Peter knocks him out a second time and sets the room on fire; he and the family leave Preble to die.

Preble reawakens in his dream as the captain of a ship, helmed by two humanoid sailor rats, Richard and Marcus Rat. For the next seven years, they sail the seas in search of Bella, but the Rats eventually begin to question the mission's viability. As the fire in his room picks up, a giant Blue Demon attacks the ship at sea. Preble's surroundings dissolve around him and he dines with the normal-sized Blue Demon, who is keeping Bella in servitude. After the Demon goes to bed, Preble frees Bella and they escape back to the island. Bella warns him that he cannot stay with her for much longer, as he will soon die from the fire if he does not wake up. At her insistence, Preble turns into a caterpillar and spends the next several centuries traversing the earth, finally arriving at his pink room. He is confronted by a wrathful Buddy, but Bella arrives to help Preble overpower and ultimately vanquish him.

Preble and Bella are bid farewell by a sendoff party of all of the dream's characters; an apparition of Peter warmly greets and apologizes to both of them. They float off into space but find themselves disintegrating as Preble's mind continues to feel the fire's heat. Preble awakens and escapes the house, but reenters to retrieve the headgear, Sugar Baby, and a tape. Preble sorrowfully watches Strawberry Mansion burn down.

Upon returning home, Preble reminisces on the VHS tape, the contained dream of which shows Bella on a date with a mysterious grass man; Bella eventually brushes off the grass to reveal Preble underneath. The film ends with the two of them walking hand-in-hand to Strawberry Mansion.

== Cast ==
- Reed Birney as Peter Bloom
- Constance Shulman as Martha
- Kentucker Audley as James Preble
- Penny Fuller as Arabella Isadora
- Linas Phillips as Buddy
- Grace Glowicki as Young Bella
- Albert Birney as Frog Waiter / Blue Demon
- Ephraim Birney as Brian

== Release ==
The film premiered at the 2021 Sundance Film Festival on January 29, 2021 in the Next section. On June 21, 2021, Music Box Films acquired its US distribution rights and Alief acquired its international distribution rights.

== Reception ==
=== Box office ===
In the United States and Canada, the film earned $34,004 from twenty-seven theaters in its opening weekend. It made $11,055 in its second weekend, $3,577 in its third, $3,744 in its fourth, $1,309 in its fifth, $356 in its sixth, $2,486 in its seventh, and $552 in its eighth. The film returned to theaters in its eleventh weekend, earning $165 from one theater. It left theaters the following weekend, but once again returned to a single screen in its thirteenth weekend that added $705.

=== Critical response ===
On the review aggregator website Rotten Tomatoes, 88% of 76 critics' reviews are positive, with an average rating of 7.0/10. The website's critical consensus reads, "Strawberry Mansion's sci-fi premise provides cover for a film whose dream logic and surreal visuals are underscored by quietly poignant themes." Metacritic, which uses a weighted average, assigned the film a score of 75 out of 100, based on 22 critics, indicating "generally favorable" reviews.

In a review published by New York Times, Amy Nicholson referred to the film as "soulful sci-fi oddity".
