= Penny Lane (filmmaker) =

American independent filmmaker (born 1978)

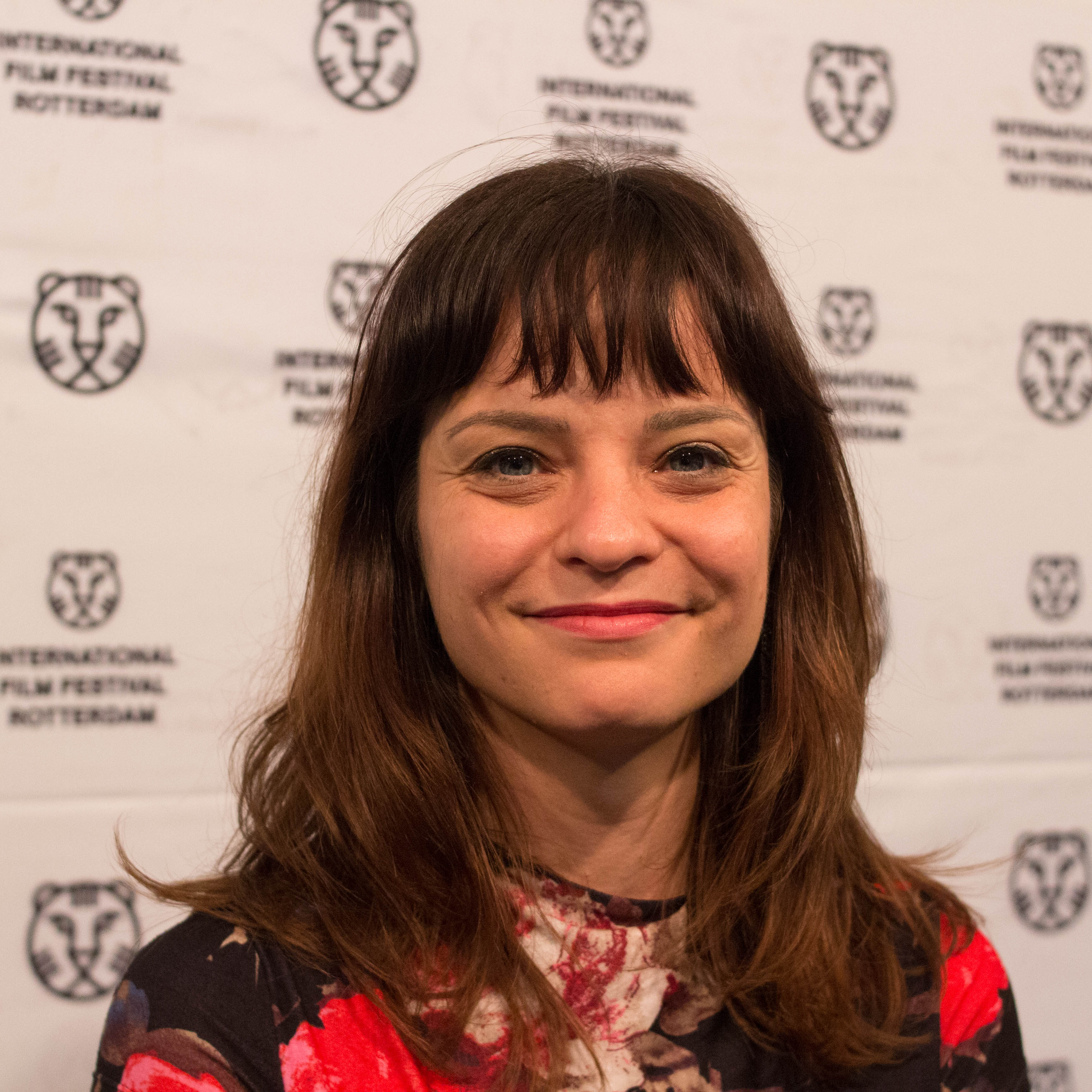
- Lane at International Film Festival Rotterdam 2018
- Born: March 6, 1978 (age 48); Lynn, Massachusetts, U.S.
- Occupation: Film director

Penny Lane (born March 6, 1978) is an American independent filmmaker, known for her documentary films. Her humor and unconventional approach to the documentary form, including the use of archival Super 8 footage and YouTube videos, have earned her critical acclaim.

Lane is a member of the Academy of Motion Picture Arts and Sciences.

== Life and career ==
Lane was born in Lynn, Massachusetts. She received an AB in American Culture and Media Studies at Vassar College in 2001 and an MFA in Integrated Electronic Arts at Rensselaer Polytechnic Institute in 2005. She has taught film, video and new media art at Bard College, Hampshire College, Williams College and Colgate University.

Lane became interested in filmmaking and video art while she was working at Children's Media Project, a nonprofit youth media center in Poughkeepsie, New York. Starting in 2002, she has made over a dozen experimental short films which span the worlds of video art and documentary film, including The Abortion Diaries, The Voyagers, Just Add Water and Normal Appearances. Many of her short films are collected and distributed by VTAPE.

In 2013, Lane released her first feature-length film Our Nixon. The all-archival documentary featuring the never before seen home movies of Nixon staffers premiered at the 42nd International Film Festival Rotterdam in 2013, had its North American premiere at SXSW, and was selected as the Closing Night Film at New Directors/New Films. It earned wide critical acclaim and numerous film festival awards at Seattle International Film Festival, Ann Arbor Film Festival, Nantucket Film Festival, and Traverse City Film Festival.

In 2016, the director's second feature-length film Nuts! a mostly-animated experimental documentary about con-man and quack, John Brinkley, world premiered at Sundance Film Festival, where it won the Special Jury Award for Editing.

Lane also released a companion project to Nuts! called Notes on Nuts!, a database of "footnotes" to the film in which she details over 300 instances of manipulation, tricky editing, and outright fabrications contained within the "mostly true" story in the film. Lane wrote that the website "takes the provocation of the film much further by engaging in a kind of radical honesty about all the tricks, manipulations and outright lies to be found in my film, with the idea that in doing so I could expand out from this one (admittedly really strange!) case study to instigate a whole new conversation: what would happen if documentary filmmakers started to regularly use footnotes?"

Lane returned to Sundance in 2019 to premiere her fourth feature-length documentary Hail Satan?, concerning the birth and rapid rise of The Satanic Temple.

In 2017, Lane was admitted into the Academy of Motion Picture Arts and Sciences.

In 2016, Lane discovered that the Tribeca Film Festival was planning to screen Vaxxed, an anti-vaccination documentary directed by Andrew Wakefield. She wrote a widely cited open letter to the festival, originally posted to Facebook and later reposted to Filmmaker Magazine, in which she asked the festival to remove the film from their lineup. In the letter she wrote, "the problem is not that Vaxxed is controversial, or even that it's deceptive. Honestly, I consider a large number of well-made, popular documentary films fairly deceptive. The problem is that it is dangerous misinformation being legitimized under the banner of your considerable prestige." After the ensuing controversy, Tribeca Film Festival eventually removed the film from its lineup.

== Critical acclaim ==
Critics have often noted Lane's use of humor and unique approach to the documentary form.

Filmmaker magazine named Lane one of "25 New Faces of Independent Film" in 2012. Ella Taylor of NPR described Lane as "one of our foremost chroniclers of bizarro Americana." Museum of the Moving Image chief curator David Schwartz organized her first major retrospective in 2018, writing "in the past few years, Penny Lane has quickly emerged as a major documentary filmmaker." Ann Hornaday wrote that Lane "might be documentary film's most compellingly cockamamie social historian," while Chris Plante wrote in The Verge in 2016, "Lane is the answer to a question more people should be asking: who's the great documentarian of this generation?"

== Feature films ==
=== Our Nixon ===
Brian Frye introduced Lane to the Super 8 home movies confiscated by the FBI during the Watergate investigation. The archival footage inspiring Lane and Frye became the basis of 2013 released nonfiction film Our Nixon, directed by Lane and co-produced by Frye.

The documentary depicts a unique portrait of Richard Nixon and his closest aides, chief of staff H.R. Haldeman, domestic affairs adviser John Ehrlichman, and special assistant Dwight Chapin. The film contains footage from 26 hours of Super 8 home movies filmed by Haldeman, Ehrlichman, and Chapin, as well as relevant news broadcasts and interviews. Among numerous films about the Nixon and Watergate era, Our Nixon stands out for its distinct, intimate perspective and the stylized all archival editing choice.

Our Nixon had its world premiere at the 42nd International Film Festival in Rotterdam and its North American premiere at 2013 South by Southwest. The film screened at multiple film festivals, including Ann Arbor Film Festival, where it won the Ken Burns Award for “Best of the Festival,” and Seattle International Film Festival, where it won the Best Documentary Award. Our Nixon was selected as the Closing Night Film at 42nd New Directors/New Films. On August 1, 2013, CNN broadcast the film, and Cinedigm handled the film's theatrical release.

The Wall Street Journal wrote that the "highly personal view of the Nixon years is, for obvious reasons, a sad and wrenching one - a film that is nonetheless filled with spirit, humor, and a bountiful sense of irony.” Amy Entelis, senior vice president for development for CNN Worldwide, praised the film for its “original material” and “unconventional” storytelling.

=== Nuts! ===
After encountering Charlatan, an authorized biography written by Pope Brock, in her local public library in 2009, Lane developed an interest in John Romulus Brinkley, a doctor who attempted to cure impotence via goat testicle transplantation in 1917. The experimental documentary Nuts! mainly consists of animated reenactments and narration voiced by both actors and Brinkley himself. “Brinkley’s story is not presented as the object of a neutral nonfiction gaze, but the opportunity for viewers to actively wrestle with the ethical and epistemological issues central to the narrative nonfiction form,” Lane wrote in the home page of Nuts!

Nuts! premiered at the 2016 Sundance Film Festival on Jan. 22, 2016, and won the Special Jury Award for Editing in the U.S. Documentary Competition of the festival. The documentary premiered theatrically on June 22, 2016, at Film Forum in New York.

Rolling Stone named Nuts! one of the 12 best movies they saw at Sundance 2016, saying “the fact that it’s all true didn’t stop Lane’s film from ending with the best twist of this year’s fest.”

=== The Pain of Others ===
Lane's third feature-length documentary The Pain of Others (2018), an all-archival documentary about the controversial illness known as Morgellons, world premiered at International Film Festival Rotterdam and was later screened at BAMcinemaFest, Maryland Film Festival and Sheffield Doc/Fest. The film is composed entirely of YouTube vlogs and does not answer the scientific question of the physiological causes of Morgellons—rather, it focuses on need for human proximity and unexplained suffering of the vloggers, as well as the specific formal and emotional qualities of 2010s era YouTube. Lane has described the film as both "YouTube body horror," and a "work of media archeology" which asks the questions, "When doctors send you away, to whom do you turn for help? When suffering has no explanation, what rushes to fill the void? How does false information spread on the internet? If a supportive and loving community forms around a shared delusion, can that be a good thing? What do you do in the face of someone else’s pain if you believe the pain stems from a delusion?" Lane was inspired to make the film by reading a 2013 essay in Harpers Magazine by Leslie Jamison describing the phenomenon.

=== Hail Satan? ===
An examination of the origins of The Satanic Temple and their brand of grassroots activism. The documentary premiered at the 2019 Sundance Film Festival and is distributed by Magnolia Pictures. Lane described the editing for the film occurred in approximately six months, "concurrent with the bulk of shooting."

=== Listening to Kenny G ===
Lane’s film on the musician Kenny G was released on HBO, as part of the ‘Music Box’ strand, and in theaters on December 2, 2021, and was one of Glenn Kenny’s Critic’s Picks in his December 2 review in the New York Times.

=== Wild Inside ===
Lane's film on Flaco a male Eurasian eagle-owl who escapes Central Park Zoo in 2023 and gained fame for his adventures was theatrically released in July 2026, by Sandbox Films. HBO Documentary Films co-produced the film with a broadcast to follow.

== Short films ==
=== The Abortion Diaries (2005) ===
The Abortion Diaries is a short documentary film released in 2005 which Lane completed as her MFA thesis project at iEAR Studios, Rensselaer Polytechnic Institute's electronic arts graduate program. The 30-minute documentary was made for approximately $3,000 and directed and edited by Lane. It features intimate interviews with 12 women who speak candidly about their experiences with abortion. Critics have written of the film, "[t]hough the concept is simple, it is also profoundly radical" and described it as "clear-eyed and surprisingly compelling".

Part of Lane's research process was to research the history of abortion stories in American popular media (film and television) and share it publicly on a widely consulted timeline.

Lane said she made the film to address a "generational gap in language" around abortion after having an abortion in her early 20s which she found "horrifically isolating" and feeling that her experiences were not represented in the popular media. "I felt guilty for not feeling guilty . . . I expected I would suffer a lot. Because I didn't, I felt like a monster." Lane looked "literally all over the Internet" for advice to help her handle her emotions, but found mainly pro-life literature disguised as unbiased pregnancy resources and pro-choice websites that failed to offer much beyond statistics. She made this film to correct the lack of representation and to "approach a divisive issue and go beyond bumper stickers."

The Abortion Diaries was a DIY film primarily self-distributed by the director herself. It became important organizing and discussion tool, screening at hundreds of colleges, churches, community centers, basements, and bars in every US state. It won several awards, including an Audience Award at New Orleans International Human Rights Film Festival, Best Student Documentary at Carolina Film/Video Festival, and Choice USA's “Spirit of Communication” Award.

=== The Voyagers (2010) ===
The Voyagers is an experimental documentary that tells the story of the NASA project to launch two spacecraft, each carrying golden phonograph records holding a wealth of human culture, into space in 1977. Space probes Voyager 1 and Voyager 2 pioneered research of the far reaches of the Solar System and continue to hurtle further into outer space today. In the process of putting together these time capsules of human experience, Carl Sagan and the project's creative director, Ann Druyan, fell in love. Their story resonated with Lane, who created a personal take on it for her own wedding, as a meditation on the nature of love in an uncertain universe.

Lane said the film is "a valentine to Carl Sagan and the way that he ... embodies the place where scientific skepticism meets child-like awe and wonder and joy and optimism." Brainpickings founder Maria Popova described the film as "a living testament to the creative capacity of remix culture" and critic Collin Souter described it as "a beautiful film, one that never resorts to over-the-top sentiment to make a point about love and the cosmos." Critic Andrew S. Allen described the film as "a profound story about love and the fearless ability of the human spirit to stand in awe of its vastness, to dream of its mysteries, and to catch a glimpse of its incomprehensible complexity, and, knowing what triumphs and heartache lie ahead, still boldly jump in headfirst."

The Voyagers won many awards, including Best Essay Film (2012 Short of the Week), Best Film (FLEX Film Festival 2011), Winner of the Hammer to Nail Short Film Contest (July 2012). Honorable Mention, Disposable Film Festival (March 2012), Honorable Mention, AFI FEST, Los Angeles (November 2011) and Best Experimental Film, New Orleans Film Festival, NOLA (October 2011).

== Awards and honors ==
- Creative Capital Award (2012)
- Sundance Film Festival, Special Jury Award for Editing (2016)
- Chicken & Egg Breakthrough Award (2017)
- Vanguard Award, San Francisco DocFest (2018)
- Wexner Center for the Arts Artist Award (2017)
- Sundance Institute Momentum Fellowship (2020)
