= Rotimi discography =

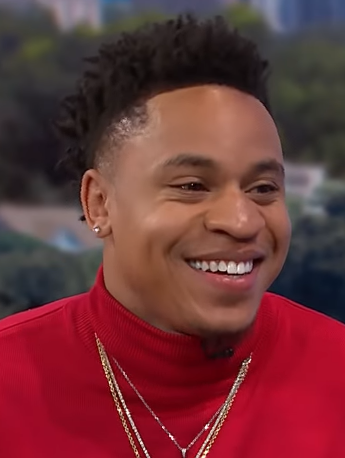
- Studio albums: 1
- EPs: 3
- Singles: 4
- Music videos: 5
- Mixtapes: 3

This is the discography of Rotimi, an American actor and singer, consists of one album, three extended plays (EPs), three mixtapes, four singles and five music videos.

== Studio albums ==
| Title | Album details |
|---|---|
| All or Nothing | Released: August 27, 2021; Label: FrontRo, Empire; Format: Digital download, streaming |
| In My Heart In My Veins | Released: November 18, 2024; Label: FrontRo, Empire; Format: CD, Digital download, streaming |

== EPs ==
| Title | Album details | Peak chart positions | |
| Title | Album details | US Indie | US Heat |
|---|---|---|---|
| Jeep Music Vol. 1 | Released: August 4, 2017; Label: G-Unit, Empire; Format: CD, digital download, streaming | 37 | 16 |
| Walk with Me | Released: May 24, 2019; Label: FrontRo, Empire; Format: Digital download, streaming | 41 | 10 |
| The Beauty of Becoming | Released: December 13, 2019; Label: FrontRo, Empire; Format: Digital download, streaming | — | — |
"—" denotes a recording that did not chart or was not released in that territory.

== Mixtapes ==
| Title | Album details |
|---|---|
| The Resume | Released: March 29, 2011; Format: Digital download |
| While You Wait | Released: October 25, 2011; Format: Digital download |
| Royal Wednesday | Released: November 11, 2015; Format: Digital download |
| Summer Bangerz | Released: June 23, 2016; Format: Digital download |

== Singles ==
=== As lead artist ===
List of singles as lead artist, with selected chart positions, showing year released and album name
| Title | Year | Peak chart positions | | | | | Certifications | Album |
| Title | Year | US | US Main. R&B/HH | US R&B/HH Airplay | US R&B | US Rhy. | Certifications | Album |
|---|---|---|---|---|---|---|---|---|
| "Lotto" (featuring 50 Cent) | 2015 | 86 | 40 | — | — | — | | Royal Wednesday |
| "Nobody" (featuring 50 Cent and T.I.) | 2017 | — | — | — | — | — | | Jeep Music Vol. 1 |
| "Want More" (featuring Kranium) | 2017 | — | — | — | — | — | | Jeep Music Vol. 1 |
| "Love Riddim" | 2019 | — | 21 | 31 | — | — | | Walk With Me |
| "In My Bed" (featuring Wale) | 2019 | — (Note: "In My Bed" did not enter the Billboard Hot 100, but peaked at number 20 on the Bubbling Under Hot 100 chart.) | 16 | 21 | 12 | 15 | RIAA: Gold | The Beauty of Becoming |
| "Love Somebody" | 2020 | — | — | — | — | — | | All or Nothing |
| "Hey Boy" (with Precious) | 2021 | — | — | — | — | — | | TBA |
| "Decide" | 2021 | — | — | — | — | — | | All or Nothing |
| "What To Do" | 2021 | — | 37 | 47 | — | — | | All or Nothing |
| "Throwback" (featuring Jnr Choi & Blackway) | 2022 | — | — | — | — | — | | non-album single |
| "Make You Say" (with Nektunez) | 2022 | — | — | — | — | — | | In My Heart In My Veins |
| "Bestie" | 2023 | — | — | — | — | — | | In My Heart In My Veins |
| "Sade" (featuring Mayorkun & Nasty C) | 2024 | — | — | — | — | — | | non-album single |
| "Birthday" | 2024 | — | — | — | — | — | | In My Heart In My Veins |
| "Dear Imani" | 2024 | — | — | — | — | — | | In My Heart In My Veins |
| "ILMSY (MOVES)" | 2024 | — | — | — | — | — | | In My Heart In My Veins |
| "Time Ain't On Our Side" | 2024 | — | — | — | — | — | | In My Heart In My Veins |
"—" denotes a title that did not chart, or was not released in that territory.

== Guest appearances ==
List of non-single guest appearances, with other performing artists, showing year released and album name
| Title | Year | Other artist(s) | Album |
|---|---|---|---|
| "Only You" | 2012 | Banky W., Shaydee | Empire Mates State of Mind |
| "Say" | 2013 | Banky W., Sammy, Shaydee | R&BW |
| "MVP" | 2016 | Bianca Bonnie | —N/a |
| "Thank God" | 2017 | Wale | Shine |
| "Lavish" | 2017 | Skales | The Never Say Never Guy |
| "Best Thing" | 2023 | Lecrae | Church Clothes 4: Dry Clean Only |
| "I Believe" | 2024 | Don Crucifixto | Believe in Forever |

== Music videos ==
List of music videos
| Year | Title | Director(s) |
|---|---|---|
| 2009 | "Beautiful Music" | Ryan Gallagher |
| 2010 | "Forever" | Da Visionaryz |
| 2011 | "Hello" (featuring Mickey Factz) | Berman Fenelus |
| 2012 | "She Know It (Snippet)" | Fenomanal Studios |
| 2013 | "Only Human" | Chris Amos & Travis LaBella |
| 2015 | "Lotto " (featuring 50 Cent) | Eif Rivera |
| 2015 | "Situation" | Corentin Villemeur & Timo Albert |
| 2015 | "Potential" | Kerstyn Dioulo |
| 2016 | "Doing It" | Joell Peralta |
| 2016 | "Movin On" | Rotimi & Moshines |
| 2016 | "Paradise" | Shane Adams |

List of featured music videos
| Year | Title | Director(s) |
|---|---|---|
| 2011 | "Without You" (B. Madison) | Jay Rodriguez & Rock Davis |
