= Mircea (disambiguation) =

Mircea is a given name. It may also refer to:

- NMS Mircea (1882), the second ship of the Romanian Navy's Black Sea Fleet, out of service in 1939
- Mircea (ship), built in 1938 as a training vessel for the Romanian Navy, still in service
- Mircea (film), a 1989 Romanian film
- Mircea, a tributary of the Ialomița in Dâmbovița County, Romania
- Mircea Chivu Stadium, a football (soccer) stadium in Reșița, Romania
- Mircea Vodă (disambiguation), several settlements in Romania

== See also ==
- Marcea, a village in Ionești, Vâlcea, Romania
- Mercea, a surname
