= Alex Anfanger =

American television writer, actor, and producer

- Occupations: Actor; Writer
- Known for: Big Time in Hollywood, FL; Next Time on Lonny
- Partner: Anna Konkle
- Children: 1

Alex Anfanger (born September 14, 1985, in Malibu, California) is an American television writer, actor, and producer known for his roles in projects such as Burning Love, Cake, and Big Time in Hollywood, FL.

Anfanger is engaged to actress Anna Konkle and they have one child together.

== Filmography ==
=== Film ===
Year	Title	Role	Notes
2005	Kids in America	Lawrence Reitzer	
2012	3 Days of Normal	Amos	
2012	The Kitchen	Edwin	
2013	The Secret Life of Walter Mitty	Ted's Toner Box Associate	
2014	The Sound and the Shadow	Kyle	
2019	Plus One	Derrick	

=== Television ===
Year	Title	Role	Notes
2011–2014	Next Time on Lonny	Lonny	16 episodes
2013	Compulsive Love	Aaron	8 episodes
2013	Burning Love	Noah	8 episodes
2014	TripTank	Wally Trucker	Episode: "Game Over"
2015	Big Time in Hollywood, FL	Jack	10 episodes; also writer and executive producer
2015	5-Second Films	Aaron	Episode: "Roommate Mix Up"
2016	HelLA	Alex	Episode: "Getting High in Hollywood"
2020	Cake	Shark Lords	10 episodes
