= Ishai Setton =

American film director

- Born: Houston, Texas, U.S.
- Occupation(s): Director, editor, producer
- Years active: 2001–present

Ishai Setton is an American film director, editor and producer. After graduating from the Tisch School of the Arts in New York City in 2002, he has worked both in cinema and television.

== Career ==
Setton made his feature-length directorial debut in 2006 with The Big Bad Swim, an independent comedy-drama that focuses on a group of people, each of whom is afraid of the water, that join an adult swim class. The Big Bad Swim premiered at the Tribeca Film Festival on April 26, 2006. It received a generally positive response and won multiple awards from several film festivals.

In 2012, Setton directed 3 Days of Normal, starring Mircea Monroe and Jace Mclean. The same year he directed The Kitchen, an independent comedy-drama written by Jim Beggarly and starring Laura Prepon, Bryan Greenberg, and Dreama Walker. It premiered on August 14, 2012 at the Gen Art Film Festival.

As an editor, Setton edited Artifact (2012), a documentary film directed by Jared Leto. He also has worked as an editor on several American television series: Glee, Scream Queens, Star and Empire.
