= Mercea =

Mercea is a surname. Notable people with the surname include:

- Andrei Mercea (1925–2002), Romanian footballer
- Victor Mercea (1924–1987), Romanian nuclear physicist

== See also ==
- Mircea (disambiguation)
