= 3 Days of Normal =

- Film poster
- Directed by: Ishai Setton
- Written by: Jace McLean; Jared Parsons
- Produced by: Jared Parsons
- Starring: Mircea Monroe; Jace McLean; Pawel Szajda; Richard Riehle; Lin Shaye; Ajay Naidu; Alex Anfanger
- Cinematography: Josh Silfen
- Edited by: Paul Frank; Joe Leonard
- Music by: Chad Kelly
- Production company: From Out of The Wood Work production
- Release date: 2 June 2012
- Running time: 82 minutes
- Country: United States
- Language: English

3 Days of Normal is a 2012 American independent film produced by Jared Parsons and Mircea Monroe. The film is directed by Ishai Setton and stars Jace McLean and Mircea Monroe. The story is about a police officer and a Hollywood actress in the small town of Washington, New Hampshire, United States.

== Plot ==
Bill Morgan (Jace McLean) is a small town sheriff whose self-imposed rules have kept him in Washington, New Hampshire, for his entire life. A stickler for perfection and abiding by the rules, Bill's singular ambition is to keep order for himself and those around him. Everything changes when It-Girl movie starlet, Nikki Gold (Mircea Monroe), who has escaped the bright lights and paparazzi of New York City, if only for a brief while, is found passed out in her rental car by none other than Bill Morgan—who has absolutely no idea who she is. In an effort to avoid the chaos of yet another publicity scandal, Nikki embraces the anonymity for a few blissful days of normalcy.

Shot on location in New Hampshire against a picturesque, fall-colored backdrop, 3 Days of Normal follows Bill and Nikki during three magical days as they find themselves relying on one another to face their own personal challenges. The film features a supporting cast including Ajay Naidu (Gods Behaving Badly) as the intrusive entertainment journalist, Alex Anfanger (The Secret Life of Walter Mitty) as the meddling kid out to make a quick buck, Lin Shaye (There's Something About Mary) as Bill's aunt and Richard Riehle (Bridesmaids) as Bill's uncle and the town's chief of police.

== Cast ==
- Mircea Monroe - Nikki Gold
- Jace McLean - Bill Morgan (sheriff)
- Richard Riehle - Chief Dale Nickens
- Lin Shaye - May Chief's wife
- Ajay Naidu - Vik Donowitz (paparazzi)
- Alex Anfanger - Amos (Kid)
- Pawel Szajda - Trent Callender
- Joanne Baron - Liz
- Joel Spence - Colin Wade
- Meredith Handerhan - Charlie
- Leigh McLean - Mrs. Greer
- Gregory Konow - Russian Cabbie
- Erika Woods
- William Bornkessel
- Stacey Forbes Iwanicki - Prison Officer Worker
