= Big Time in Hollywood, FL =

American sitcom

- Genre: Dark comedy
- Created by: Alex Anfanger; Dan Schimpf
- Starring: Alex Anfanger; Lenny Jacobson; Jon Bass; Kathy Baker; Stephen Tobolowsky
- Opening theme: "Rainbow" by Bobby Jealousy
- Country of origin: United States
- Original language: English
- No. of seasons: 1
- No. of episodes: 10

Production
- Executive producers: Alex Anfanger; Dan Schimpf; Ben Stiller; Debbie Liebling; Stuart Cornfeld; Mike Rosenstein; Lee Kernis; Brian Stern
- Camera setup: Single
- Running time: 22 minutes
- Production companies: Red Hour Productions; Brillstein Entertainment Partners

Original release
- Network: Comedy Central
- Release: March 25 – May 27, 2015

Big Time in Hollywood, FL is an American sitcom created and written by Alex Anfanger and Dan Schimpf.

== Production ==
In December 2014, it was announced a 10-episode first season was ordered by the American cable television network Comedy Central, which would premiere on March 25, 2015.

Comedy Central made no official cancellation statement; however, on September 25, 2015, series star Lenny Jacobson confirmed that there would not be a second season.

== Cast ==
- Alex Anfanger as Jack Dolfe, a delusional self-proclaimed filmmaker
- Lenny Jacobson as Ben Dolfe, Jack's brother
- Jon Bass as Del Plimpton, Jack and Ben's childlike friend
- Kathy Baker as Diana Dolfe, Jack and Ben's mother
- Stephen Tobolowsky as Alan Dolfe, Jack and Ben's father

=== Recurring guests ===
- Cuba Gooding Jr. as himself
- Keith David as Agent Everett Malloy
- Betsy Sodaro as Darla
- Paz Vega as Isabella Delgado
- Michael Madsen as Harvey Scoles
- Marcus Giamatti as Detective Jim Zdorkin
- Jane Kaczmarek as Dr. Linda Moore
- Lee Schall as Ted
- Crispin Alapag as Marco Chavez

== Episodes ==
No.	Title	Directed by	Written by	Original release date	US viewers (millions)
1	"Severance"	Dan Schimpf	Alex Anfanger & Dan Schimpf	March 9, 2015 (online); March 25, 2015 (Comedy Central)	0.570
Jack and Ben are told by Diana and Alan that they have two weeks to move out and find jobs. Jack and Ben decide to try to scam them into paying them $20,000 as "severance", which would help fund their movies. Ben decides to pretend to have a drug problem and owe money to a dangerous drug dealer. Guest starring Ben Stiller as Jimmy Staats
2	"Intervention"	Dan Schimpf	Jim Brandon & Brian Singleton	April 1, 2015	0.392
Jack, Ben and their Del have attracted the police's attention, so Diana and Alan create a drug-intervention to give Ben an excuse to leave the country.
3	"Rehabilitation"	Dan Schimpf	Romanski	April 8, 2015	0.439
While Ben is in rehab, Jack is living in a new apartment, meanwhile Diana hires a private investigator to keep an eye on Del.
4	"To Catch a Paparazzi"	Rob Schrab	Jordan Pope-Roush	April 15, 2015	0.341
Jack and Ben meet Cuba Gooding Jr. in rehab and plot to recruit him in their filmmaking projects, but Diana's private investigator Harvey Scoles is watching from the shadows. Guest starring Cuba Gooding Jr. as himself
5	"A Night In"	Rob Schrab	Ben Seccombe	April 22, 2015	0.315
Alan and Diana are on a date, but Jack and Ben find themselves in trouble and facing challenges they didn't expect.
6	"Separate But Equal"	Dan Schimpf	Romanski	April 29, 2015	0.355
While Jack continues with his filmmaking, Ben has gone home to patch his life back together, and Malloy and Zdorkin find Scoles is involved in the same case they are.
7	"What Dreams May Come"	Dan Schimpf	Jim Brandon & Brian Singleton	May 6, 2015	0.223
Cuba Gooding Jr. returns with an offer for Ben and Jack, at the same time Diana and Alan are taking couples therapy while Malloy spies on the Dolfe family.
8	"Monkey Largo"	Dan Schimpf	Ben Seccombe	May 13, 2015	0.300
Ben and Jack begin work on their film, but the set has suddenly become a deathtrap for Del.
9	"The Hand that Feeds"	Dan Schimpf	Jordan Pope-Roush	May 20, 2015	0.288
Malloy is hunting the boys, and Cuba Gooding Jr. recruits his pal Jason Alexander into the mix. Guest starring Jason Alexander as himself
10	"Art Imitates Death"	Dan Schimpf	Alex Anfanger & Dan Schimpf	May 27, 2015	0.280
The tensions reaches breaking point, and things begin to clash on Jack and Ben's film set.

== Reception ==
Big Time in Hollywood, FL received generally positive reviews from critics. On Rotten Tomatoes, the first season has a rating of 73%, based on 11 reviews, with an average rating of 6.8/10. The site's critical consensus reads, "An absorbing narrative and talented cast help Big Time in Hollywood, FL balance its occasionally obnoxious antics with witty slapstick." On Metacritic, the season has a score of 68 out of 100, based on 10 critics, indicating "generally favorable reviews".
