= Lenny Jacobson =

American actor

- Born: June 11, 1974 (age 52); Holyoke, Massachusetts
- Occupation: Actor
- Years active: 2007–present
- Notable work: Big Time in Hollywood, FL; Nurse Jackie
- Children: 1

Lenny Jacobson (born June 11, 1974) is an American actor best known for his role as Ben in the Comedy Central series Big Time in Hollywood Florida and as Wayne Cobb in the Apple TV+ science fiction drama series For All Mankind.

== Life and career ==
Born and raised in Holyoke, Massachusetts, Jacobson attended Blessed Sacrament School and Holyoke Catholic High School. He went on to spend a year at Roger Williams University in Bristol, RI, where he was a member of the men's basketball team.

He moved to Los Angeles in 2001 to pursue a career in acting and got his start booking various commercials, including Budweiser and Castrol.

In 2009, Jacobson earned a small role in the pilot for the Showtime series Nurse Jackie, which later became a major recurring role, appearing in 25 episodes over the next 4 seasons. During this time, Jacobson also worked on several other series including NCIS, Southland, Law & Order: LA, and Rizzoli & Isles.

His career continued with roles on TV's CSI, Shameless and Modern Family, and in feature films like Celeste & Jesse Forever and the 2013 Steve Jobs biopic Jobs, starring Ashton Kutcher, Josh Gad, and J. K. Simmons.

Following his final season on Nurse Jackie, Jacobson shared with his cast-mates a Screen Actors Guild Award nomination for Outstanding Performance by an Ensemble in a Comedy Series, his first major nomination.

In August 2013, Deadline Hollywood announced that Jacobson would be starring in Comedy Central pilot Big Time in Hollywood, FL, which was then ordered to series in January 2014. The series only lasted ten episodes and was confirmed by Jacobson himself that there would not be another season.

In 2016, Jacobson portrayed a role in Blumhouse Productions' The Veil, alongside Jessica Alba and Thomas Jane.

Since 2019, Jacobson has portrayed Wayne Cobb, husband of NASA Astronaut Molly Cobb, in the Apple TV+ original science fiction space drama series For All Mankind.

== Filmography ==
=== Film ===
Year	Title	Role	Director
2012	Celeste & Jesse Forever	Peter Pan	Lee Toland Krieger
2013	Jobs	Burrell Smith	Joshua Michael Stern
2016	The Veil	Ed	Phil Joanou
2018	Bumblebee	Roy	Travis Knight

=== Television ===
Year	Title	Role	Notes
2007	Entourage	Rub & Tug Customer #2	1 episode
2007	Las Vegas	Pickpocket	1 episode
2007	October Road	Hippy Bob	1 episode
2009-2012	Nurse Jackie	Lenny	25 episodes
2009	Mayne Street	Scott	1 episode
2010	Southland	Borders Guy	1 episode
2011	Law & Order: LA	Ray	1 episode
2011	NCIS	Security Guard	1 episode
2012	Rizzoli & Isles	Rick Jaffe	1 episode
2013	CSI	Denny Jones	1 episode
2013	The New Normal	Ben	1 episode
2013	Modern Family	Tony	1 episode
2013	Jessie	Ted the Delivery Guy	1 episode
2014	The Crazy Ones	Jerome	1 episode
2014	Next Time on Lonny	Terrance	1 episode
2014	Bad Teacher	Larry	2 episodes
2014	Halt and Catch Fire	Donnie Manning	1 episode
2015	Shameless	Norbert	1 episode
2015	Big Time in Hollywood, FL	Ben	10 episodes
2016	Frequency	Gordo	Main role; 13 episodes
2016	Grimm	Oliver Dunbar	1 episode
2019–2022	For All Mankind	Wayne Cobb	8 episodes
2022	Peacemaker	Evan Calcaterra	2 episodes
