= Mircea Vodă =

Mircea Vodă may refer to several places in Romania:

- Mircea Vodă, Brăila, a commune in Brăila County
- Mircea Vodă, Constanța, a commune in Constanța County
- Mircea Vodă, a village in Sălcioara Commune, Dâmbovița County
- Mircea Vodă, a village in Cerna Commune, Tulcea County
