= Mircea =

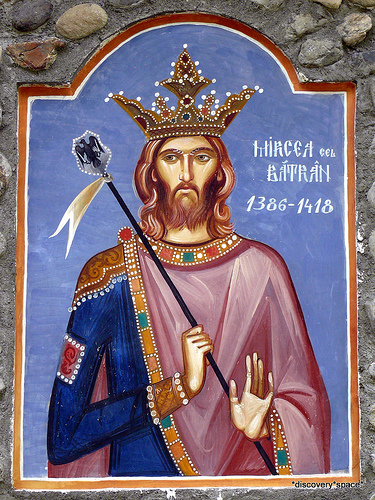
- Mircea the Elder, prince of Wallachia
- Pronunciation: Romanian: [ˈmirtʃe̯a]
- Gender: Masculine
- Language: Romanian

Origin
- Origin: Slavic
- Meaning: 'peace'

Other names
- Related names: Mirče, Miroslav

Mircea is a Romanian masculine given name, a form of the South Slavic name Mirče (Мирче) that derives from the Slavic word mir, meaning 'peace'. It may refer to:

== People ==
=== Princes of Wallachia ===
- Mircea I of Wallachia (1355–1418), also known as Mircea the Elder
- Mircea II of Wallachia (1428–1447), grandson of Mircea I
- Mircea III Dracul (died 1534), Voivode (Prince) of Wallachia in 1510
- Mircea the Shepherd (died 1559), son of Radu cel Mare
- Alexander II Mircea (1529–1577), Voivode of Wallachia from 1568 to 1574 and 1574 to 1577
- Prince Mircea of Romania (1913–1916)

=== Others ===
- Mircea Abrudean, Romanian politician
- Mircea Albulescu, professional name of Iorgu Constantin Albulescu (1934–2016), Romanian actor, university professor, journalist, poet and writer
- Mircea Badea (born 1974), Romanian political satirist, television host, media critic, radio personality and occasional actor
- Mircea Baniciu (born 1949), Romanian musician, singer and songwriter
- Mircea Brînzea (born 1986), Romanian aerobic gymnast
- Mircea Cărtărescu (born 1956), Romanian poet, novelist, literary critic and essayist
- Mircea Chistruga (1948–2025), Moldovan film director
- Mircea Ciumara (1943–2012), Romanian politician and former cabinet minister
- Mircea Coșea (1942–2025), Romanian politician, economist, diplomat, essayist, journalist and academic
- Mircea Costache II (1940–2016), Romanian handball player and coach
- Mircea Crișan (1924–2013), Romanian comedian and comedic actor
- Mircea Damian (1899–1948), Romanian writer and journalist
- Mircea Daneliuc (born 1943), Romanian film director, screenwriter and actor
- Mircea David (1914–1993), Romanian football goalkeeper
- Mircea Demetriade (1861–1914), Romanian poet, playwright and actor
- Mircea Diaconu (1949–2024), Romanian actor, writer, and politician
- Mircea Dinescu (born 1950), Romanian poet, journalist and editor
- Mircea Druc (born 1949), Moldovan and Romanian politician, Prime Minister of Moldova between 1990 and 1991
- Mircea Drăgan (1932–2017), Romanian film director
- Mircea Dușa (1955–2022), Romanian economist and politician
- Mircea Eliade (1907–1986), Romanian historian of religion, fiction writer, philosopher and professor
- Mircea Florian (philosopher) (1888–1960), Romanian philosopher and translator
- Mircea Florian (musician) (born 1949), Romanian musician, multimedia artist and computer scientist
- Mircea Frățică (born 1957), Romanian retired judoka
- Mircea Fulger (born 1959), Romanian retired boxer
- Mircea Geoană (born 1958), Romanian politician
- Mircea Gesticone (1902–1961), Romanian novelist and poet
- Mircea Grosaru (1952–2014), Romanian politician
- Mircea Ionescu-Quintus (1917–2017), Romanian politician and Minister of Justice from 1991 to 1992
- Mircea Irimescu (born 1959), Romanian retired footballer
- Mircea Lucescu (1945–2026), Romanian football player and manager
- Mircea Monroe (born 1982), American model and actress
- Mircea Mustață (born 1971), Romanian mathematician
- Mircea Nedelciu (1950–1999), Romanian short-story writer, novelist, essayist and literary critic
- Mircea Oltean (born 1982), Romanian former football goalkeeper
- Mircea Oprea (born 1980), Romanian former footballer
- Mircea Păcurariu (1932–2021), Romanian theologian, historian and Romanian Orthodox priest
- Mircea Pârligras (born 1980), Romanian chess Grandmaster
- Mircea Puta (1950–2007), Romanian mathematician
- Mircea Răceanu (born 1935), Romanian diplomat
- Mircea Rednic (born 1962), Romanian football manager and former player
- Mircea Romașcanu (born 1953), Romanian former cyclist
- Mircea Rus (born 1978), Romanian former footballer
- Mircea Sasu (1939–1983), Romanian footballer
- Mircea Șimon (born 1954), Romanian heavyweight boxer
- Mircea Snegur (1940–2023), first President of Moldova (1990–1997), Chairman of the Presidium of the Supreme Soviet (1989–1990) and Chairman of the Supreme Soviet in 1990
- Mircea Steriade (1924–2006), Romanian-born Canadian researcher in systems neuroscience
- Mircea Streinul (1910–1945), Austro-Hungarian-born Romanian prose writer and poet
- Mircea Tiberian (1955–2025), Romanian jazz pianist and composer
- Mircea Veroiu (1941–1997), Romanian film director and screenwriter
- Mircea Voicu (born 1980), Romanian former footballer
- Mircea Vulcănescu (1904–1952), Romanian philosopher, economist, ethics teacher and sociologist arrested in 1946 and convicted under the Communist regime.
- Mircea Zamfir (born 1985), Romanian aerobic gymnast

== Sources ==
- Felecan, Oliviu (2012). Name and Naming: Synchronic and Diachronic Perspectives. Cambridge Scholars Publishing. pp. 407–. ISBN 978-1-4438-3807-8.
