= Mircea Monroe =

American actress

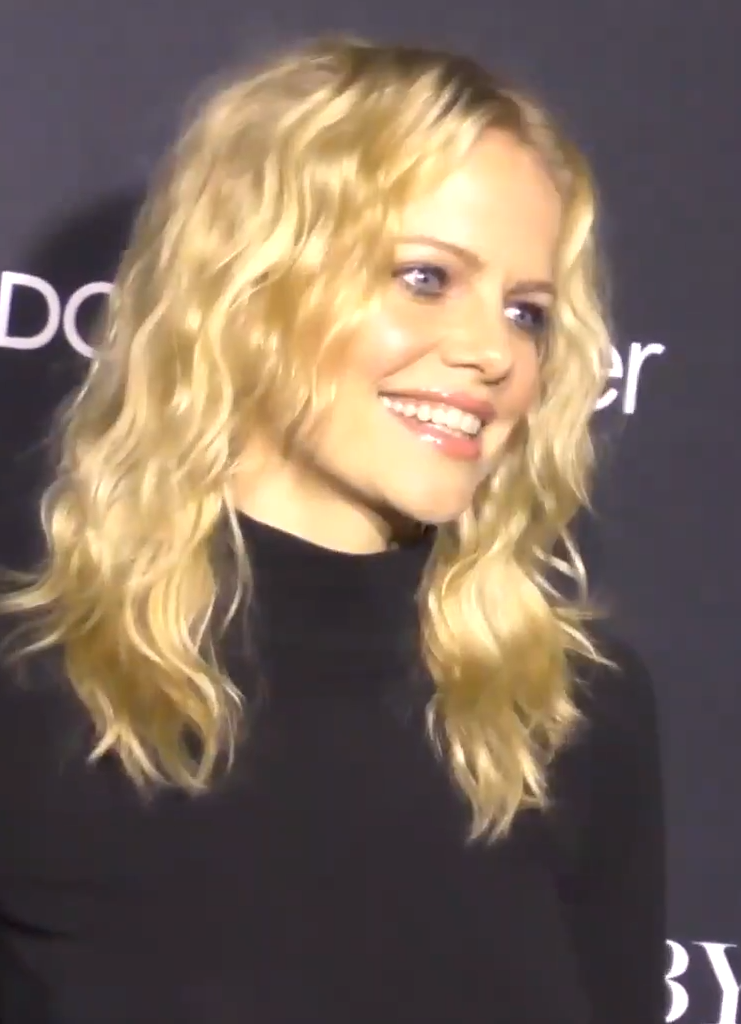
- Monroe in 2016
- Born: St. Louis, Missouri, U.S.
- Occupation: Actress
- Years active: 2004–present
- Partner: Stephen Merchant (2018–present)

Mircea Monroe is an American actress. She had roles on the TV series Episodes as Morning Randolph (2011–2017), Hart of Dixie as Tansy Truitt (2011–2015), Impastor as Alexa Cummings (2015–2016) and Sing It! as Stacey Needles (2016). She has also appeared in movies including Cellular (2004), House of the Dead 2 (2005), Just Friends (2005), The Change-Up (2011) and Magic Mike (2012).

Mircea received a Certificate in Creative Writing from the University of Cambridge in 2021.

== Career ==
Mircea Monroe is best known for her role as “Morning” in Showtime’s critically acclaimed comedy Episodes, created by David Crane and Jeffrey Klarik and starring opposite Matt LeBlanc for five seasons. She also starred as Tansy Truitt on The CW’s Hart of Dixie and was a series regular on TV Land’s Impastor opposite Michael Rosenbaum.

In 2023, Monroe appeared in a recurring role on ABC’s The Rookie with Nathan Fillion, CBS’s Dinner With The Parents and the BBC/Amazon series The Outlaws.

Her feature film credits include The Change-Up opposite Ryan Reynolds, Magic Mike with Channing Tatum, directed by Steven Soderbergh and Book Club opposite Jane Fonda, Diane Keaton, and Andy Garcia.

Across her career, Monroe has starred in numerous network pilots and appeared in a wide range of television and film projects, excelling in both comedic roles (on shows including Scrubs and How I Met Your Mother) as well as dramatic performances (Sons of Anarchy and Madso's War, directed by Walter Hill).

== Personal life ==
Monroe was born in St. Louis, Missouri. Her first name Mircea is a traditionally male given name in Romania. She says her father chose the name to honor his favorite professor, Mircea Eliade, with whom he studied History of the Religions at the University of Chicago.

Since 2018, Monroe has been in a relationship with English comedian and actor Stephen Merchant. They live in a home in the Nichols Canyon area of Los Angeles.

== Filmography ==
=== Film ===
Year	Title	Role	Notes
2004	Cellular	Chloe's Friend	
2005	All Souls Day	Lilly White	
2005	Pterodactyl	Angie Lem	
2005	House of the Dead 2	Sarah Curtis	
2005	Just Friends	Hooker	Uncredited
2006	The Contract	Park Reporter	
2006	The Ultimate Gift	Caitlin	
2007	Itty Bitty Titty Committee	Justine	
2007	Borderland	Nancy	
2007	One Long Night	Mindy	
2008	Screw Cupid	Swain Holly	
2008	Stone & Ed	Mara	
2008	Fast Girl	Alex Johnstone	
2008	Burying the Ex	Evelyn	Original short film
2008	Your Name Here	Black Turtleneck Girl	
2008	No Man's Land: The Rise of Reeker	Maya	
2009	Finding Bliss	Sindi	
2009	Into the Blue 2: The Reef	Kimi Milligan	
2009	The Black Waters of Echo's Pond	Veronique	
2009	Tekken	Kara	
2010	Growth	Jamie Ackerman	
2010	The 41-Year-Old Virgin Who Knocked Up Sarah Marshall and Felt Superbad About It	Sarah	
2010	Exhibit B-5	Sheri	Short film
2010	Hard Breakers	Sherri Sutter	
2010	Madso's War	Colleen	TV film
2011	American Animal	Blonde Angela	
2011	The Change-Up	Tatiana	
2011	Boy Toy	Norah	
2011	Lone Star Trixie	Amazonian Blonde	Short film
2011	Houndz from Hell	Bethesda	
2012	Bloodwork	Stacey	
2012	3 Days of Normal	Nikki Gold	
2012	Magic Mike	Mercedes - Ken's Wife	
2012	The Polterguys	Megan Tracy	
2012	Slightly Single in L.A.	CeCe	
2013	Breaking Belding	Jessy Spano / Wendy	Short film
2014	Dumbbells	Kim Hertz	
2014	Dr. Cabbie	Rani	
2014	Beautiful Girl	Vivian	
2016	Fifty Shades of Black	Becky	
2018	Book Club	Cheryl	
2018	Grace	Mia	
2019	The Opening Act	Carrie	
2021	Masquerade	Olivia	

=== Television ===
Year	Title	Role	Notes
2005	Freddie	Tammy	Episode: "Pilot"
2006	Just for Kicks		2 episodes
2006	Studio 60 on the Sunset Strip	Crystal	Episode: "The Focus Group"
2007	Scrubs	Heather	Episode: "My No Good Reason"
2007	Drive	Ellie Laird	Main role; 6 episodes
2007	Rules of Engagement	Danielle	Episode: "Guy Code"
2008	Fear Itself	Virginia	Episode: "The Sacrifice"
2008	Sons of Anarchy	Susie	Episode: "Patch Over"
2009	Without a Trace	Isabella Tyler	2 episodes
2009	Zeke and Luther	Hottie Babesworth	Episode: "Summer School"
2010	Miami Medical	Tracy Herskope	2 episodes
2011	Chuck	Amy	Episode: "Chuck Versus the Cat Squad"
2011	Franklin & Bash	DeeDee	2 episodes
2011	Death Valley	Lindsay	Episode: "Help Us Help You"
2011–2015	Hart of Dixie	Tansy Truitt	25 episodes
2011–2017	Episodes	Morning Randolph	26 episodes
2012	Men at Work	Abby	Episode: "Crazy for Milo"
2012	White Collar	Tempest	Episode: "Identity Crisis"
2012	The Mentalist	Tara Skye	Episode: "If It Bleeds, It Leads"
2013	How I Met Your Mother	Liddy Gates	Episode: "Romeward Bound"
2013	Anger Management	Tracey	Episode: "Charlie and His New Friend with Benefits"
2014	Enlisted	Jeanie	Episode: "Brothers and Sister"
2014	Sullivan & Son	Kara	Episode: "A Kiss is Never Just a Kiss"
2014	Nicky, Ricky, Dicky & Dawn	Tiffany	Episode: "Get Sporty-er!"
2015	The Odd Couple	Brooke	Episode: "Jealous Island"
2015	BoJack Horseman	Some Lady / An Actress or Something	Episode: "Higher Love"
2015	Significant Mother	Annie Hole	Episode: "Get Forked"
2015–2016	Impastor	Alexa Cummings	20 episodes
2016	Hell's Kitchen	Herself	Episode: "Don't Tell My Fiance"
2017	Michael Bolton's Big, Sexy Valentine's Day Special	Virtual Woman	Variety special
2018–2023	The Rookie	Isabel Bradford	Recurring role, 7 episodes
2024	Dinner with the Parents	Amy	Episode: "The Langer Game"
2024	The Outlaws	Helena	2 episodes

=== Web ===
Year	Title	Role	Notes
2010	Ghostfacers	Ambyr	9 episodes
2012	Dating Rules from My Future Self	Amanda	9 episodes
2016	Sing It!	Stacey Needles	10 episodes
2018	Uncharted Live Action Fan Film	Elena Fisher	
