= Mircea (ship) =

Romanian sail training ship

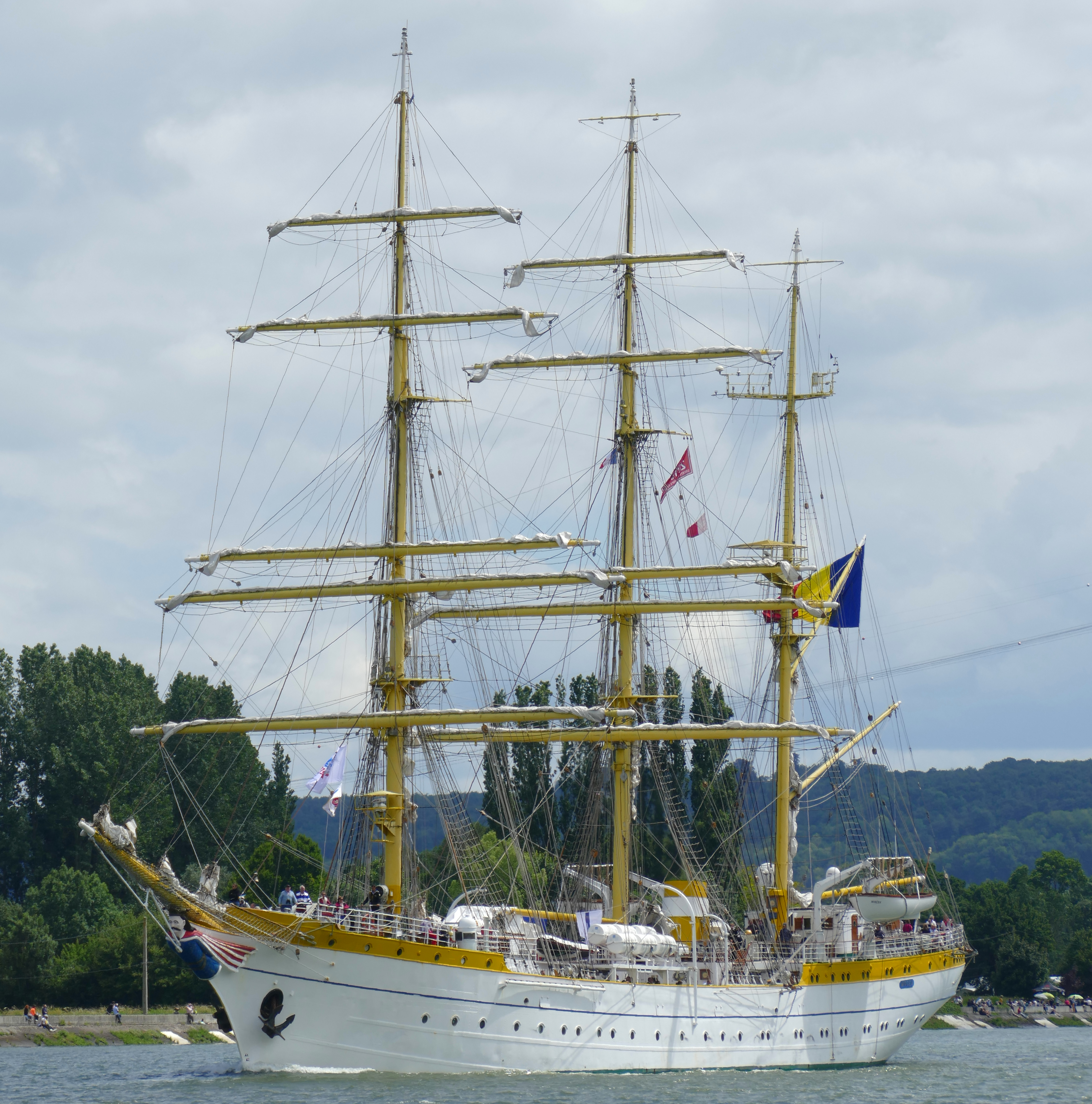
- Mircea in 2019

History

Romania
- Name: Mircea
- Namesake: NMS Mircea (1882), Mircea the Elder
- Ordered: 26 January 1938
- Builder: Blohm & Voss (Hamburg, Germany)
- Yard number: 519
- Laid down: 15 April 1938
- Launched: 22 September 1938
- Sponsored by: Mrs. Brabețeanu
- Acquired: 27 March 1939
- Commissioned: 17 May 1939
- Refit: 1966 & 2002
- Home port: Constanța, Romania
- Identification: MMSI number: 264800057; IMO number: 6110858; MarineTraffic ID: 319525; Callsign: YQBX
- Status: In service
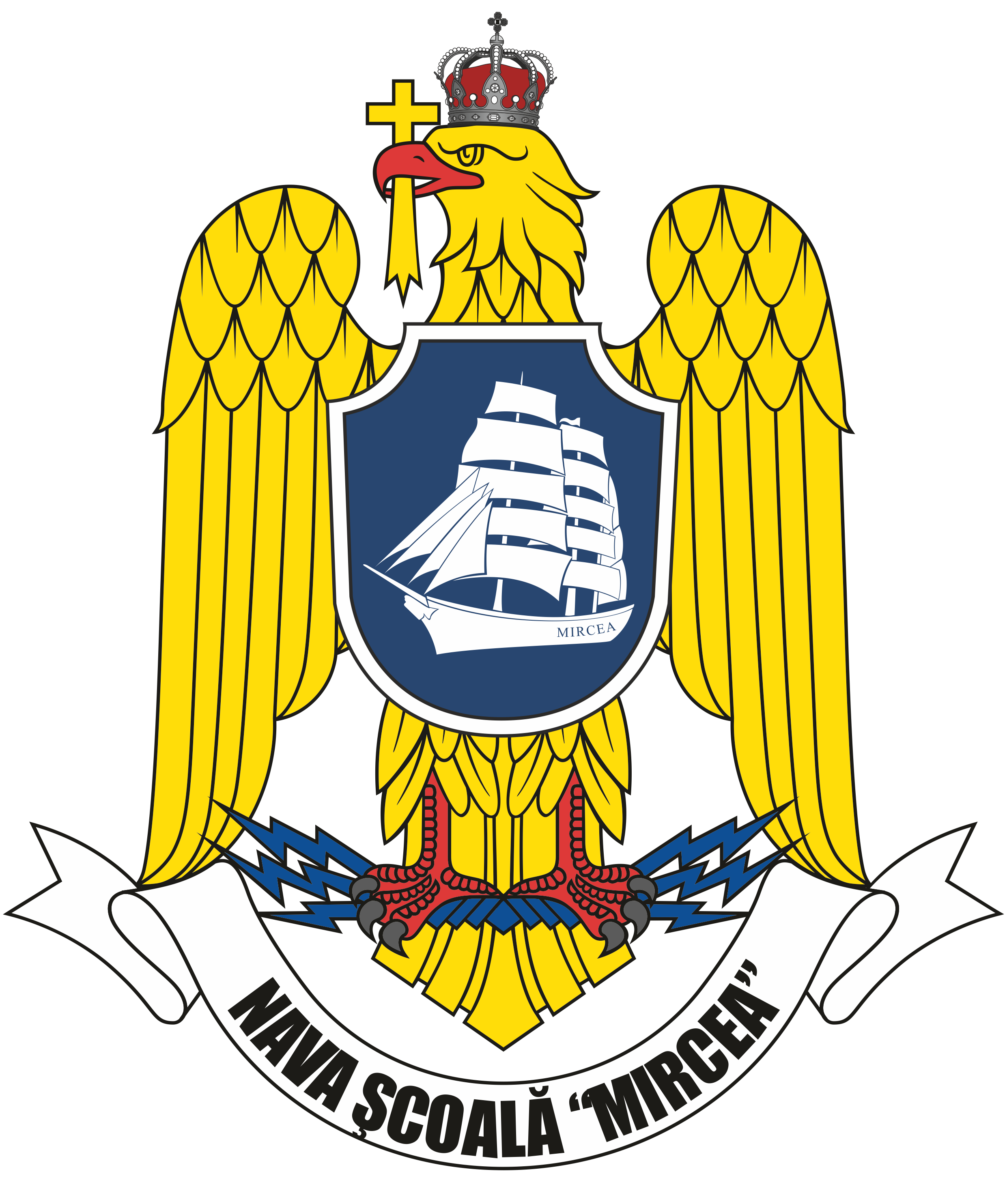
- Badge

Soviet Union
- Name: Rion
- Namesake: Rioni
- Acquired: September 1944
- In service: 20 October 1944
- Fate: Returned to Romania on 27 May 1946

General characteristics
- Class & type: Gorch Fock-class barque
- Tonnage: 1,312 GT; 1,840 DWT
- Length: 82.1 m (269.4 ft)
- Beam: 12 m (39 ft)
- Height: 44 m (144.4 ft)
- Draught: 5.2 m (17 ft)
- Propulsion: 1,100 hp (820 kW) MaK diesel engine
- Sail plan: 3 masts, 23 sails, 1,850 m^{2} (19,900 sq ft)
- Speed: 10 kn (19 km/h; 12 mph) (engine-only)
- Range: 4,000 nmi (7,408.0 km)
- Endurance: 21 days
- Crew: 210 (of which, 120 are students)

Mircea, also known as NS Mircea (Nava Școală Mircea—"School Ship Mircea") or Bricul Mircea (a named carried over from the 1882 ship of the same name), is a three-masted barque built in 1938 in Hamburg by the Blohm & Voss shipyard as a training vessel for the Romanian Navy. Her design is based on the successful plans of Gorch Fock; the last of a series of four sister ships. The ship is named after the Wallachian Voivode, Mircea the Elder. After World War II, she was temporarily taken over by the USSR, but later returned to Romania. In 1966, she was overhauled by Blohm & Voss.

== Description ==
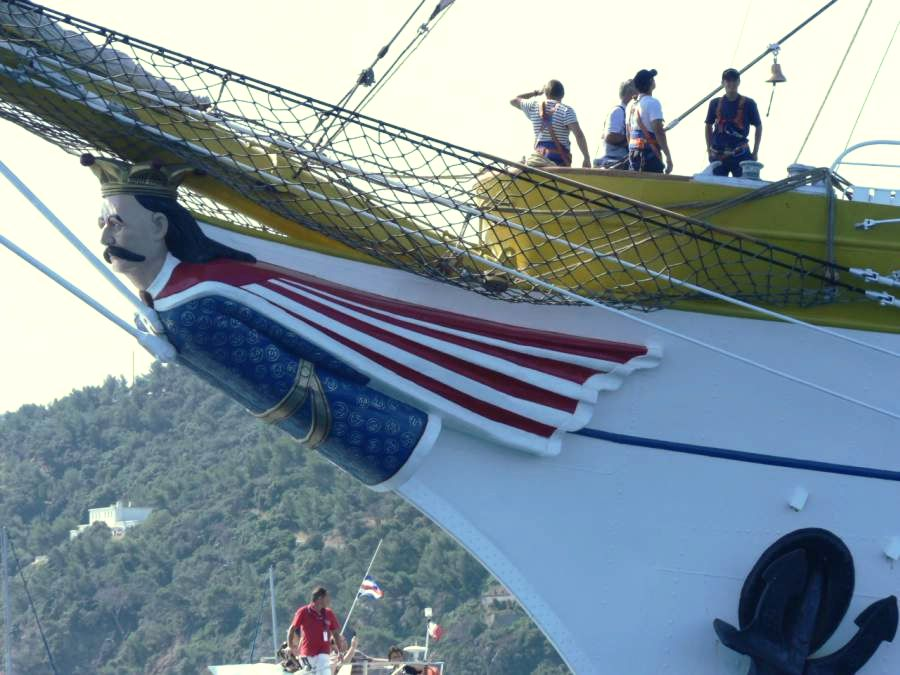
The bow figurehead of the ship

Mircea is a steel-hulled three-masted barque built on the plans of the Gorch Fock, the only sister ship of Gorch Fock built on the original 1933 plans. She has a length of 82.1 m (269.4 ft) or 73.7 m (242 ft) excluding her bowsprit, beam of 12.0 m (39.4 ft), height of 44 m (144.4 ft) and draught of 5.2 m (17 ft). On the bow, Mircea presents a figurehead showing the ruler dressed in a blue blouse, red cloak, and wearing a crown on his head. Her three masts carry 23 sails with a total area of 1,850 m^{2} (19,900 sq ft), allowing her to reach speeds of over 16 knots (30 km/h; 18 mph).

Her original propulsion was a six-cylinder 520 hp (390 kW) MAN diesel engine driving a single propeller of 1.39 m (4 ft 6.7 in) in diameter. The maximum speed using the engine was 8 kn (15 km/h; 9.2 mph). She currently uses a 1,100 hp (820 kW) MaK diesel engine, which allows a maximum speed of 10 kn (19 km/h; 12 mph).

== History ==
=== Background ===
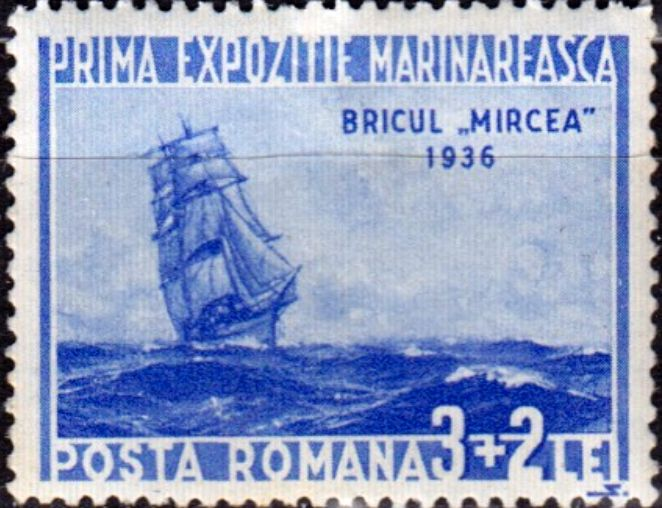
1936 stamp featuring the NMS Mircea

In 1881, the Romanian Navy ordered a sail training vessel from the Thames Ironworks and Shipbuilding Company of London. The sailing brig entered service in 1882 and was named NMS Mircea after Voivode Mircea the Elder, who ruled Wallachia between 1386 and 1418, under whose reign the local navigation and the trade carried out at sea experienced great development, expanding into the Black Sea as well as in the Aegean and Mediterranean Seas. By World War I, discussions began about replacing the old training ship with a new one, as the NMS Mircea required numerous repairs and modifications.

In 1928, the Romanian Naval League, an association affiliated with the Romanian Navy, highlighted the need for a modern school ship for the new requirements of the naval cadets. On Romanian Navy Day in 1936, King Carol II held a speech in which he mentioned that the "Spirit of the Mircea" should be carried on in the Romanian Navy. Following this event, the Naval League organized a national subscription for the purchase of a new ship which would also be called Mircea, based on the examples of the Polish and the Yugoslav naval leagues which acquired the Dar Pomorza and the Jadran respectively in similar ways.

The money was soon gathered and, with the addition of state funds, around 120 million lei were raised. After the offers from various shipbuilders were reviewed, the Blohm & Voss shipyard from Hamburg, Germany was chosen, and the ship was to be based on the Gorch Fock-class.

=== Service history ===
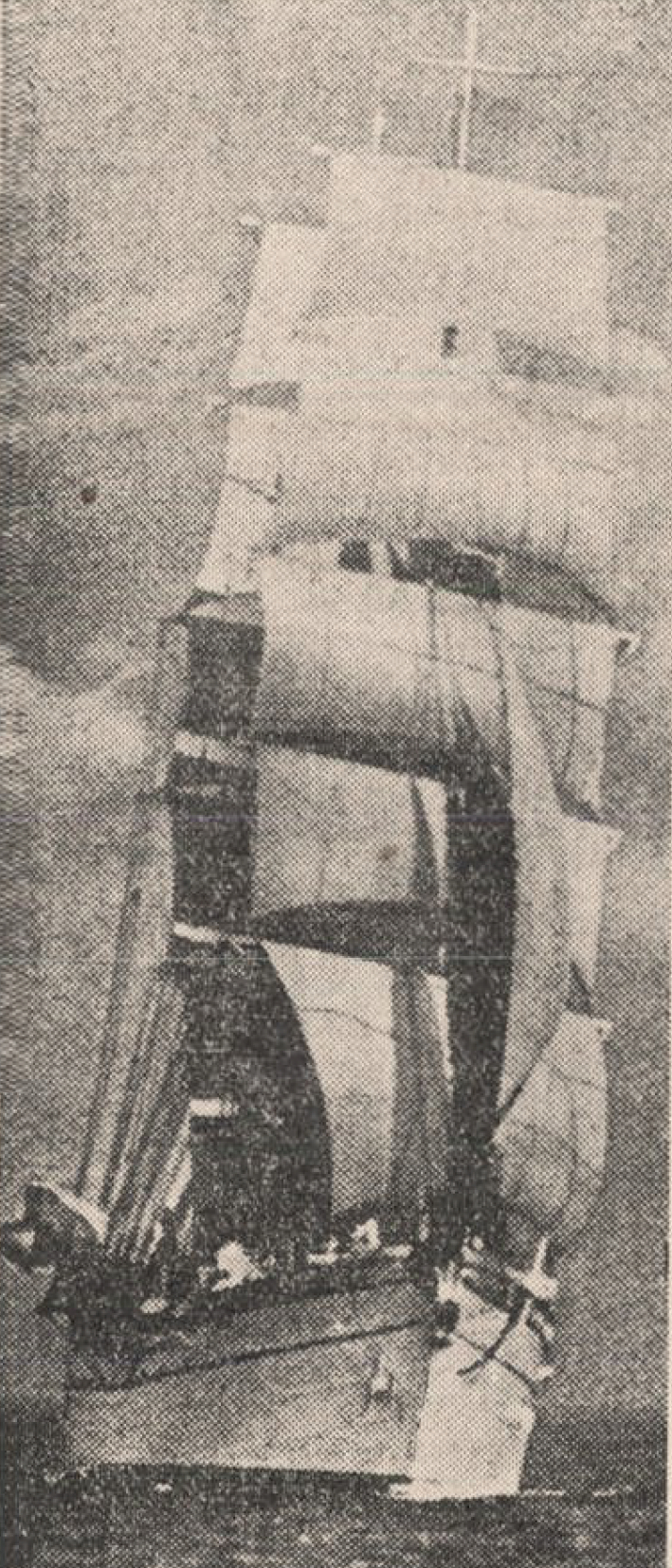
Mircea undergoing sea trials

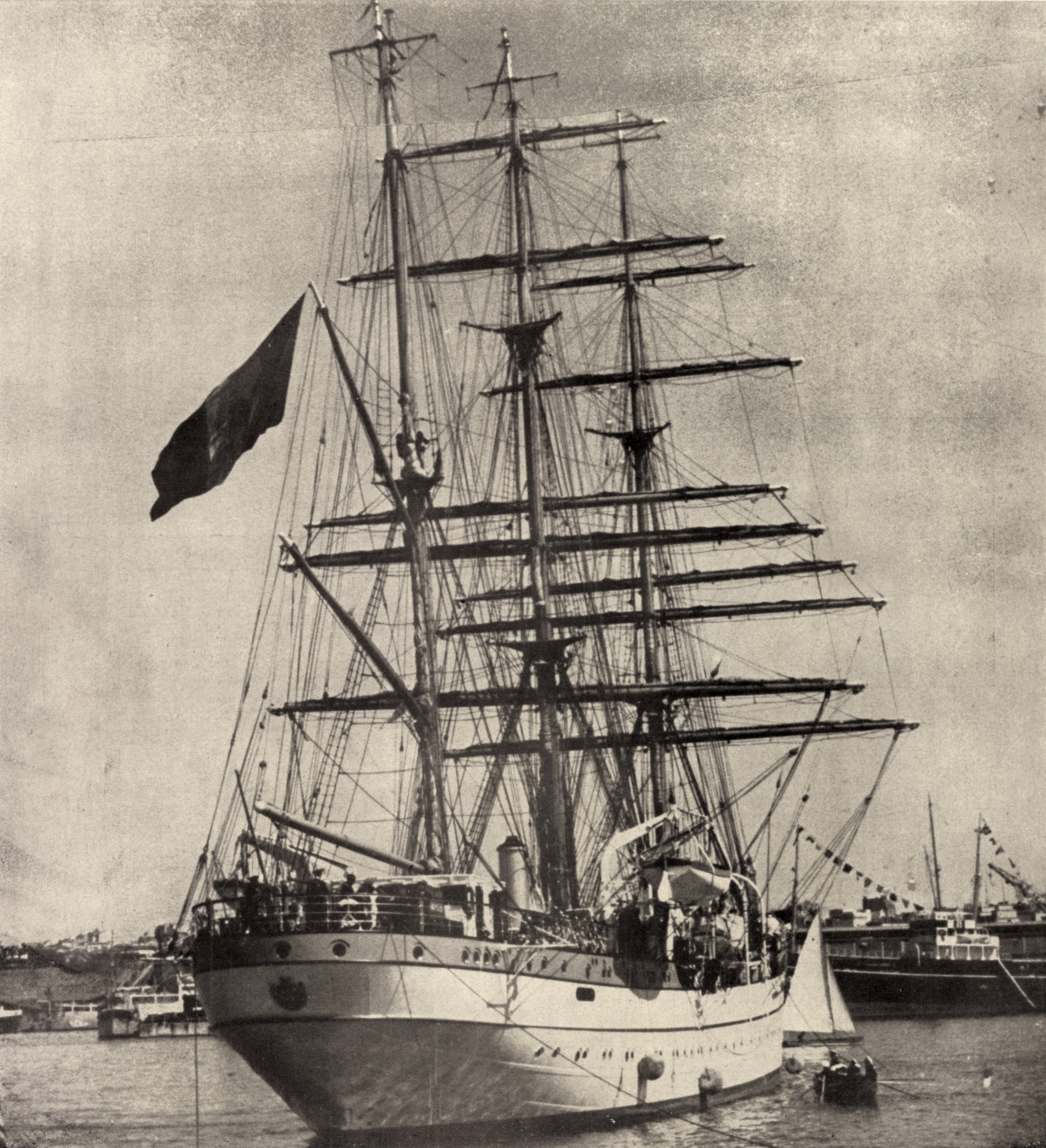
Mircea in Constanța on 17 May 1939

The contract for the vessel was signed with the Blohm & Voss shipyard by the Minister of the Air and Navy, Radu Irimescu, on 26 January 1938. The ship was laid down on 15 April 1938 with the yard number 519. On 22 September 1938, the ship was launched and christened Mircea, with Mrs. Brabețeanu, wife of Counselor Victor Brabețeanu from the Romanian Legation in Berlin, as the ship's sponsor. On 16 January 1939, Mircea began her sea trials and from 25 January, the Romanian crew led by Comandor August Roman began training on the ship under the supervision of Kriegsmarine personnel.

The national flag-raising ceremony took place on 27 March 1939, with Comandor Roman officially taking command of the ship. The voyage to Romania began on 29 March. Mircea left the port of Hamburg in the early morning, navigating under sail and saluted by the vessels docked in the port. She was accompanied by her sister Horst Wessel for the first few miles before reaching Heligoland, where she calibrated her Bellini–Tosi direction finder. Along the way to Romania, Mircea anchored at the ports of Southampton, Lisbon, and Valletta. Entering the Black Sea on 6 May, she stopped at Balchik for 10 days. On 17 May 1939, Mircea entered the port of Constanța, being greeted by officials and young students of the Naval School and the ships docked in the port, including the old NMS Mircea.

On 3 July 1939, Mircea left for her first training voyage in the Mediterranean Sea with a crew of 11 officers, 16 foremen, 37 cadets from the Naval School, 83 students from military schools, and 67 sailors. She stopped at the ports of Palermo, Toulon, Palma, Gibraltar, Algiers and Alexandria. The last part of the voyage, which included visits to Syria, Cyprus and the Greek Islands, was canceled because of the German attack on Poland. Thus, on 3 September 1939, Mircea returned to Constanța, where she was docked at the military berth.

The outbreak of the Second World War started a long period, over 25 years, in which Mircea did not execute any long voyages representing Romania outside the Black Sea. For safety, on 19 February 1941, the ship was docked at Brăila on the Arapu arm of the Danube. She stayed there until the summer of 1944. In September 1944, she was taken by Soviet authorities along with other Romanian ships and sent to Soviet ports while the crews were interned in camps. Mircea was given the name Rion on 20 October 1944 and entered Soviet Navy service. While assigned to the Black Sea Fleet, the ship was used in the filming of the movie Admiral Nakhimov in 1945. Modified by carpenters and specialists, the three-masted barque portrayed the Velikiy Knyaz Konstantin, the Kagul, and Nakhimov's flagship, the Imperatritsa Maria for on location filming. At the request of Vice Admiral Petre Bărbuneanu, the ship was returned to the Romanian Navy a year later, reentering Romanian service on 27 May 1946. Upon entry into port, the flags of Romania and the Allied Control Commission members were hoisted. The ceremony was attended by King Michael I, Prime Minister Petru Groza, members of the government, and other representatives of Constanța. At the same time, the coastal battery Vulturul performed the 21-gun salute on the King's arrival.

Between 1946 and 1947, the ship underwent some repairs, mainly on the masts. Training voyages resumed in 1947, though only short ones in the Black Sea. In 1959, amid plans of reducing the number of ships in service, it was proposed to decommission the vessel. Through the intervention of several Navy representatives, the ship was transferred to the 129th Auxiliary Ship Divizion from Mangalia, thereby saving the ship by removing her from training service.

Following some favorable regulations between the Romanian and the American government, an invitation was received on behalf of President John F. Kennedy in 1963, for the school ship Mircea to visit American ports and to participate in a series of festivities. Although not honored, the invitation still attracted the attention of the First Secretary of the Romanian Communist Party, Gheorghe Gheorghiu-Dej. A year later, in August 1964, the ship participated in festivities on the Romanian Navy Day. On this occasion, it was decided that Mircea should be repaired and modernized to resume its role as a school ship.

==== 1966 refit ====
After analyzing the ship, it was established that Mircea required major repairs and modernization. Blohm & Voss and its specialists were deemed the most suitable to carry out the works. In October 1964, Mircea was brought from Mangalia to Constanța, where a group of German technicians and Romanian officers inspected her. In the spring of 1965, Captain-Commander Petre Zamfir was appointed as the ship's commander, and plans were drawn up for the march to Hamburg. Two military tugboats, RM-101 Viteazul and NS-116 Voinicul, were assigned to the mission. The three ships were to sail under the Navrom registry and make stops at Valletta, Gibraltar, and Dover. The convoy departed on 12 October 1965.

Entering the Atlantic on 7 November, the ships encountered severe storms which forced them to take shelter in Lisbon until 22 November. On 24 November, Mircea along with her tugboats began traversing the Bay of Biscay. Two days later, the convoy encountered a scale 8 storm during which the tow on Mircea broke, leaving the ship drifting towards the large 16-meter-tall buoy which marked the maximum approach limit to the rock bank at Chaussée de Sein. The ship hit the buoy, which punctured several holes on the waterline at the ship's bow, while also breaking the port side spars and the starboard boat. Mircea sent an SOS signal which was picked up by French port authorities of Brest. Refusing to abandon ship, the captain and crew stayed and attempted to tow the ship away with the aid of French rescue vessels. After several failed attempts, Mircea was finally pulled away on 28 November and reached the port of Brest. Only one sailor was lightly injured during the incident.

Continuing the journey, the ship, together with her tugboats, arrived in Hamburg on 19 January 1966. The repair and modernization works continued until 24 August. Two reception marches followed in the North Sea in September. Mircea returned to Constanța on 7 November 1966.

==== Sail Amsterdam 700 and Op Sail 76 ====
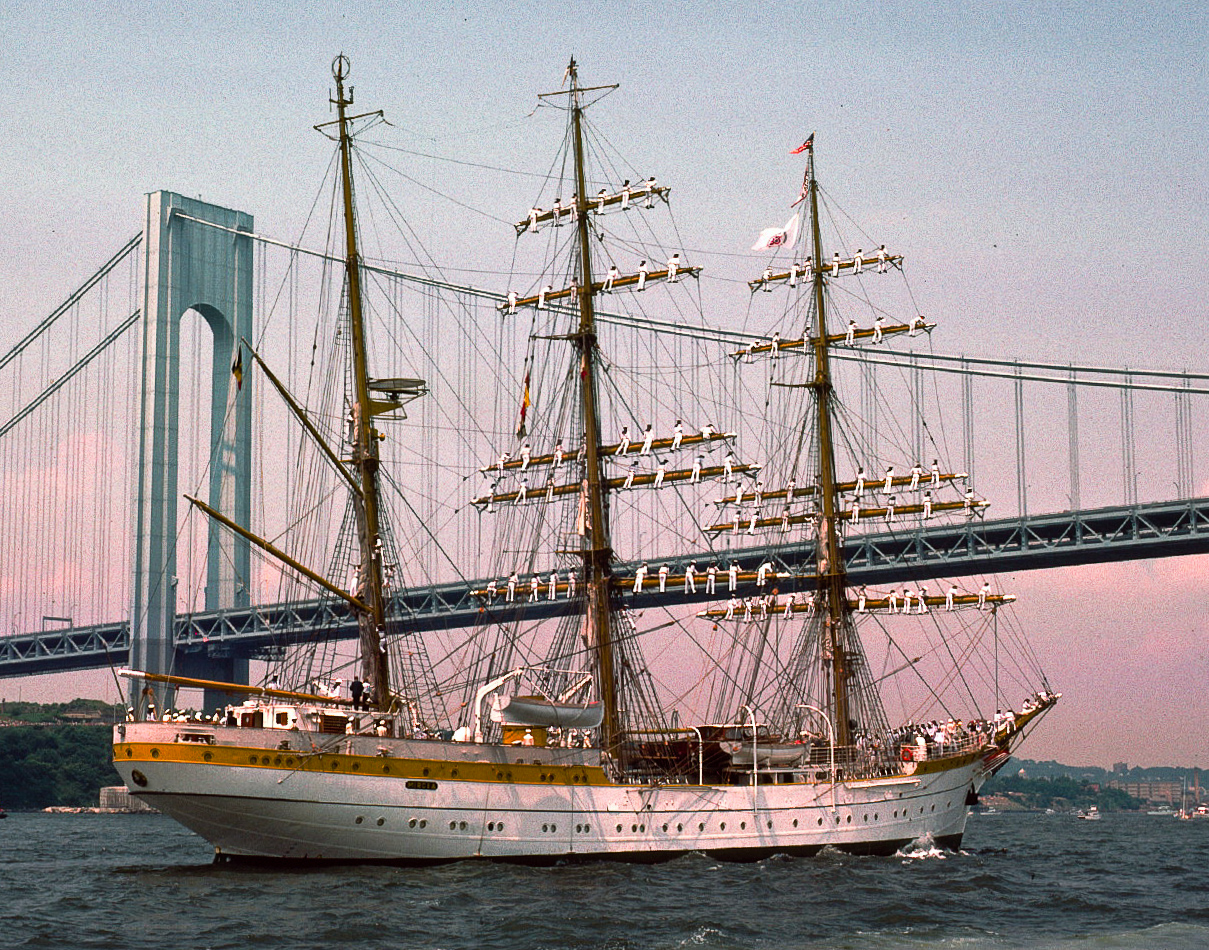
Mircea during Operation Sail 1976 in New York City

After her refit, several voyages followed. Under the command of captain Eugen Ispas, the ship participated in Sail Amsterdam 700 in 1975, the 700th anniversary of Amsterdam. During the ceremonial activities, the crew of Mircea performed a salute from the yards of the masts by taking off their caps and shouting "Ura!" ("Hurrah!"). This salute became known as "Ispas' salute" and has been performed by the crew of Mircea at various ceremonies ever since.

In 1976, Mircea traversed the Atlantic for the first time, travelling from Las Palmas to the Caribbean using only the sails. Arriving in the United States, the ship participated in the Grand Parade of Sailing Ships of the United States Bicentennial at New York on 4 July 1976. On 16 July, Mircea arrived in Philadelphia but was quickly recalled home after a third member of the crew deserted during the voyage in America, thus cancelling the planned visits to Bermuda and the Azores. The Bicentennial of the United States marked the last and only time when all five Gorch Fock sisters met in the same place. Between 1977 and 1994, the school ship Mircea made voyages on the Black Sea and Mediterranean Sea, according to the plans for the practical training of students, but also for representation.

==== Since 2002 ====
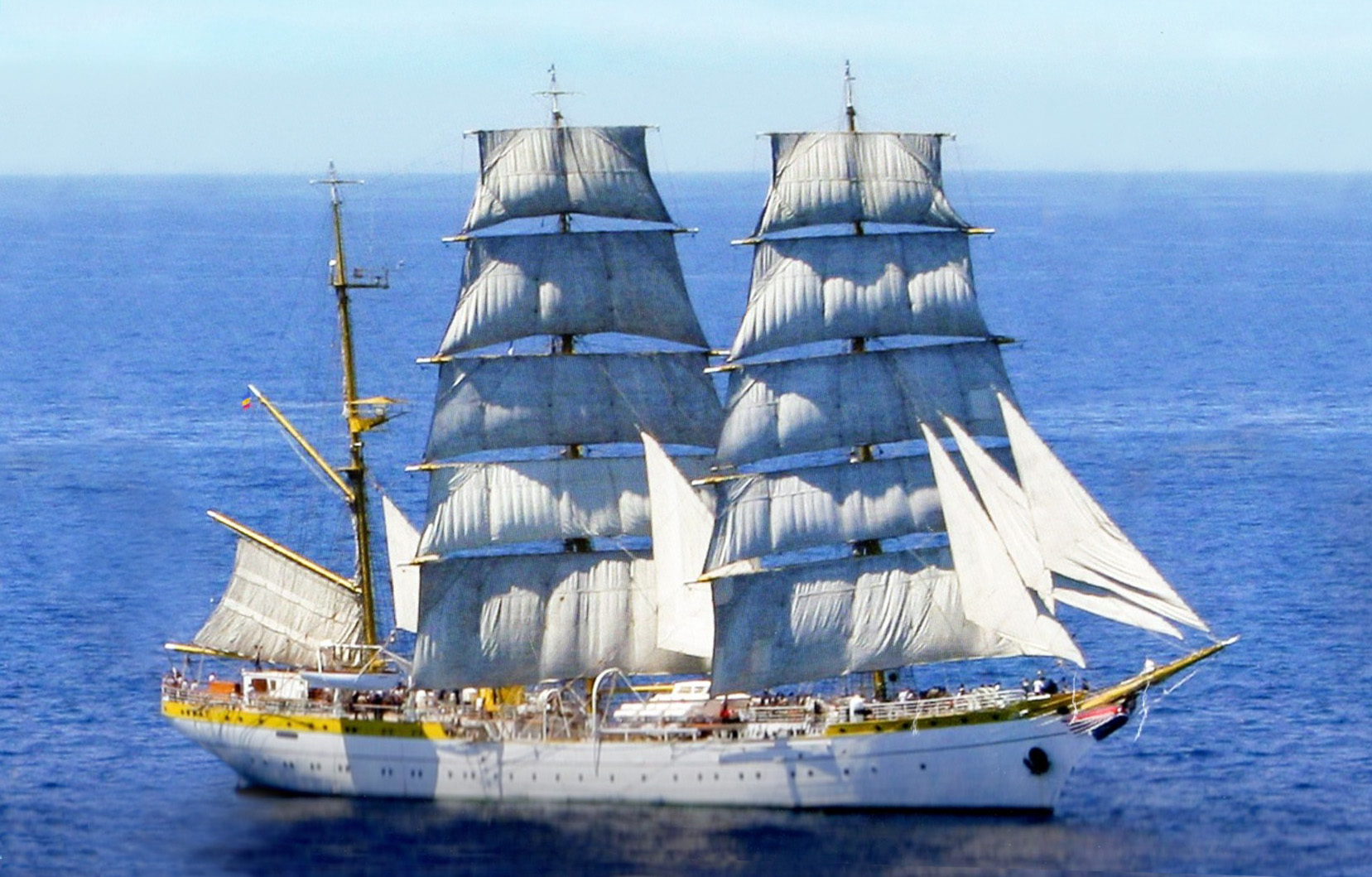
Mircea off the French Riviera in 2007

Between 4 October 1994 and 2002, modernization works were carried out at the Brăila shipyard. In 2004, Mircea participated in the "Tall Ships Challenge - 2004". In the following year, the ship received numerous invitations to participate in various events. Thus, she participated in the festivities of the 175th anniversary of Belgium at Zeebrugge, in the festivities of the National Day of France at Cherbourg, she participated in the "Tall Ships Race 2005", in the "SAIL Bremerhaven 2005" at Bremerhaven and at the "SAIL Amsterdam 2005" festival in the Netherlands. In 2007, Mircea participated in "The Tall Ships Races 2007". She also participated in other international regattas: "Black Sea Tall Ship Race Regatta 2014" in the Black Sea, "The Tall Ships Races 2017" in the Baltic Sea, "The Liberty Tall Ship Regatta 2019" in the English Channel and North Sea.

Throughout her career, the ship was visited by sovereigns, heads of state, fleet commanders, generals, admirals, politicians, and personalities from the world of culture and science. As of 2026, the ship has carried out 43 training marches in international waters and has crossed the Atlantic four times.

In 2026, Mircea travelled to America to participate in Sail250, the event organized to mark the United States Semiquincentennial. The ship met three of her sister ships again since 1976. After departing New York, the four sister ships participated in the "Five Sisters Cup" on 9 July 2026, a tall ship race held between the Gorch Fock sisters that took place between New York to Provincetown, on the way to Boston.

Mircea and her sister ship USCGC Eagle departing New York in 2026

== Sister ships ==
- Gorch Fock (1933) (ex Tovarishch (1951-2003))
- USCGC Eagle (1936, ex Horst Wessel)
- NRP Sagres (1937, ex Albert Leo Schlageter)
- Herbert Norkus (begun 1939, unfinished)
- Gorch Fock (1958) (built with parts left from Herbert Norkus)

== Gallery ==
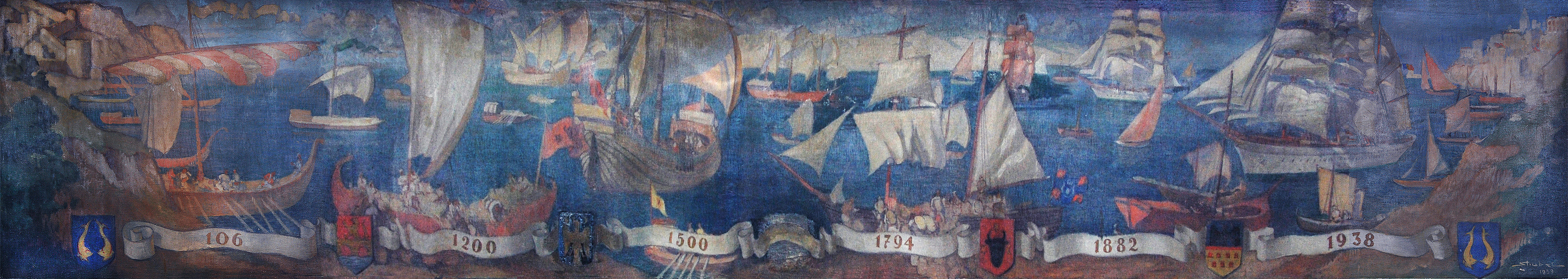
The oil painting from the officer quarters aboard the Mircea representing a chronology of the Romanian ships, Dimitrie Știubei, 1939

Mircea in Romania
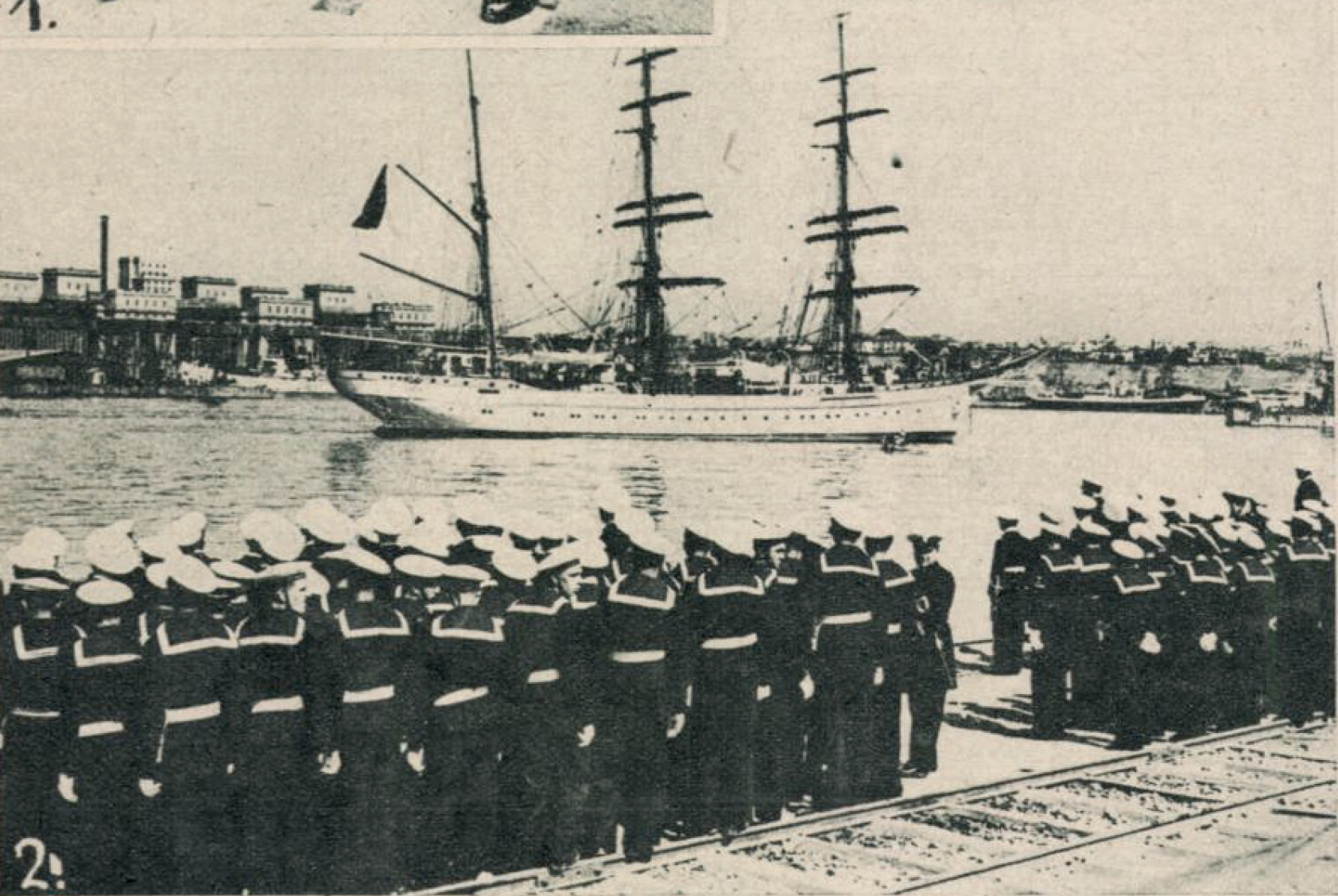
Entering the port of Constanța, 17 May 1939

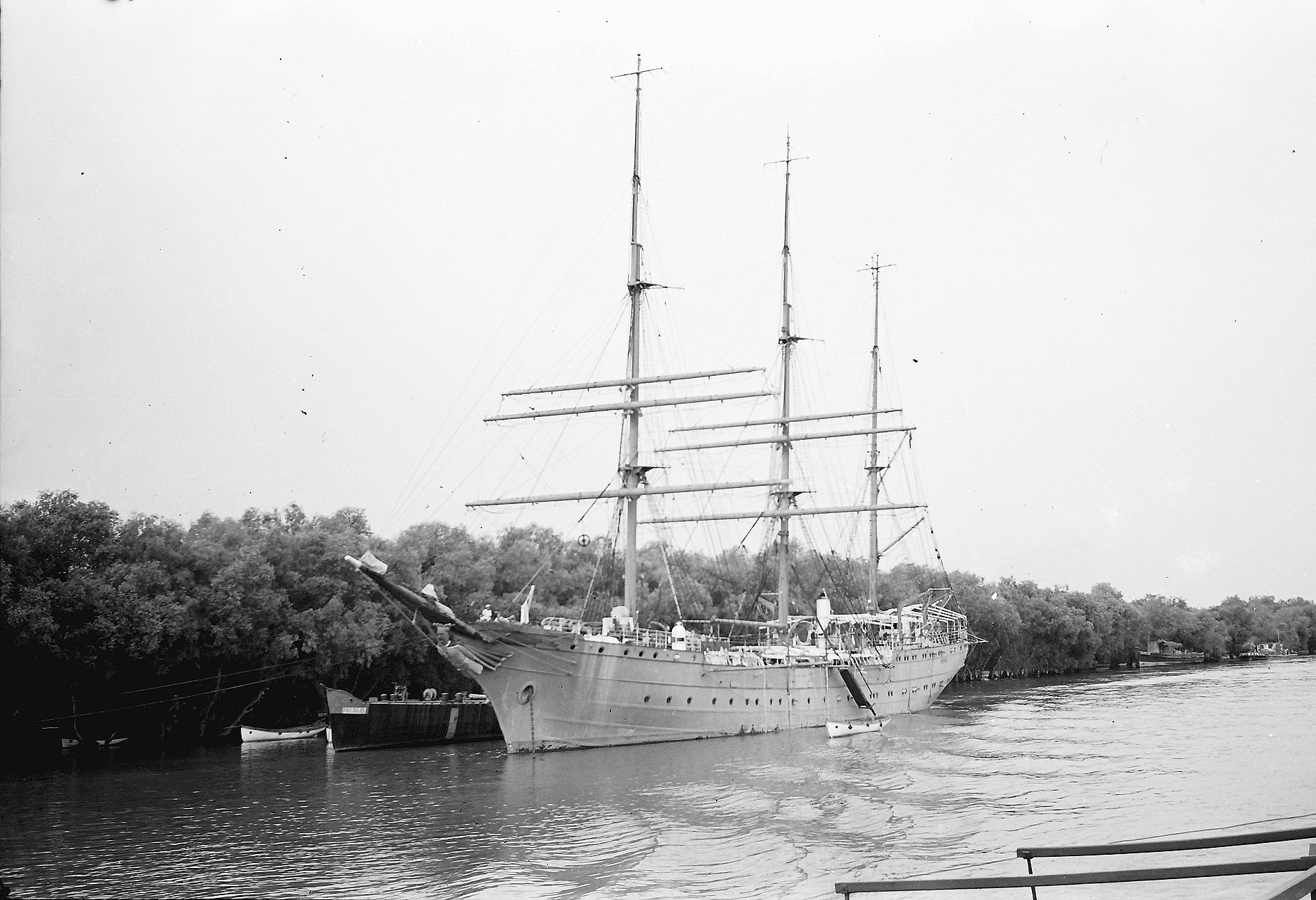
On the Arapu arm near Brăila

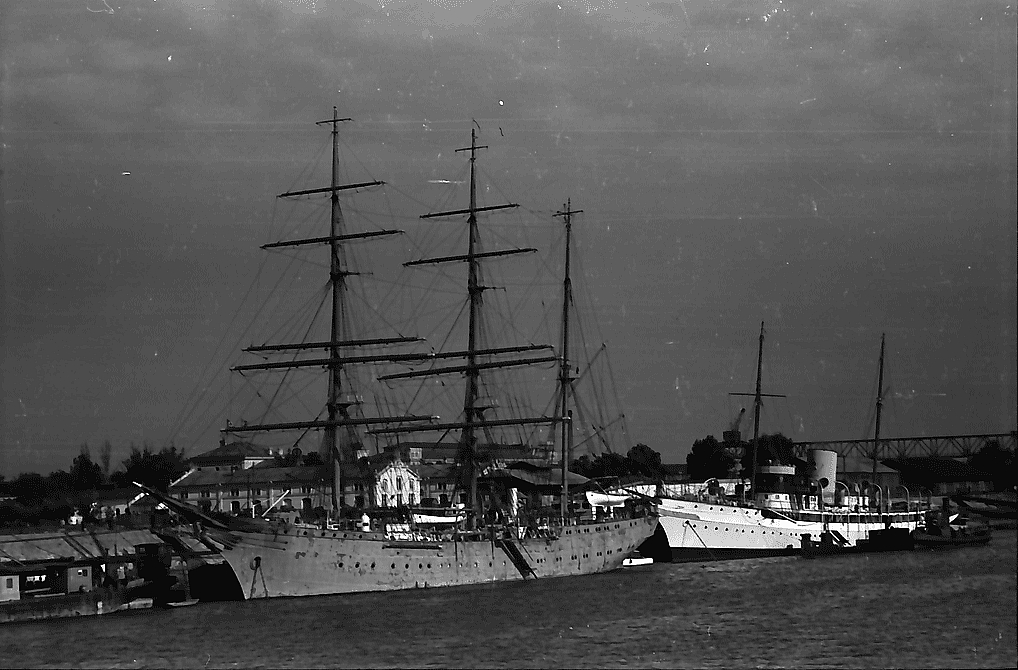
At Brăila with Luceafărul in 1943

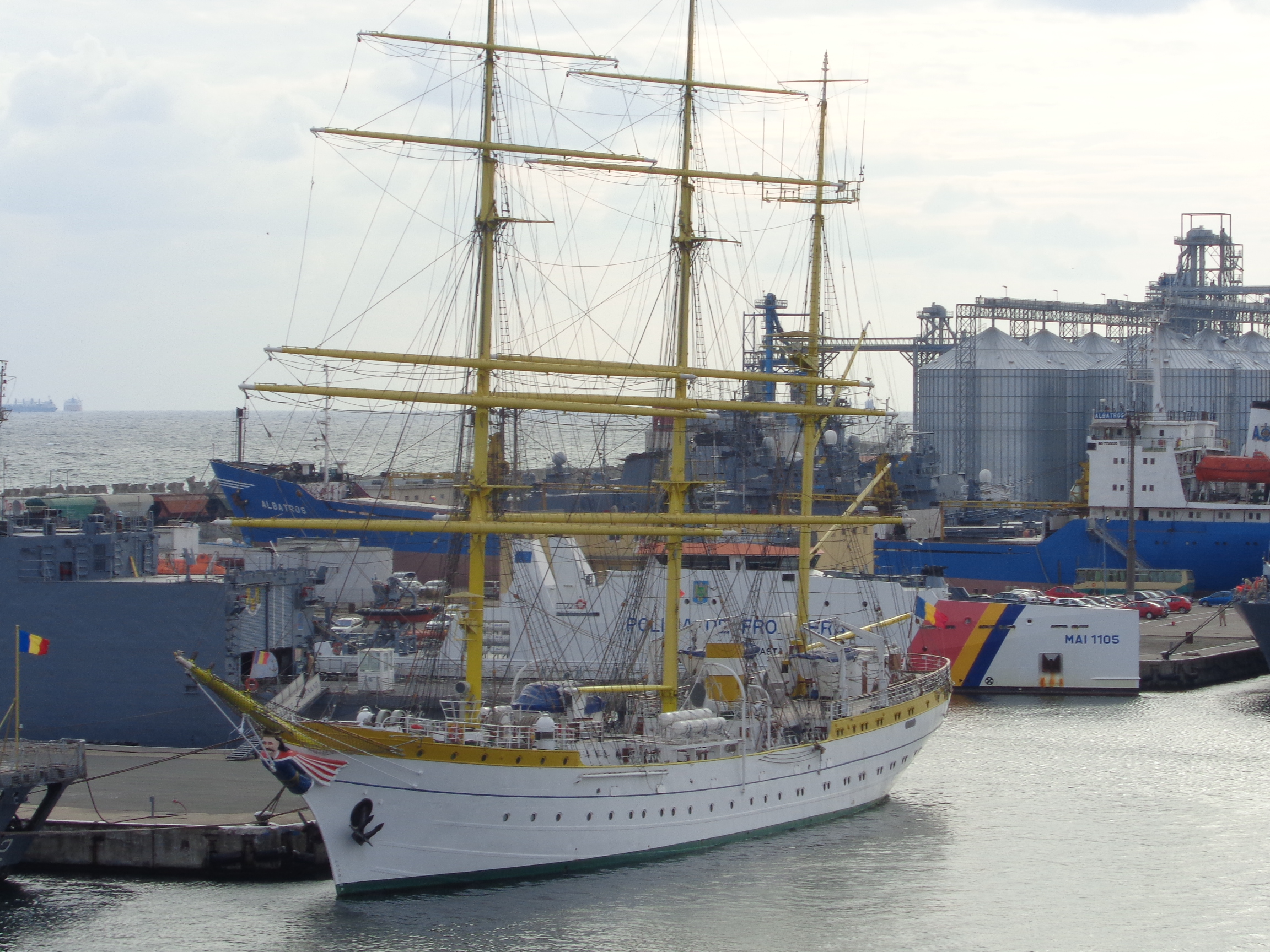
At Constanța in 2014

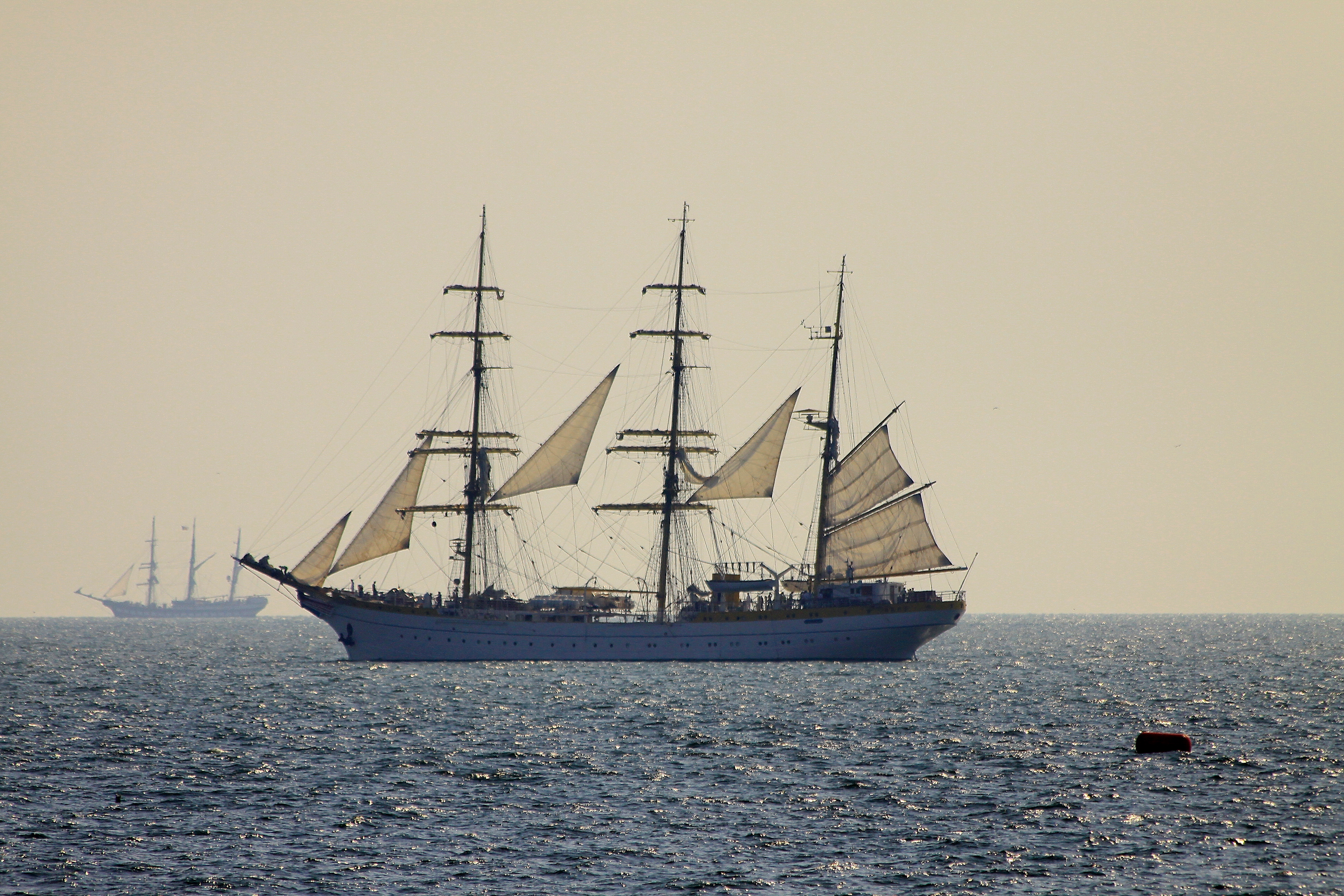
During Romanian Navy Day 2018
Mircea at SAIL Amsterdam 700
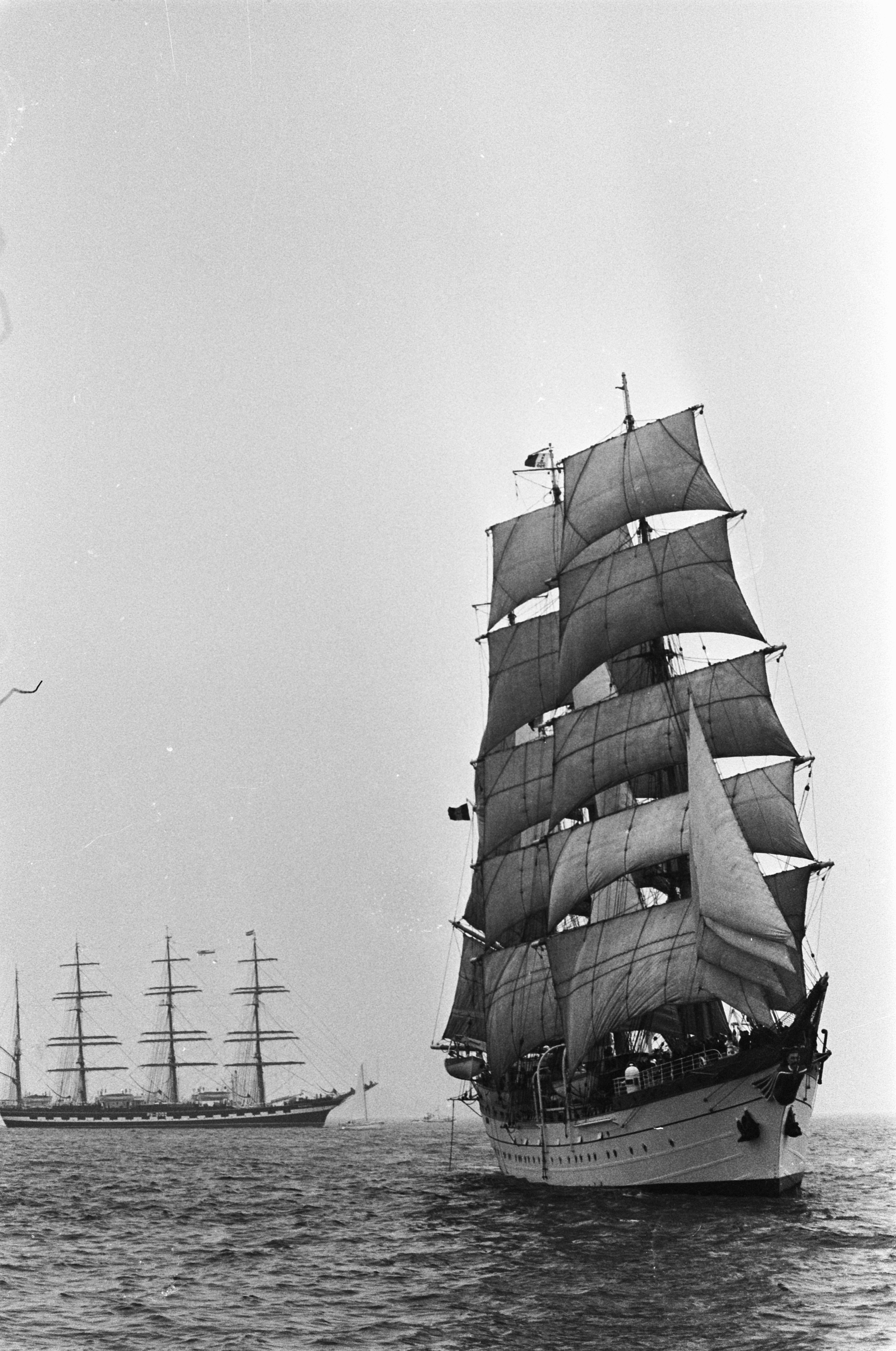
With Kruzenshtern

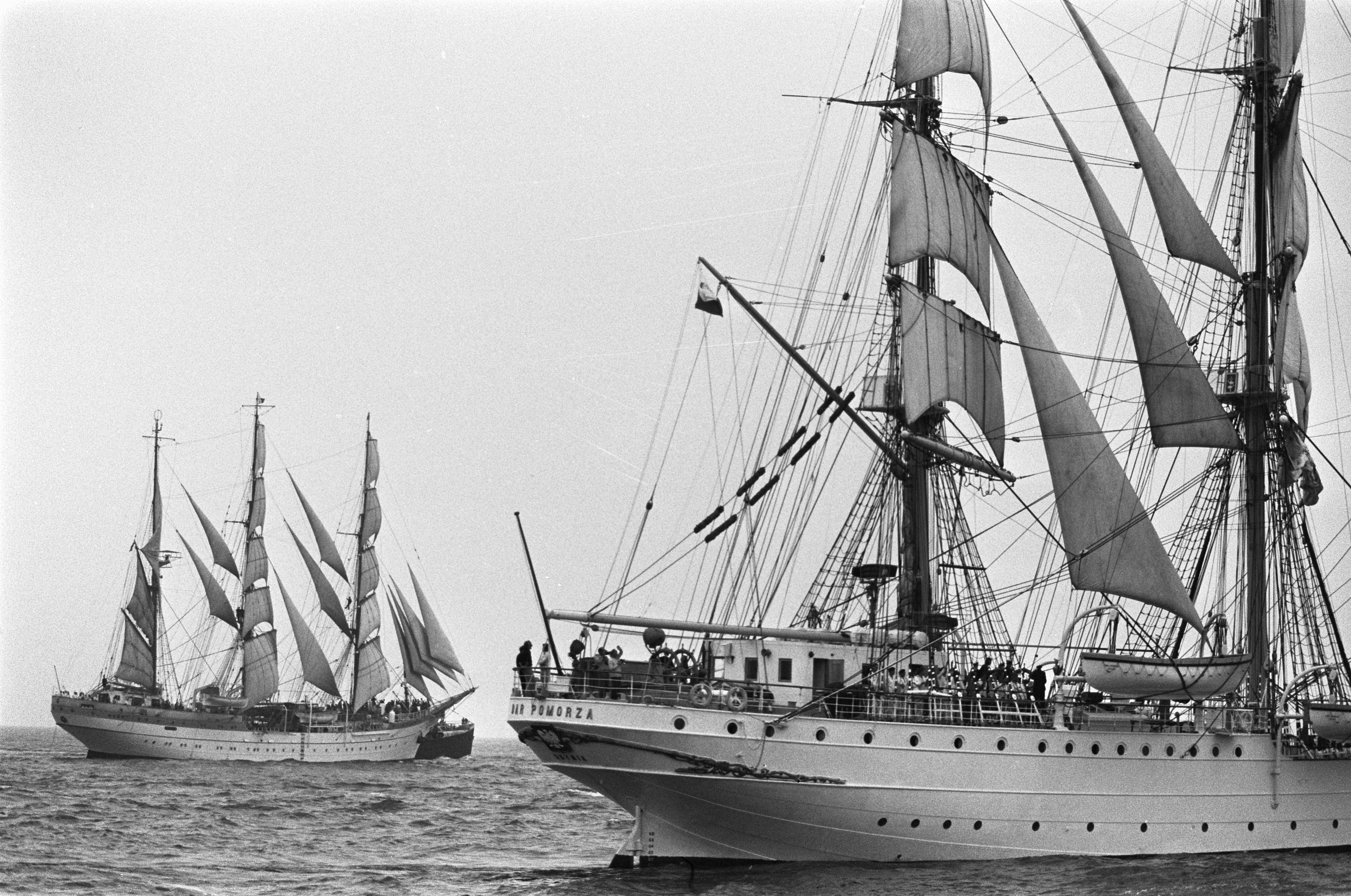
With Dar Pomorza

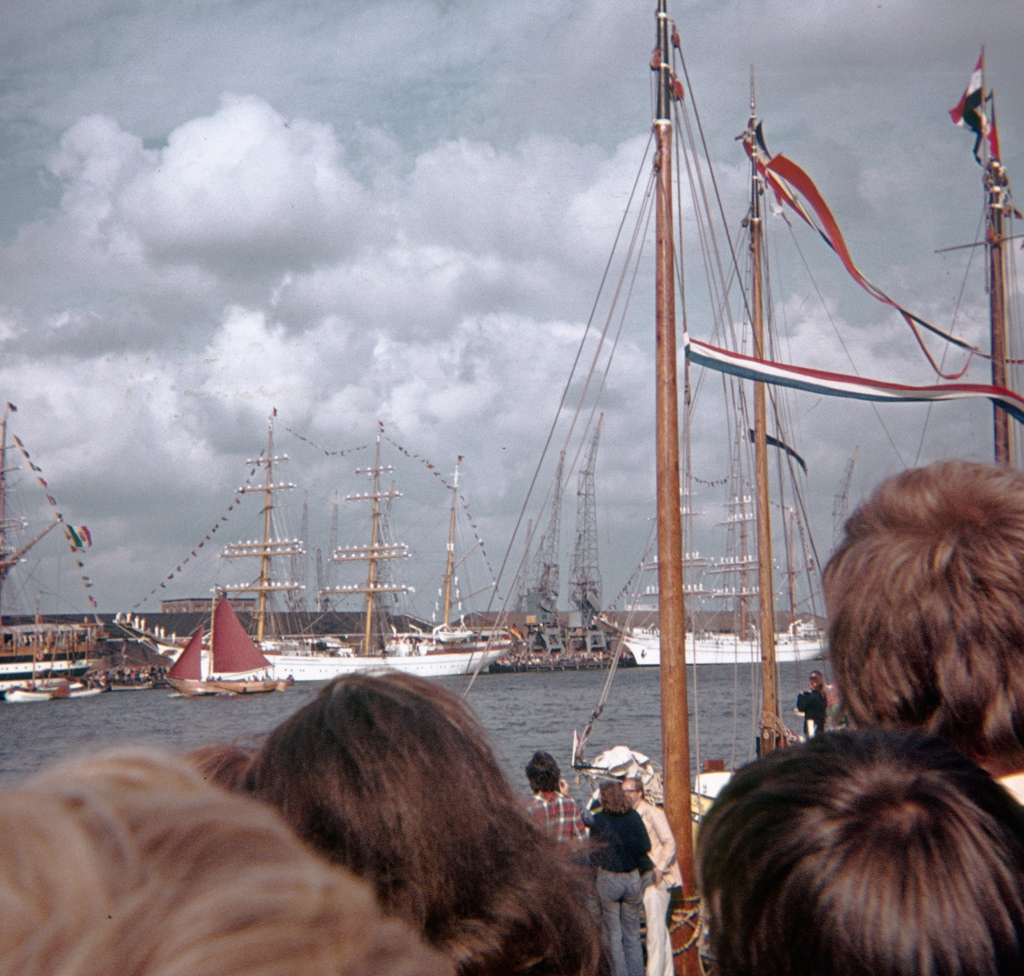
With Gorch Fock
Mircea between 2007 and 2022
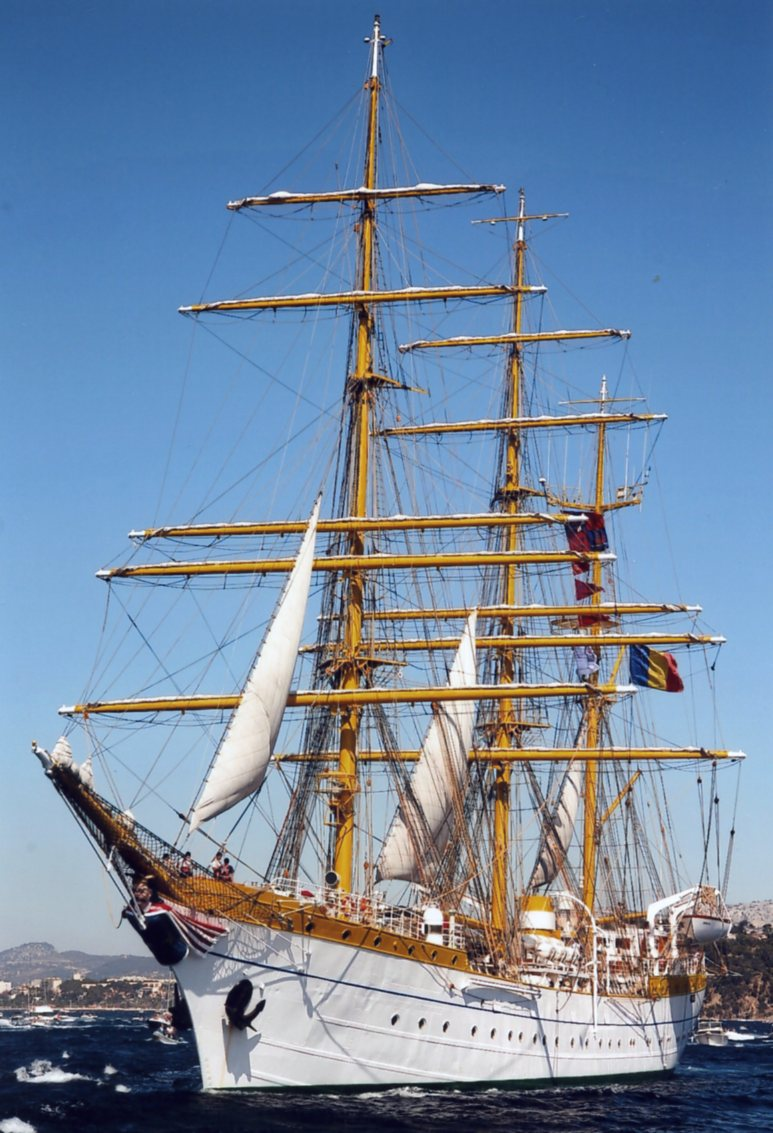
At Toulon, Tall Ships' Races, 2007

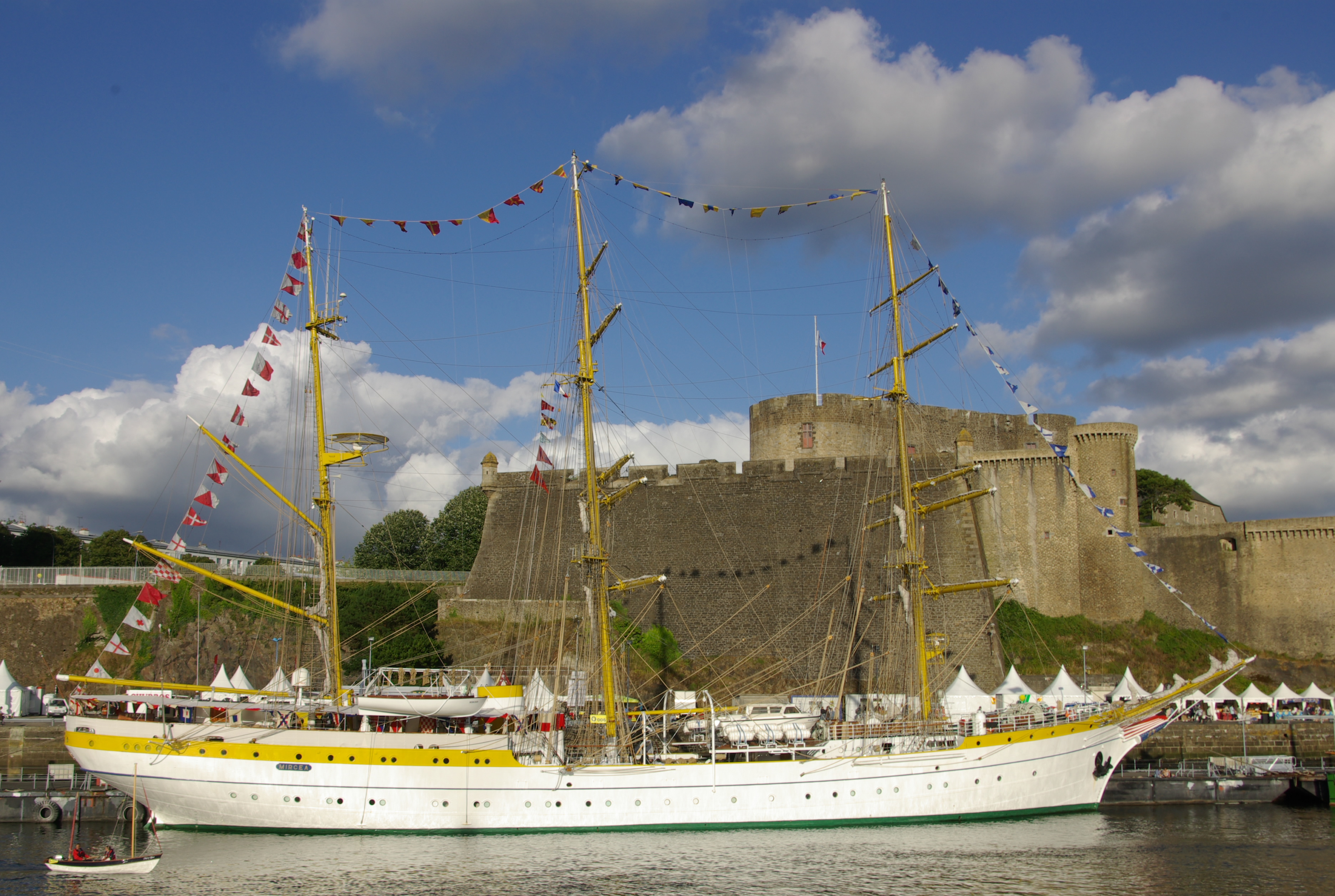
At Brest, 2008

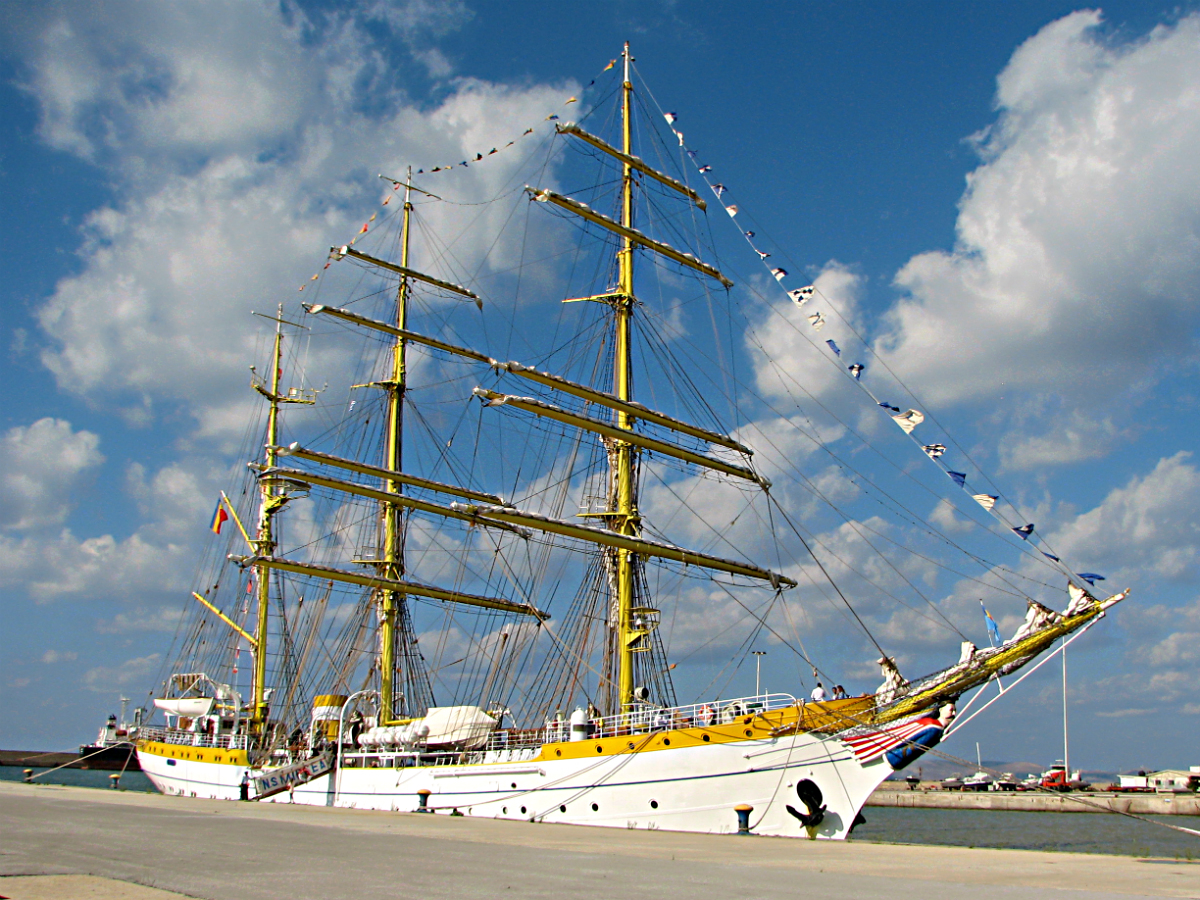
At Heraklion, 2016

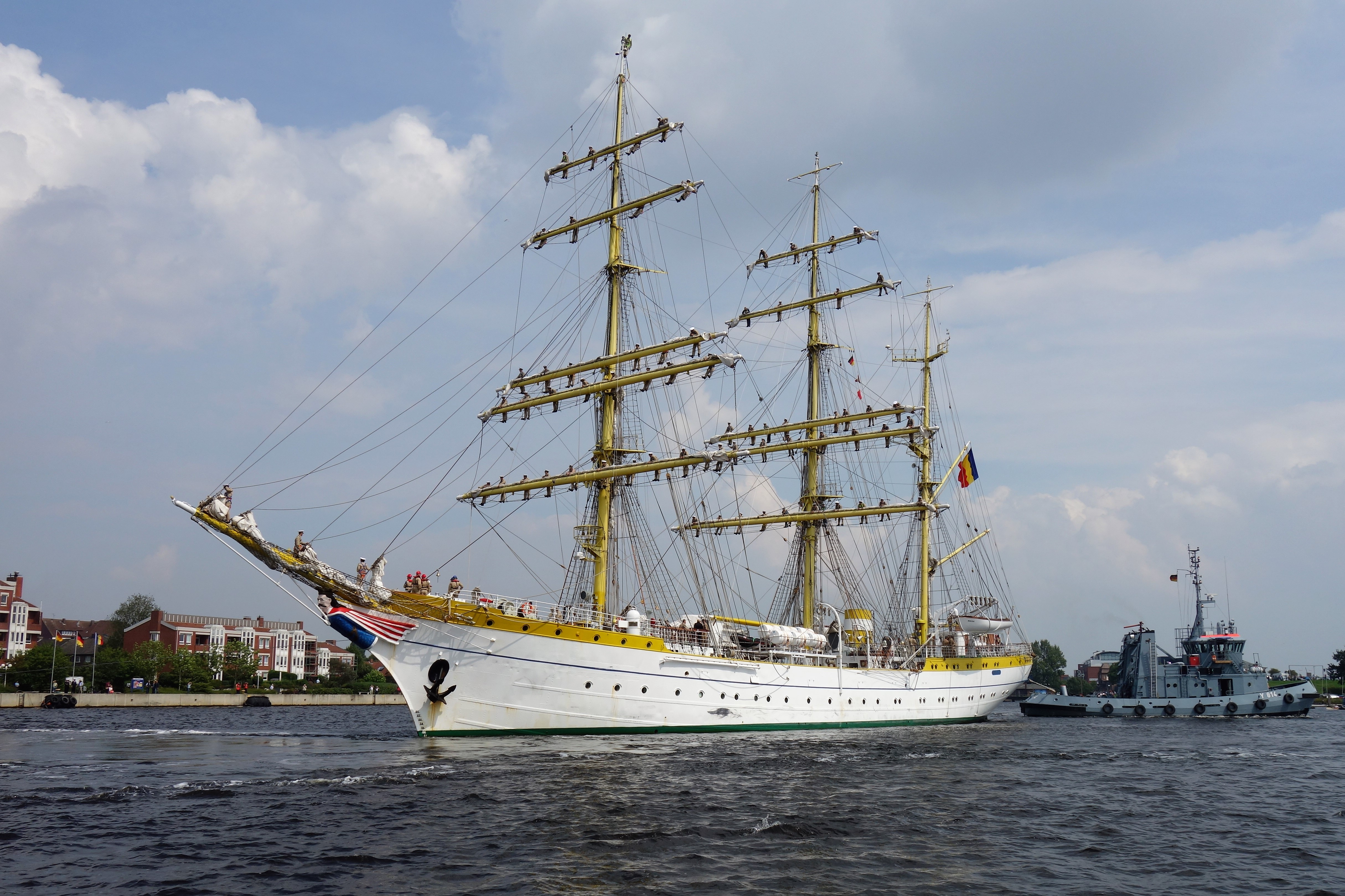
At Wilhelmshaven, 2017

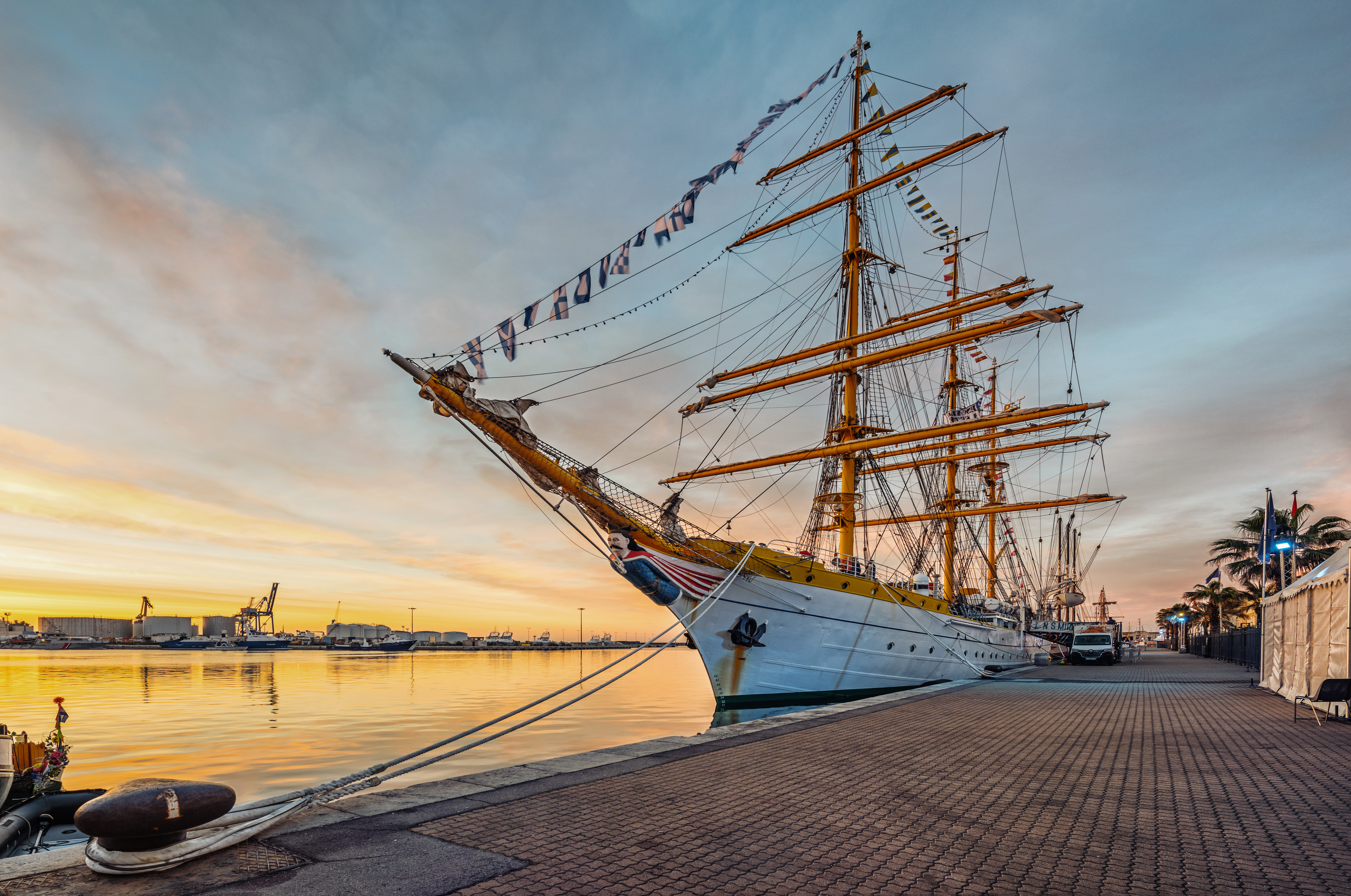
At Sète, 2022
Mircea during Sail250
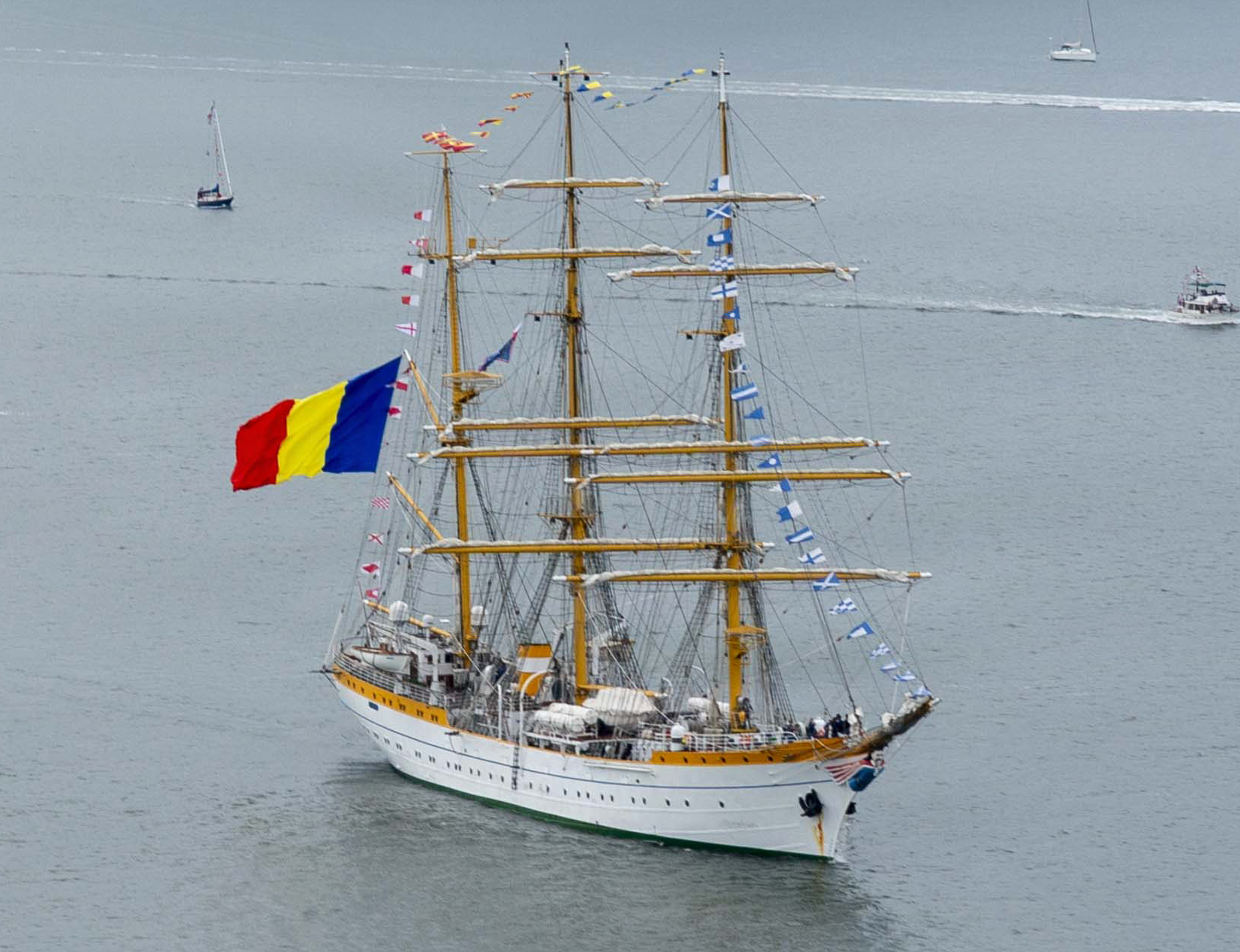
Sailing into Norfolk, Virginia

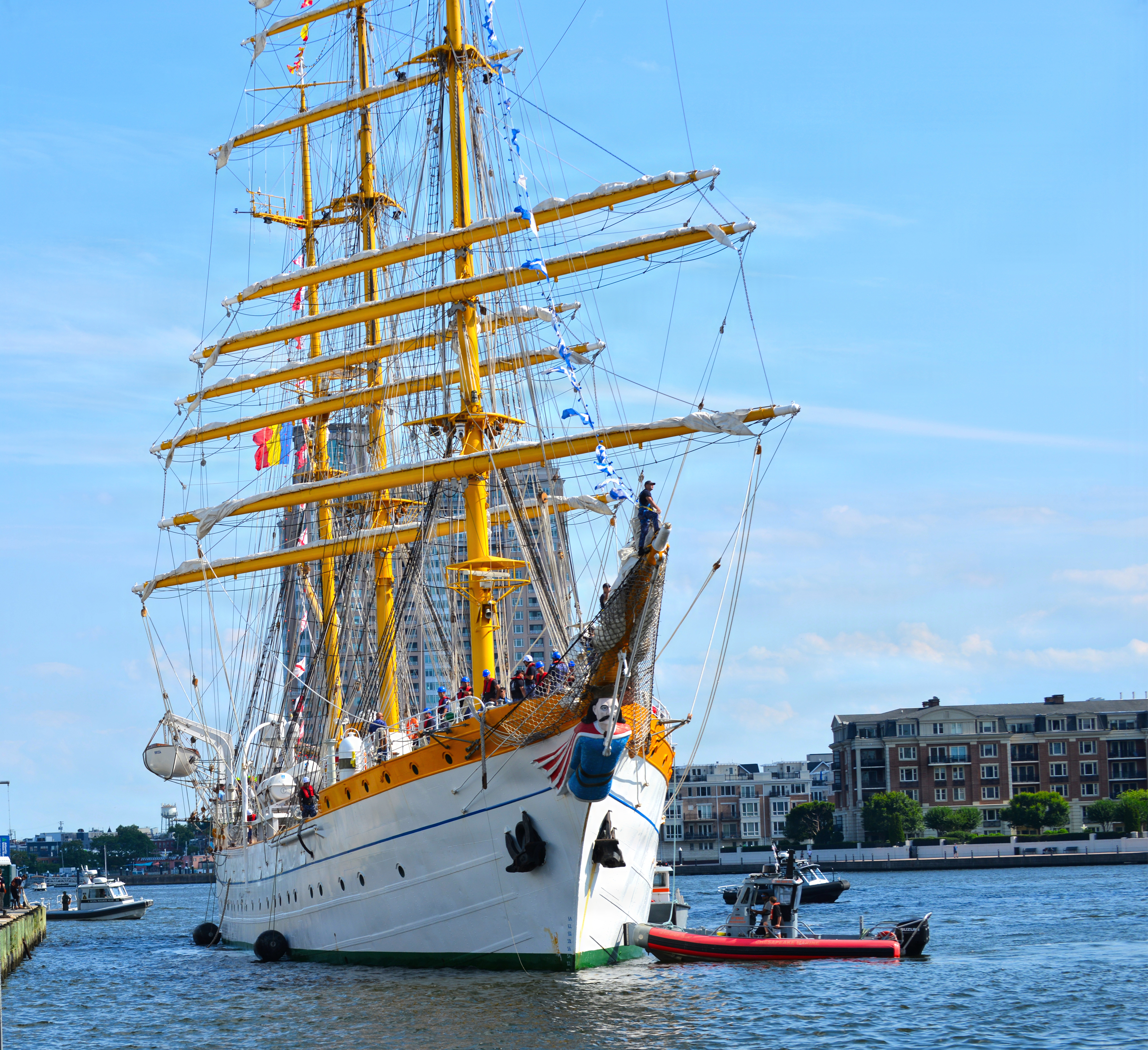
Mooring at Baltimore Inner Harbor

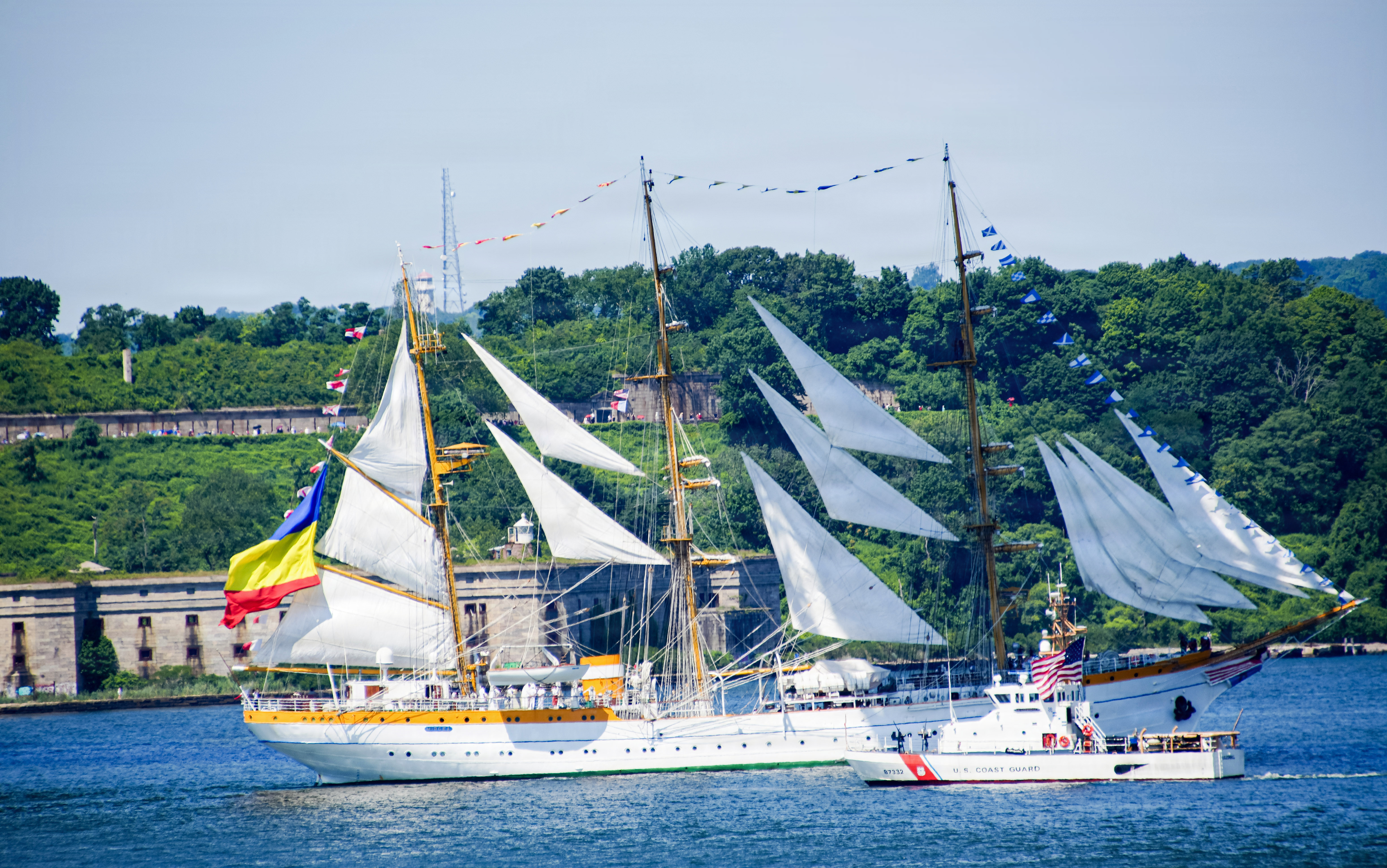
Seen from Fort Hamilton on 4 July 2026

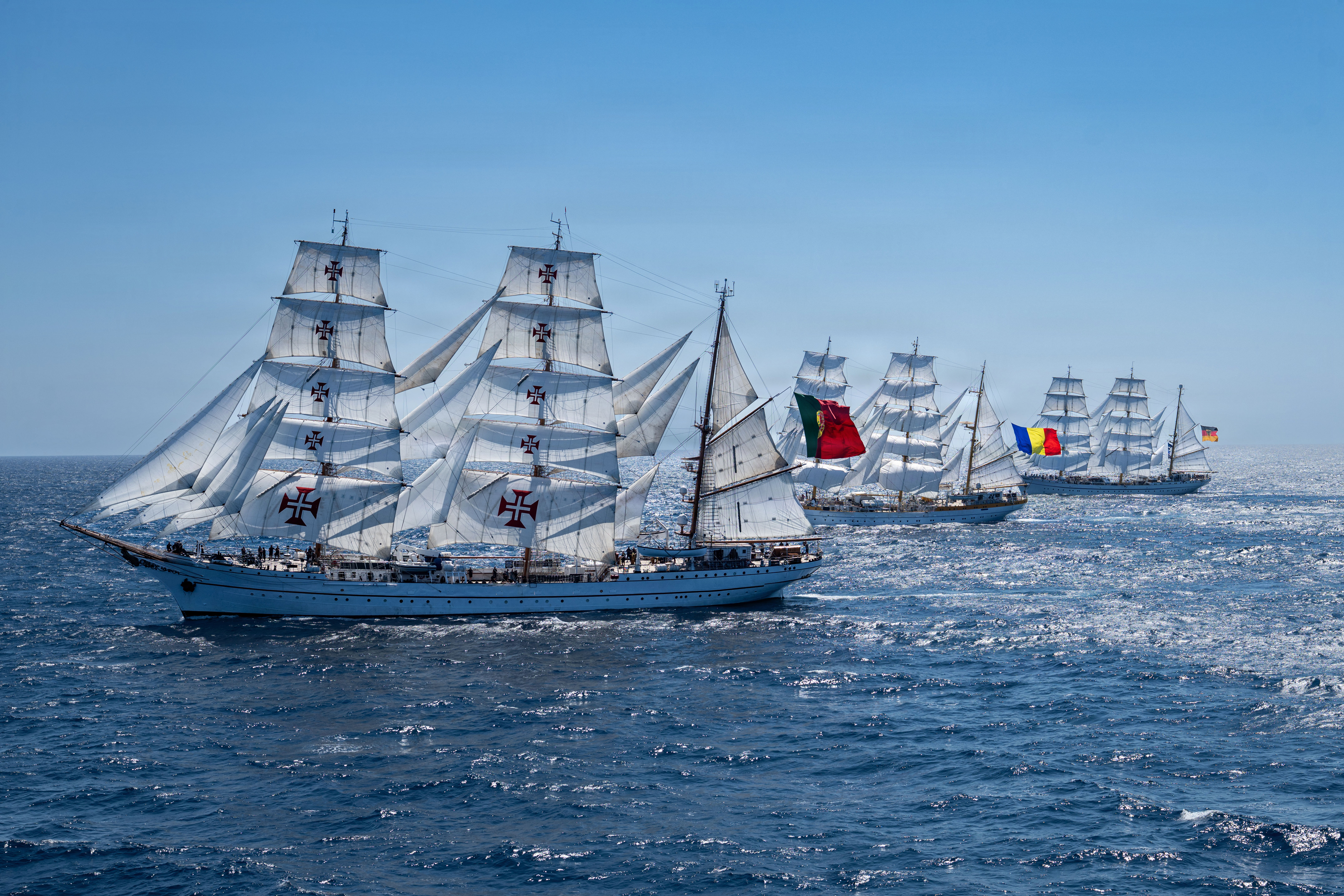
Mircea, Sagres, and Gorch Fock seen from the Eagle during the Five Sisters Cup
