= The Kitchen (2012 film) =

- Theatrical release poster
- Directed by: Ishai Setton
- Written by: Jim Beggarly
- Produced by: Emily Ting
- Starring: Laura Prepon; Bryan Greenberg; Dreama Walker; Matt Bush; Tate Ellington
- Cinematography: Josh Silfen
- Edited by: Mark Scovil
- Music by: Erik Desiderio
- Production company: Unbound Feet Productions
- Distributed by: Monterey Media
- Release dates: August 14, 2012 (GenArt Film Festival); March 14, 2013 (Los Angeles)
- Country: United States
- Language: English

The Kitchen is a 2012 American comedy-drama film directed by Ishai Setton and written by Jim Beggarly, starring Laura Prepon, Bryan Greenberg, and Dreama Walker. The film was shot in Los Angeles.

== Plot ==
The film takes place during the 30th birthday of Jennifer Parker, an art curator who has recently quit her job in order to open her own art gallery. The story is viewed entirely within the confines of the kitchen and adjoining dining room of Jennifer's home which she shares with her roommate and friend Kenny. Jennifer is not looking forward to her birthday party, which is being planned by Stan, her friend who has unrequited feelings for her. Her longtime boyfriend Paul has confessed to her the night before that he has been cheating on her with multiple women. Her younger sister Penny is pregnant from a casual fling and is scheduled to have an abortion later in the week.

As the party begins, Jennifer tells Penny she has invited Vladimir, an artist, in an attempt to poach him as the sole client of her gallery. As Jennifer goes to greet arriving guests, Kenny tells Penny he wishes to pursue a serious relationship with her after years of casual makeout sessions. Amanda and Kim, friends of Jennifer, arrive and Kim confesses that she slept with Paul and has purchased an expensive gift in order to apologize to Jennifer after telling her the truth. While Jennifer is discussing Paul with her best friend Pam, Kim and Amanda walk in and Kim awkwardly admits what happened, causing her to storm off. Pam then tells Amanda that she is aware Amanda is sleeping with Paul, as she and Paul are very old friends. Through conversation with friends Peter and Andre, Kenny finds out Penny is pregnant and says he wishes he could be the father.

Jennifer laments to Penny about her status in life but decides to have fun and enjoy her party. Afterward, Stan talks about Paul and Jennifer's breakup, and Penny tells him this is his opportunity to be with her. As Kim and Amanda reenter the kitchen, Paul knocks on the dining room window and asks Kim to retrieve his laptop that he left behind, as he does not want to cause a scene. He pretends that he is interested in dating her in order to convince her, only to proceed to finger and make out with Amanda as soon as Kim leaves the room. Stan walks in on the situation and notifies Penny, who sprays the Paul and Amanda with a fire extinguisher before throwing Paul's laptop out a window. After making out off-screen with Marco, an Italian exchange student who does not speak any English, Jennifer receives a call from Vladimir telling her that he will not be attending the party and has chosen to stay with Pace, leaving Jennifer worried about the fate of her art gallery.

Kim carries Paul into the dining room after he hurt his ankle climbing a fence to retrieve his laptop. Jennifer yells at him after learning Kim believes that she and Paul are now dating, as well as the fact that Paul is involved with Amanda. Jennifer asks why he confessed about cheating the day before her birthday, and he admits he thought someone would tell her, so he came clean in the hopes she would not be mad at him. Kim and Paul leave while Penny drags Jennifer away. As rival bands begin brawling in the backyard, things come to a head when Stan tries to get Jennifer to blow out the candles on her birthday cake, which has had the name smeared off since it was spelled "Jenni" instead of Jennifer, which she hates. Frustrated and upset, Jennifer pushes the cake into Stan's shirt off-screen. As he goes to clean up in the kitchen, Penny proceeds to mock Stan's obvious crush, causing Stan to harshly criticize Penny as an attention seeker and make fun of her scheduled abortion. Penny ends the party and Stan leaves in frustration.

The morning after, Kenny and Penny have finally gotten together and are choosing to keep the baby. As she begins to clean up the mess from the previous night, Jennifer finds the portfolio of Brent, an unstable photographer that Stan hired for the party, and finds that he has talent. She leaves him a message about showing his photos in her gallery and smiles optimistically about the future.

== Cast ==
- Laura Prepon as Jennifer
- Bryan Greenberg as Paul
- Dreama Walker as Penny
- Matt Bush as Stan
- Tate Ellington as Kenny
- Amber Stevens as Amanda
- Pepper Binkley as Kim
- Catherine Reitman as Pam
- Baron Vaughn as Andre
- Jillian Clare as Nikki
- Adam Chambers as Tony
- Brittany Finamore as Julia

== Release ==
=== Festivals ===
The Kitchen premiered at the GenArt Film Festival on August 14, 2012. That same year, the film was also selected to screen at the BendFilm Festival, the Tallgrass Film Festival, the Austin Film Festival, the Ft. Lauderdale Film Festival, and the Daytona Beach Film Festival.

=== Theatrical ===
The Kitchen had its Los Angeles theatrical premiere on March 14, 2013, at Laemmle's NoHo 7 in North Hollywood.
