= NMS Mircea (1882) =

Vessel of the Romanian Navy (1882–1944)

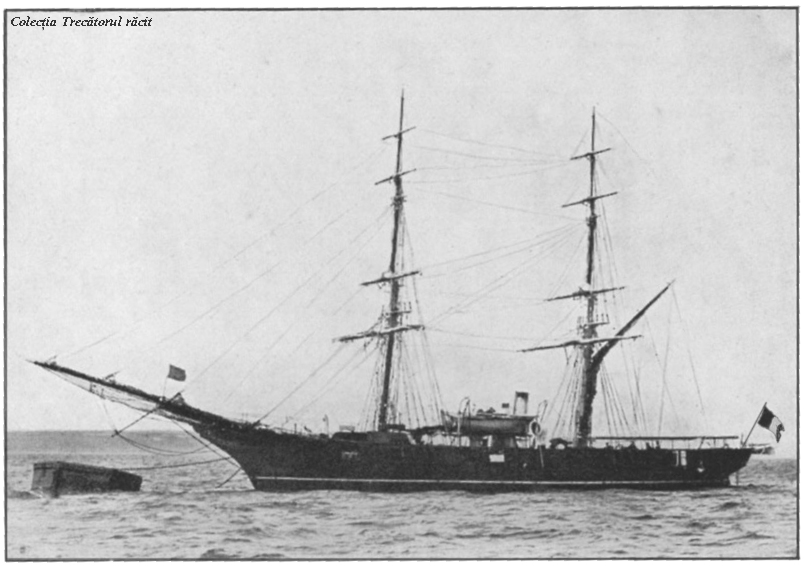
- Mircea in 1882

History

Romania
- Name: Mircea
- Namesake: Mircea the Elder
- Ordered: 1881
- Builder: Thames Iron Works, London
- Laid down: 1882
- Launched: 1882
- Completed: 1882
- Commissioned: 1882
- Out of service: 1939
- Fate: Sunk on 17 April 1944 for Soviet bomber training

General characteristics
- Type: Brig
- Displacement: 360 tons
- Length: 36 meters
- Propulsion: 160 hp auxiliary engine
- Speed: 6 knots
- Armament: 4 x machine guns

NMS Mircea was the second ship of the Romanian Navy's Black Sea Fleet, one of the Fleet's six founding warships and the only one of these vessels to remain in service until the Second World War. She was sunk during an air raid in April 1944.

== Construction and specifications ==
Mircea was built in 1882 by Thames Iron Works at Blackwall, England. A two-masted brig, she measured 36 meters (118 feet) in length and had a displacement of 360 tons. She was fitted with a 160 hp auxiliary engine which gave her a top speed of 6 knots. She had one funnel and was armed with four machine guns.

== Career ==
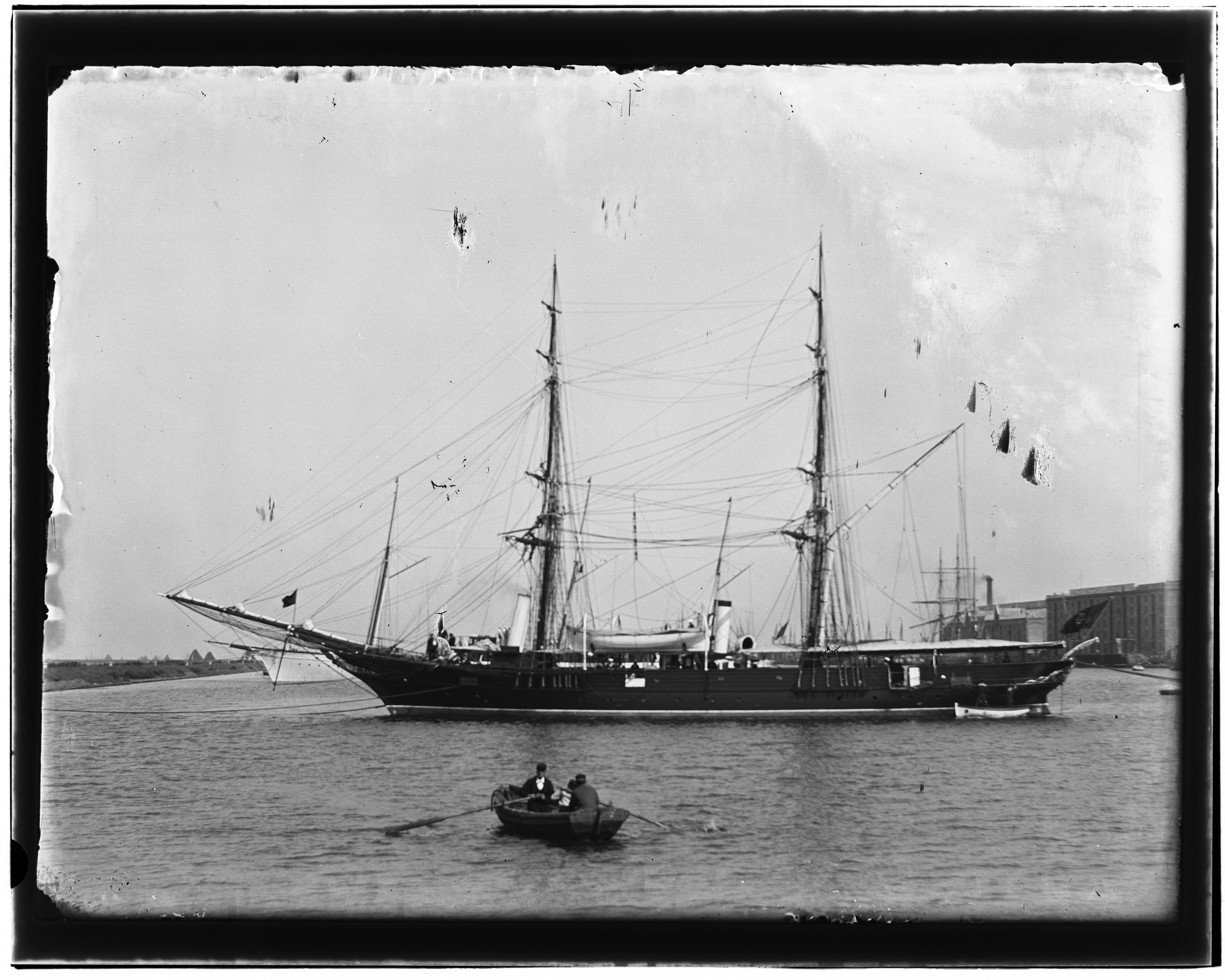
Mircea at the Eastern Docklands, Amsterdam in 1895

Mircea entered service in 1882 and became the second warship of the Romanian Black Sea fleet, after the gunboat Grivița, commissioned in 1880. The two vessels, together with the protected cruiser Elisabeta and the three Smeul-class torpedo boats, officially formed the Romanian Black Sea Fleet in 1890. In 1895, under the command of Major Ioan Coandă, the ship participated in the opening ceremony of the Kiel Canal together with the cruiser Elisabeta. She returned to Constanța on 21 August.

She served as a training ship during the First World War, although she was also rated as a composite gunboat.

She survived the war and was replaced in 1939 as the Romanian Navy's training ship by a modern, German-built yet unarmed three-masted bark, also named Mircea, which remains in service. The old brig was sunk at Galați by Soviet bombers on 17 April 1944.
