= MRB Productions =

Film and television production company

MRB Productions is a film and television production company focused on independent features, television shows, television specials, and commercials.

== Filmography ==
Year	Title	Type	Director	Starring
2026	The Evaluation	TV Series	Pat Lowry	Ettore Ewen (host)
2024	Escape from Extinction: Rewilding	Film	Matthew R. Brady	Meryl Streep (narrator)
2021	An Unexpected Christmas	Film	Michael Robison	Tyler Hynes, Bethany Joy Lentz
2020	Escape from Extinction	Film	Matthew R. Brady	Helen Mirren (narrator)
2018	Back to Life: The Torin Yater-Wallace Story	Film	Clayton Vila	Torin Yater-Wallace, Tony Goldwyn (narrator)
2017	All I Wish	Film	Susan Walter	Sharon Stone, Tony Goldwyn, Ellen Burstyn, Famke Janssen, Erica Ash, Caitlin Fitzgerald, Liza Lapira
2016	The Night Stalker	Film	Megan Griffiths	Lou Diamond Phillips, Bellamy Young
2012	Emanuel and the Truth About Fishes	Film	Francesca Gregorini	Jessica Biel, Kaya Scodelario, Alfred Molina
2011	Hero Dog Awards	TV Award Show	Mark "T-Man" Teitelman	Carson Kressley, Betty White, Paula Abdul, Peter Fonda, Mickey Rooney
2011	Just Dance Kids 2	Video game	Jeremy Haft	
2011	Grassroots	Film	Stephen Gyllenhaal	Jason Biggs, Joel David Moore, Lauren Ambrose, Cobie Smulders, Tom Arnold, Cedric the Entertainer
2011	The Confession	Web Series	Brad Mirman	John Hurt, Kiefer Sutherland
2009	X Games 3D: The Movie	Film	Steve Lawrence	Travis Pastrana, Ricky Carmichael, Shaun White
2007	Free Radio	TV series	Peter Siaggas	Lance Krall, Anna Vocino, Sarah Baker
2006	Ricky Bobby: Sports Century	Short	Neil Mandt	Will Ferrell, John C. Reilly
2006	Lance is a Jerk	Short	Mark "T-Man" Teitelman	Lance Armstrong, Larry Miller, Rainn Wilson
2006	I Trust You To Kill Me	Documentary	Manu Boyer	David Beste, Kiefer Sutherland, Rocco DeLuca and the Burden
2006	The Other Mall	TV movie		David Hornsby, Lisa Arturo, Ken Baumann, Ralph Garman
2005	Hoosiers II: Senior Year	Short	Mark "T-Man" Teitelman	Tadpole Triplett, Kathy Wagner

== Awards ==
=== 2013 ===
The Truth About Emanuel is chosen as an official Sundance Selection.

=== 2012 ===
The Confession (TV series) wins Webby for Best Drama.

The Confession (TV series) wins Webby for People's Voice Award.

=== 2011 ===
MRB was nominated for an Emmy for the 2011 NBA Draft Open featuring Adele.

MRB wins New York Festivals World Medal for 2011 NBA Draft Tease.

=== 2010 ===
MRB received two Emmy nominations for the 2010 NBA Draft Open featuring the music of Michael Buble.

=== 2008 ===
2008 International Broadcasting Award for 2007 NBA Finals Open

=== 2007 ===
In 2007, MRB Productions received six Sports Emmy nominations, including recognition of MRB Directors Mark Teitelman and Rico Labbe. MRB scored all four nominations in the "Outstanding Production Design/Art Direction" category. All four nominated pieces were produced in part by MRB Productions, which guarantees a win in the category. The nominated pieces include:

- The 2006 NFL Draft on ESPN directed by Rico Labbe
- Monday Night Football teases for the Washington Redskins vs. Minnesota Vikings game and the Green Bay Packers vs. Philadelphia Eagles game both on ESPN
- Monday Night Football transformation open featuring Ben Stiller on ESPN
- NBA Finals tease open on ABC directed by Mark Teitelman

MRB also received two nominations in another category, "Outstanding Open/Tease" which include:

- Super Bowl XL piece The Places You Will Go featuring Harrison Ford on ABC directed by Mark Teitelman and produced by Matt Brady
- NBA Basketball Hall of Fame piece on ABC directed by Mark Teitelman and produced by Matt Brady, which won the Emmy

=== 2004 ===
MRB was nominated for three Emmy awards in 2004 for their Monday Night Football Opens and won the Emmy for "Outstanding Live Sports Series" for Monday Night Football.

=== 2003 ===
The National Academy of Television Arts & Sciences nominated MRB Productions for three Emmy Awards in 2003, including the award for "Outstanding Opening/Tease" with Monday Night Football’s The Pitch featuring Dennis Hopper and won an Emmy for "Outstanding Production Design/Art Direction" for their Monday Night Football tease.
