= Party Animal =

Party Animal(s) may refer to:

== Music ==
- Party Animals (music group), a Dutch pop-gabber group
- Party Animals (album), by Turbonegro, 2005
- "Party Animal", a song by James Ingram from It's Your Night
- "Party Animal", a song by K-Town Clan entered in the ABU Radio Song Festival 2012
- "Party Animal", a song by M.O.D. from Surfin' M.O.D.
- "Party Animal", a song by Timati from SWAGG
- "Party Animal" or "Gyal You a Party Animal", a song by Charly Black

== Film ==
- The Party Animal, a 1984 comedy directed by David Beaird
- Party Animals, a 2003 short film by Grady Cooper
- Party Animals (film), a 2026 Indian Hindi-language comedy

== Television ==
- Party Animals (TV series), a 2007 British drama series
- Party Animals, a Scottish game show presented by Bryan Burnett

=== Episodes ===
- "Party Animal" (Happy Tree Friends)
- "Party Animal" (That's So Raven)
- "Party Animals" (Rugrats)
- "Party Animals" (Shaun the Sheep)
- "Party Animal", of Palak Pe Jhalak, the Indian adaptation of That's So Raven

== Video games ==
- Party Animals (video game), a multiplayer brawler game
- Viva Piñata: Party Animals, a 2007 video game

== See also ==
- Savannah Party Animals, a Banana Ball Championship League team
