= Whole World Theatre =

Coordinates: 33°47′16″N 84°23′22″W

Whole World Theatre logo

The Whole World Theatre is an improvisational theatre located in Atlanta, Georgia.

Whole World Theatre (WWT) is a non-profit theatre company that began in Atlanta, Georgia in late 1993, when David Webster began teaching a group of student actors whom he would train to become the hottest improv company in town. Jennifer Horne and David Webster were co-founding members.

The original students of Whole World Theatre performed their first show in front of 25 people in September 1994. Specializing in experiential improv and unconventional scripted works, and using a unique approach to improv, which put more emphasis on acting, character and atmosphere than on cheap laughs, Webster wrote and directed original ground breaking pieces such as, Blood Bath Bingo and Pimps, Queens, and Dope Fiends. Webster also produced scripted works included, Balm in Gillead, Bitches, Women Behind Bars, Four Dogs and a Bone and The House of Yes, among many others.

In June 1995, Jennifer Horne and David Webster spent their honeymoon money to open Whole World Theatre at their current location at 1214 Spring Street in mid-town Atlanta. As their popularity grew, the cast of Whole World Theatre were given the opportunity to produce their live improv comedy show for television when Webster sold the show to television. "Whole World Comedy" - Whole World's premier TV show - helped to launch the southern based Turner South Network.

David Webster taught every actor at Whole World Theater until 2001. He wrote, directed and emceed every show for over 1000 shows. He won several awards including an Emmy award for writing.

In 2003, the managing director, Emily Reily Russell, created a youth summer camp program and an improvisational acting program for teens and young adults at Whole World Theatre that still exists to this day. Many of the graduates of this program have entered the "Performance Ready Group" that hosts a more family oriented show the first Saturday of every month November through May. The Performance Ready Group is directed and mentored by Assistant Artistic Director, Eric Goins. Russell, in conjunction with Callanwolde Fine Arts Center and The Starlight Starbright Foundation has also created "Improv in Dialysis." Providing monthly improvisational acting workshops to patients and their families at Egleston Children's Hospital in Atlanta.

Lance Krall, one of Webster's original students, eventually moved to Hollywood and went on to produce his own television show, The Lance Krall Show, which aired Spike TV, and Free Radio, which aired on Vh1. Lance has hired several alumni from Whole World Theatre to guest star in his projects.

In 2004, Webster moved on to write and direct independent movies and Jennifer Horne moved on to begin her own improv troupe in Charlottesville, Va. That same year, a complete change in management occurred at Whole World Theatre.

In 2004, Chip Powell became Artistic Director of Whole World Theatre. The Company continues to perform improv shows and remains one of Atlanta's most successful theater companies. Under Powell's leadership the company has produced Improv in the Park: an annual free improv show in Atlanta's Piedmont Park and Central Park at Atlantic Station. Improv in the Park was voted "Best Outdoor Event" by Creative Loafing. Powell also went on to launch Whole World's 3rd Space Theatre by Producing and Directing scripted works such as Sordid Lives and Southern Baptist Sissies by Del Shores.

In 2005, the theatre started a television show for a network called MAV TV and is currently broadcast in over 200,000 homes across the U.S. The show features Whole World's Improv Comedy and is geared towards a more mature audience.
