= Sarah Baker (actress) =

American actress and comedian

- Occupations: Actress; comedian
- Years active: 2002–present

Sarah Baker is an American actress and comedian. She is best known for her roles on TV including The Kominsky Method, which earned her three SAG Award Nominations, as well as Louie, which earned her a Critics' Choice Television Award Nomination. On film, she has appeared in movies like The Campaign and Mascots. She also works in animation, with recurring roles on Bob's Burgers and The Great North.

== Life and career ==
Baker honed her improvisational and sketch comedy skills at The Groundlings.

In 2012, Baker appeared in the comedy The Campaign as Mitzi Huggins, wife of Zach Galifianakis' congressional candidate, along with Will Ferrell. At the time, the Jay Roach-directed film was the highest grossing political-campaign themed movie in North America. In 2014, she played Becky in Tammy, starring Melissa McCarthy, and directed by Ben Falcone. Baker has also appeared as Pamela Lowi in The Good Lie, about the Lost Boys of Sudan, which was directed by Philippe Falardeau (director of the Oscar-nominated Monsieur Lazhar). In 2015, she appeared in Barry Levinson's Rock the Kasbah, alongside Bill Murray.

In 2016, she was in a number of films, including Christopher Guest's Mascots where she played Mindy Murray, aka Tammy the Turtle. Other movies released in 2016 include The Meddler, starring Susan Sarandon and directed by Lorene Scafaria, where Baker played Elaine. Baker also appeared opposite Shirley MacLaine in The Last Word and in the film adaptation of the acclaimed Speech & Debate, playing Ms. Riggi. In 2018, she appeared as Gildred in Melissa McCarthy's Life of the Party, and co-starred in Paul Feig's A Simple Favor.

On television, Baker was seen as series regular Sonia on the NBC comedy Go On, starring Matthew Perry, as a support group member dealing with the loss of her cat. In 2017, she played the recurring role of Thea Cunningham on HBO's limited series Big Little Lies, based on the popular book of the same name.

She also appeared as Vanessa on the FX show Louie; this performance was nominated for the Critics' Choice Television Award for Best Guest Performer in a Comedy Series. Entertainment Weekly included the performance in its "50 Best TV Scenes" of 2014, and later nominated the performance for one of their annual "EWwy Awards." The performance was included on numerous year-end "best of" lists for 2014, including NPR's "50 Wonderful Things from 2014". This role later led to Baker's performance as Trinity on Pamela Adlon's Better Things in 2016, in an episode written by Adlon and Louis CK.

Other TV appearances have included guest and recurring roles on shows such as A to Z, Bob's Burgers, Bones, Brooklyn Nine-Nine, The Crazy Ones, Ghosted, Graves, Great News, In the Motherhood, Kath & Kim, Key & Peele, Mike & Molly, Modern Family, New Girl, The Office (American version), Santa Clarita Diet, Sean Saves the World, as well as her favorite guest appearance on a TV show, Comedy Bang! Bang! In 2018, Baker appeared in the acclaimed "Kill All Others" episode of Philip K. Dick's Electric Dreams, alongside Mel Rodriguez. Baker appears in the DVD/Blu-ray bonus scenes of the hit comedy Bridesmaids, as a nurse arguing with an injured Paul Rudd. Online, she was seen as Arabella, faithful servant to Megan Mullally in the Funny or Die video Home for Actresses.

She played the school librarian, Ms. Hutchins, in all seven seasons of the Netflix series Young Sheldon which ran from 2017 to 2024. Baker is a regular in the Netflix series The Kominsky Method, alongside Michael Douglas and Alan Arkin as Mindy, Douglas' character's daughter. After winning a Golden Globe for Best Comedy Series, the show was renewed for a second season in January 2019. A third and final season of the show was announced in 2020, shortly before it was nominated for an Emmy for Best Comedy Series.

== Filmography ==
=== Film ===
| Year | Title | Role | Notes |
|---|---|---|---|
| 2002 | Sweet Home Alabama | Dix | |
| 2011 | Bridesmaids | Skating Rink Nurse | |
| 2011 | Home for Actresses | Arabella | Short film |
| 2012 | The Campaign | Mitzi Huggins | |
| 2014 | The Good Lie | Pamela | |
| 2014 | Tammy | Becky | |
| 2015 | Rock the Kasbah | Maureen | |
| 2016 | The Meddler | Elaine | |
| 2016 | Brother Nature | Shannon | |
| 2016 | Mascots | Mindy Murray | |
| 2017 | The Last Word | Zoe | |
| 2017 | Speech & Debate | Ms. Riggi | |
| 2018 | Life of the Party | Gildred | |
| 2018 | A Simple Favor | Maryanne Chelkowsky | |
| 2018 | Smallfoot | Soozie's Mom (voice) | |
| 2019 | The Death of Dick Long | Officer Dudley | |
| 2020 | Superintelligence | Emily | |
| 2021 | Thunder Force | Sarah | |
| 2023 | Paint | Lady in the Window | |
| 2026 | Loves Company | Shoney | |

=== Television ===
| Year | Title | Role | Notes |
|---|---|---|---|
| 2005 | The Lance Krall Show | Various | Main cast |
| 2008 | Kath & Kim | Marjorie | Episode: "Sacrifice" |
| 2008–2009 | Free Radio | Emo Sarah | Main cast |
| 2009 | In the Motherhood | Doris | Episodes: "Vacation" and "In Sickness and in Health" |
| 2010 | The Office | Josie | Episode: "The Delivery" |
| 2010 | Good Luck Charlie | Carla | Episode: "Charlie Is 1" |
| 2011 | In Gayle We Trust | Smith | 10 webisodes |
| 2011 | Bones | Kim | Episode: "The Truth in the Myth" |
| 2012, 2017–2018 | Modern Family | Twins' Mom | Episode: "Disneyland" |
| 2012, 2017–2018 | Modern Family | Shirl Chambers | Episodes: "Basketball" and "In Your Head" |
| 2012–2013 | Go On | Sonia | Recurring episodes 1–13; main cast episode 14 onwards |
| 2013 | Sean Saves the World | Tippy | Episode: "Best Friends for Never" |
| 2014 | The Crazy Ones | Jean | Episode: "Love Sucks" |
| 2014 | Louie | Vanessa | Episode: "So Did the Fat Lady" |
| 2014 | Last Week Tonight with John Oliver | Allison | Episode: "State Legislatures and ALEC" |
| 2014–2026 | Bob's Burgers | Rena, Ms. Selbo, Bethany, Jacob, Terry (voice) | 12 episodes |
| 2015 | A to Z | Jennifer | Episode: "J Is for Jan Vaughan" |
| 2015 | Mike & Molly | Stacey | Episode: "The Last Temptation of Mike" |
| 2015 | Other Space | Alien | 3 episodes |
| 2015 | Key & Peele | Barista | Episode: "MC Mom" |
| 2015 | Married | Mindy | Episode: "Mother's Day" |
| 2015 | Fresh Off the Boat | Gator Carol | Episode: "Family Business Trip" |
| 2015 | Your Pretty Face Is Going to Hell | Wendy | Episode: "Heaven" |
| 2015 | Mike Tyson Mysteries | Molly Gibson (voice) | Episode: "A Plaintive Wail" |
| 2015–2016 | TripTank | Various voices | 3 episodes |
| 2016 | Workaholics | Sara | Episode: "Death of a Salesdude" |
| 2016 | Idiotsitter | Virginia | Episodes: "Funeral" and "Finale" |
| 2016 | Grace and Frankie | Gretchen | Episode: "The Anchor" |
| 2016 | Goliath | Lily Suzanne Daniels | Episodes: "Line of Fire" and "Beauty and the Beast" |
| 2016 | Better Things | Trinity | Episode: "Duke's Chorus" |
| 2016 | Comedy Bang! Bang! | Al's Mom | Episode: "Allison Janney Wears a Chambray Western Shirt and Suede Fringe Boots" |
| 2017 | Sofia the First | Woman in the Portrait (voice) | Episode: "Hexley Hall" |
| 2017 | Big Little Lies | Thea Cunningham | 6 episodes |
| 2017 | Foursome | Principal Slacks | Episode: "The Big Finish" |
| 2017 | Dr. Ken | Kylie | Episode: "Ken's Professor" |
| 2017 | Great News | Joyce Vickley | Episodes: "Bear Attack", "War Is Hell", "Sensitivity Training" |
| 2017–2018 | Brooklyn Nine-Nine | Kylie | Episodes: "Chasing Amy", "Bachelor/ette Party" |
| 2017 | Ghosted | Deb | Episode: "Pilot" |
| 2017 | Philip K. Dick's Electric Dreams | Maggie Noyce | Episode: "Kill All Others" |
| 2017 | Graves | Becky Keegan | Episodes: "Something Left to Love", "All the King's Horses" |
| 2017–2024 | Young Sheldon | Ms. Sheryl Hutchins | Recurring; 14 episodes |
| 2018 | Santa Clarita Diet | Ruby Sanders | Episode: "Suspicious Objects" |
| 2018 | New Girl | Judith | Episode: "Mario" |
| 2018 | I Feel Bad | Anna Mae | Episode: "I Need My Mom" |
| 2018–2021 | The Kominsky Method | Mindy Kominsky | Main role |
| 2019–2020 | Harvey Girls Forever! | Irona (voice) | 8 episodes |
| 2019 | Life in Pieces | Eve | Episode: "Four Short Fairy Tales" |
| 2020 | The Conners | Helen | Episode: "Mud Turtles, A Good Steak and One Man in a Tub" |
| 2020 | Will & Grace | Cathy | Episode: "New Crib" |
| 2021 | Bless the Harts | Pastor Joanne (voice) | Episode: "Easter's 11" |
| 2021–2025 | The Great North | Chief Edna, Mary, Wine Woman (voice) | 17 episodes |
| 2022 | The Goldbergs | Martha | Episode: "Another Turkey in the Trot" |
| 2024 | Night Court | Tiff | Episode: "A Crime of Fashion" |
| 2024 | Curb Your Enthusiasm | Grossbard's Nanny | Episode: "The Dream Scheme" |
| 2025-2026 | Georgie & Mandy's First Marriage | Ms. Hutchins | 2 episodes |

== Awards and nominations ==
| Year | Award | Category | Nominated work | Result |
|---|---|---|---|---|
| 2014 | 4th Critics' Choice Television Awards | Best Guest Performer in a Comedy Series | Louie | Nominated |
| 2014 | 11th Gold Derby Awards | Best Comedy Guest Actress | Louie | Nominated |
| 2018 | 25th Screen Actors Guild Awards | Outstanding Performance by an Ensemble in a Comedy Series | The Kominsky Method | Nominated |
| 2019 | 26th Screen Actors Guild Awards | Outstanding Performance by an Ensemble in a Comedy Series | The Kominsky Method | Nominated |
| 2022 | 28th Screen Actors Guild Awards | Outstanding Performance by an Ensemble in a Comedy Series | The Kominsky Method | Nominated |
