= I Trust You to Kill Me =

I Trust You to Kill Me may refer to:

- I Trust You to Kill Me (film), a 2006 documentary featuring Rocco DeLuca and the Burden and Canadian actor Kiefer Sutherland
- I Trust You to Kill Me (album), the debut album by Rocco DeLuca and the Burden
