= Lynne Adams =

American actress and writer

- Born: 1945 or 1946 (age 80–81)
- Occupations: Actress, radio scriptwriter
- Relatives: Brooke Adams (sister); Tony Shalhoub (brother-in-law)

Lynne Adams (born 1945 or 1946) is an American actress and writer.

== Early years ==
Adams is the daughter of Rosalind (née Gould), an actress, and Robert K. Adams, a producer, actor (noted for his appearances on The Goldbergs and Your Family and Mine), and former vice president of CBS, as well as a descendant of presidents John Adams and John Quincy Adams. She is the older sister of actress Brooke Adams. She graduated from the Professional Children's School in New York City in 1965.

== Career ==
Adams was an apprentice in theaters for eight years, learning skills that included building scenery, managing ticket sales, and operating a lighting board. She debuted as a professional actress in a 1955 production of Brigadoon at the Flint Musical Tent in Flint, Michigan.

Adams played the role of Leslie Jackson Bauer Norris Bauer from 1966 to 1971 and again from August 1973 to June 1976 on The Guiding Light. She was the second generation in her family to act on the program; both her parents had roles in the radio incarnation in the 1940s. She also appeared on The Secret Storm in the role of Amy Kincaid from September 1971 to May 1973.

Adams has written and produced a number of stage productions, including Two Faced, upon which the feature film Made-Up was based. Adams wrote and produced Made-Up, co-starring her younger sister and brother-in-law, Brooke Adams and Tony Shalhoub, as well as Eva Amurri, Gary Sinise and Lance Krall.

== Filmography ==
Film
| Year | Title | Role |
|---|---|---|
| 1996 | Grace of My Heart | Kindly Nurse |
| 2002 | Made-Up | Kate James |
| 2012 | A Deadly Obsession | Alice Hollander |
| 2014 | Betrayed | Kathy |

Television
| Year | Title | Role | Notes |
|---|---|---|---|
| 1966–71, 1973–76 | The Guiding Light | Leslie Jackson Bauer Norris Bauer, R.N. #1 | |
| 1971–73 | The Secret Storm | Amy Ames Britton Kincaid #4 | |
| 1994 | Frasier | Nurse | episode "Burying a Grudge" |
