= The Legend of Lucy Keyes =

- Film poster
- Directed by: John Stimpson
- Written by: John Stimpson
- Produced by: Tim Disney; Marc Toberoff; Bill Haney; John MacNeil; Mark Donadio; J. Todd Harris; Miriam Marcus
- Starring: Julie Delpy; Justin Theroux; Brooke Adams; Mark Boone Jr.
- Edited by: Joel Plotch; John Stimpson
- Music by: Ed Grenga
- Release date: February 2006 (Santa Barbara)

The Legend of Lucy Keyes is a 2006 suspense mystery film directed and written by John Stimpson, and starring Julie Delpy, Justin Theroux and Brooke Adams. The film premiered at the 2006 Santa Barbara Film Festival.

== Summary ==
After losing their youngest daughter Anna (Madeline O'Brian), Guy Cooley (Justin Theroux) moves to an old farm in Princeton with his wife Jeanne Cooley (Julie Delpy) and their two daughters, Molly and Lucy, to build eight windmills to generate clean power to the city. He was hired by a local named Samantha Porter (Brooke Adams), who, with her relative Jonas Dodd (Mark Boone Junior), owns the lands in the woods where the facility will be built. The Cooley family experiences a cold reception in town, and while voting for the approval of the project, an old woman named Gretchen Caswell (Jamie Donnelly) votes against the construction (along with several other people) and mentions the historic importance of the spot and the name of Martha. Jeanne researches and discovers that two hundred and fifty years ago, a girl called Lucy Keyes got lost in the woods and in spite of the efforts of her mother Martha Keyes and the locals, she was never found. When the ghost of Martha comes to the fields around their property calling for Lucy, Jeanne realizes that the legend is true and that there are many hidden secrets in that location. The mom found out that Lucy died and her body was in the woods. Now that they're all dead, people say that they can still hear the mom calling for Lucy. Jeanne's Lucy snoops around the neighborhood because she sees Lucy Keyes and wants to help her. She almost ends up like Lucy Keyes when she helps Jeanne discover the true story of how Lucy Keyes disappeared.

== Cast ==
- Julie Delpy as Jeanne Cooley
- Justin Theroux as Guy Cooley
- Brooke Adams as Samantha Porter
- Mark Boone Jr. as Jonas Dodd
- Jamie Donnelly as Gretchen Caswell
- Michele Greene as Sheila Travers
- Cassidy Hinkle as Lucy Cooley
- Kathleen Regan as Molly Cooley
- Tom Kemp as Bill Kemper
- Ken Cheeseman as Bud Travers
- Anna Friedman as Lucy Keyes
- Rachel Harker as Martha Keyes
- David Ian as Eli Farnum
- Charlie Broderick as Bob Greenwood
- Jillian Wheeler as Anna Keyes
- Madeline O'Brien as Anna Cooley
- Sarah Newhouse as Mary Sawyer
- Elizabeth Duff as Librarian
- Frank T. Wells as Mechanic
- Bates Wilder as Deputy Officer
- Jim Spencer as Native American

== Production ==
Writer/Director John Stimpson moved to Princeton, Massachusetts and learned about the legend of Lucy Keyes. Lucy Keyes disappeared from the Wachusett woods on April 14, 1755. To this day nobody knows what happened to her. The legend spurred Stimpson to write and direct a film based on the events.

== Reception ==
Variety said of the film "Mild scares rustle the autumnal mood of 'The Legend of Lucy Keyes,' a modest New England psychological horror tale that could easily be dubbed 'Amityville Jr.'"
