= The Fight (The Office) =

- The Office episode
- Episode no.: Season 2 Episode 6
- Directed by: Ken Kwapis
- Written by: Gene Stupnitsky; Lee Eisenberg
- Cinematography by: Randall Einhorn
- Editing by: Dean Holland
- Production code: 2007
- Original air date: November 1, 2005
- Running time: 22 minutes

Guest appearances
- Lance Krall as Ira Glicksberg; Leslie David Baker as Stanley Hudson; Brian Baumgartner as Kevin Malone; Kate Flannery as Meredith Palmer; Mindy Kaling as Kelly Kapoor; Angela Kinsey as Angela Martin; Paul Lieberstein as Toby Flenderson; Oscar Nunez as Oscar Martinez; Phyllis Smith as Phyllis Lapin

Episode chronology
← Previous "Halloween"	Next → "The Client"
- The Office (American season 2)

"The Fight" is the sixth episode of the second season of the television series The Office and the show's twelfth episode overall. It was written by Gene Stupnitsky and Lee Eisenberg and directed by Ken Kwapis. It originally aired on November 1, 2005, on NBC. "The Fight" guest starred Lance Krall, who played the part of Dwight's sensei, Ira.

The series depicts the everyday lives of office employees in the Scranton, Pennsylvania branch of the fictional Dunder Mifflin Paper Company. In this episode, Michael Scott (Steve Carell), after being embarrassed by Dwight Schrute's (Rainn Wilson) superior fighting skills, engages in a karate match with Dwight during lunch. Meanwhile, Jim Halpert's (John Krasinski) flirting with Pam Beesly (Jenna Fischer) goes too far.

"The Fight" was known as "Karate" and "The Dojo" by members of the cast and crew due to many of the scenes featuring the titular fight. Several of the cast members of the show—recurring and starring—had martial arts experience. The episode contained several cultural references, with many referring to popular fighting-related movies and television shows. "The Fight" received largely positive reviews from critics. The episode earned a Nielsen rating of 3.9 in the 18–49 demographic and was viewed by 7.9 million viewers.

== Synopsis ==
In the cold open, Dwight Schrute arrives at the office to find his desk has been moved into the men's bathroom, presumably by Jim Halpert. Although initially angry, he quickly simmers down upon finding the desk, even staying in the bathroom to politely field a work-related phone call from Jim.

It is the one day of the year on which Michael Scott has three separate sets of paperwork due at the same time. To procrastinate, Michael makes Ryan Howard update emergency contact information of the staff. When Michael gets Ryan's cell phone number, he constantly prank calls Ryan with crude impersonations of famous people.

Jim learns Dwight is a purple belt karate student after Dwight's sensei calls him at the office. Seeing the opportunity for comic mischief, he goads Michael and Dwight into an office fight to prove their respective prowess. Dwight incapacitates Michael with two stomach blows. Jim promises to buy Pam Beesly a bag of chips in exchange for her salting Michael's wounded ego by voicing respect for Dwight's fighting abilities, leading to a lunchtime rematch between Dwight and Michael at Dwight's dojo. Wanting witnesses for his win, Michael invites nearly all the office staff. Jim accidentally goes too far when horsing around with Pam, picking her up and lifting her shirt halfway off, and she shuts him down when their co-workers take notice.

The match degenerates into childish horseplay, and Michael emerges victorious, which leads to Dwight changing his emergency contact from Michael to "The Hospital". At the end of the day, Michael has Toby Flenderson, Angela Martin, and Stanley Hudson complete his workload, forging his signature on the documents, and promotes Dwight from his lowly "Assistant to the Regional Manager" position to his dream position: "Assistant Regional Manager" (although he warns Dwight not to publicize the promotion).

On the way out, Jim gives Pam the bag of chips he owed her without either of them looking at each other.

== Production ==
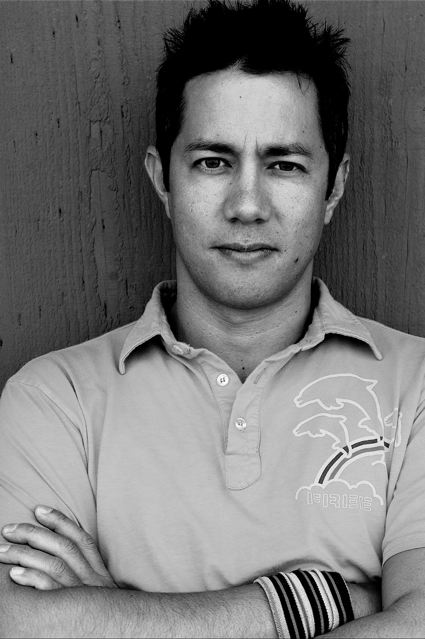
Actor and comedian Lance Krall guest starred in the episode.

"The Fight" was written by Gene Stupnitsky and Lee Eisenberg, while Ken Kwapis served as the episode's director. The episode was the first entry of the series to be written by Stupnitsky and Eisenberg; it was also Kwapis' fifth episode directed. The episode guest starred comedian and actor Lance Krall, who portrayed Dwight's sensei, Ira. B. J. Novak, who portrays Ryan Howard in the series, noted that when the episode was being filmed, the majority of the cast and crew called it "'Karate', or 'The Dojo', since the most memorable scenes involve a karate fight." Novak explained that the episode centered on the effects of procrastination "carried to the nth degree". However, he noted that it was more memorable as "the episode in which Steve Carell and Rainn Wilson jump-kick each other in public to try to prove a point."

Several of the cast members had experience in martial arts prior to the filming of the episode. Rainn Wilson used to study karate and is a certified yellow belt. Krall is a black belt in Taekwondo and was nationally ranked. One of the background actresses who played a student in Dwight's class was actually a black belt, but was forced to wear a white belt; ultimately, she was unhappy about having to hide her ability. Eventually, she vented her frustration by "practically knock[ing] Rainn over when she kicked the pad he was holding", which was included in the episode. During the filming of the episode, the protective piece of headgear that Wilson wore actually cut him.

During the filming of many scenes in the episode, the cast and crew members kept breaking character and laughing. Jenna Fischer recalls that she had to film the scene where Ryan reveals that he is working on emergency contacts "about 20 times". In addition, Fischer noted that she and John Krasinski kept laughing "about a million times" during the kitchen confrontation between Michael and Dwight. During the dojo scenes, cinematographer Randall Einhorn and Krall "lost it" when Michael pinned down Dwight. In fact, shots of Krall laughing made it into the closing scene of the episode.

The season two DVDs contain a number of deleted scenes from this episode. Notable cut scenes include Dwight's sensei rebuking Dwight for bringing his pager into the dojo, Angela trying to figure out who ate her pudding, and the sensei revealing that his senpai is not Dwight but a pre-adolescent girl named Alyssa.

== Cultural references ==
During the game of "phone tag", Michael impersonates Michael Jackson, Tito Jackson, Mike Tyson, and Saddam Hussein. In addition, several songs are alluded to. Michael sings "I don't want to work/I just want to bang on this mug all day" to the tune of "Bang the Drum All Day" by Todd Rundgren. Jim alludes to the Jets, one of the rival street gangs in the musical West Side Story, by quoting the lyrics "When you're a Jet, you're a Jet all the way", as well as snapping his fingers in the same way as the gang members. Several popular quotes are misused in the episode: Michael consistently misuses the phrase "Catch-22", and Dwight mistakes the phrase "tit for tat" as "tit for tit".

Several noted films are referenced in the episode. After grabbing Dwight in a sleeper hold, Michael nonsensically shouts out "Bedtime for Bonzo". Michael notes that Dwight cried at the end of Armageddon. Michael's line "You talkin' to me?" is a line performed by Robert De Niro in the movie Taxi Driver. Michael mis-attributes it to Al Pacino in Raging Bull, a film Pacino did not appear in. The Karate Kid franchise is referenced two separate times. Michael notes that Dwight is the "Hilary Swank version", a reference to The Next Karate Kid, the fourth movie in the Karate Kid series, starring Swank as the first female student of sensei Miyagi. Kevin later tells Dwight to "sweep the leg", a quote from the original movie The Karate Kid. The episode also contains several television references. Jim mocks Pam by doubting her status as an Ultimate Fighter; The Ultimate Fighter is a reality television series in the form of a martial arts competition. Michael turns the insult "queer" into a reference to Queer Eye for the Straight Guy, a make-over reality television program featuring five openly gay men dispensing fashion and style advice.

== Reception ==
"The Fight" originally aired on NBC in the United States on November 1, 2005. The episode was viewed by 7.9 million viewers and received a 3.9 rating/9% share among adults between the ages of 18 and 49. This means that it was seen by 3.9% of all 18- to 49-year-olds, and 9% of all 18- to 49-year-olds watching television at the time of the broadcast. An encore presentation of the episode, on April 25, 2006, received 3.0 rating/8% share and retained 91% of its lead in "My Name Is Earl" viewership. The encore presentation was viewed by over 6.1 million viewers.

Erik Adams of The A.V. Club awarded the episode a "B", and wrote that he enjoyed the way the important elements of the episode go "unspoken: Jim composes an apology email but doesn’t send it; the way the spectators are blocked during the main event at the dojo, there’s practically an entire office standing between Krasinski and Jenna Fischer." Adams also enjoyed the way the episode wrote Pam's reaction, noting "is she generally uncomfortable, is she afraid of what Meredith might assume, or is she afraid of her own feelings?"

Critical reception to the episode was largely positive. "Miss Alli" from Television Without Pity gave the episode a positive review and rated it an A−. Francis Rizzo III from DVD Talk called the episode "classic", and praised the performance of Rainn Wilson as Dwight. He noted that the episode, along with several others, "wouldn't be nearly as entertaining" without his character. TV Fanatic reviewed several quotes from "The Fight", and rated Michael's "Would I rather be feared or loved?" soliloquy and Michael's confession that Dwight cried at the end of Armageddon 5 out of 5. In 2006, Jenna Fischer said that the episode's cold opening, featuring Jim moving Dwight's desk into the bathroom, was her favorite prank on the show.
