= List of The Joe Schmo Show episodes =

The Joe Schmo Show is an American reality television hoax show created by Paul Wernick and Rhett Reese. The series premiered in the United States on Spike on September 2, 2003. The show's third season premiered on January 8, 2013. The show's fourth season premiered on January 21, 2025.

== Series overview ==
Season	Title of Fake Show	Episodes	Originally released		
Season	Title of Fake Show	Episodes	First released	Last released	Network
1	Lap of Luxury	10	September 2, 2003	October 28, 2003	Spike
2	Last Chance for Love	9	June 15, 2004	August 10, 2004	Spike
3	The Full Bounty	10	January 8, 2013	March 5, 2013	Spike
4	The GOAT	10	January 21, 2025	March 25, 2025	TBS

== Episodes ==
=== Season 1 (2003) ===
No. overall	No. in season	Title	Original release date
1	1	"Episode 1"	September 2, 2003
2	2	"Episode 2"	September 2, 2003
3	3	"Episode 3"	September 9, 2003
4	4	"Episode 4"	September 16, 2003
5	5	"Episode 5"	September 23, 2003
6	6	"Episode 6"	September 30, 2003
7	7	"Episode 7"	October 7, 2003
8	8	"Episode 8"	October 14, 2003
9	9	"Episode 9"	October 28, 2003
10	10	"The Aftermath"	October 28, 2003

=== Season 2 (2004): Joe Schmo 2 ===
No. overall	No. in season	Title	Original release date
11	1	"On with the Schmo"	June 15, 2004
12	2	"A Bottle of Red, a Bottle of White"	June 22, 2004
13	3	"The Crisis"	June 28, 2004
14	4	"Guess Who's Coming to Dinner"	July 5, 2004
15	5	"Porked and Beans"	July 12, 2004
16	6	"Requiem for a Frog"	July 19, 2004
17	7	"Cruiser"	July 26, 2004
18	8	"T.J. Needs T.P."	August 2, 2004
19	9	"Finale"	August 10, 2004

=== Season 3 (2013): The Full Bounty ===
No. overall	No. in season	Title	Directed by	Written by	Original release date
20	1	"The Bounty Begins"	Tom Stern	Story by : J. Holland Moore; Teleplay by : J. Holland Moore & Trevor Dellecave	January 8, 2013
28-year-old Chase Rogan participates against nine other people in a reality show called The Full Bounty for a chance to become a bounty hunter. However, unbeknownst to him, the entire show is an elaborate hoax and his fellow competitors are really actors. Chase meets bounty hunter and host Jake Montrose (Ralph Garman). Chase soon becomes uncomfortable with actor Lorenzo Lamas (who is playing himself), forms an alliance with Laverinus (Segun Oduolowu) and showcases his determination to win during a stun-gun competition.
21	2	"A Date With Lady Justice"	Tom Stern	Story by : J. Holland Moore; Teleplay by : J. Holland Moore & Trevor Dellecave	January 8, 2013
22	3	"Schmo in the Wild"	Tom Stern	Story by : J. Holland Moore; Teleplay by : J. Holland Moore & Trevor Dellecave	January 15, 2013
23	4	"Say Hey to Ray Ray"	Tom Stern	Story by : J. Holland Moore; Teleplay by : J. Holland Moore & Trevor Dellecave	January 22, 2013
24	5	"Bring Your Convict to Work Day"	Tom Stern	Story by : J. Holland Moore; Teleplay by : J. Holland Moore & Trevor Dellecave	January 29, 2013
25	6	"An Actor Among Us!"	Tom Stern	Story by : J. Holland Moore; Teleplay by : J. Holland Moore & Trevor Dellecave	February 5, 2013
26	7	"Is That a Gun in Your Pocket?"	Tom Stern	Story by : J. Holland Moore; Teleplay by : J. Holland Moore & Trevor Dellecave	February 12, 2013
27	8	"Fear No Evil"	Tom Stern	Story by : J. Holland Moore; Teleplay by : J. Holland Moore & Trevor Dellecave	February 19, 2013
28	9	"The Rise of the Lamas"	Tom Stern	Story by : J. Holland Moore; Teleplay by : J. Holland Moore & Trevor Dellecave	February 26, 2013
29	10	"The Reveal"	Tom Stern	Story by : J. Holland Moore; Teleplay by : J. Holland Moore & Trevor Dellecave	March 5, 2013

=== Season 4 (2025) ===
No. overall	No. in season	Title	Directed by	Written by	Original release date	U.S. viewers (millions)
30	1	"Ben from Baltimore"	Tony Croll	Chad Damiani	January 21, 2025	0.251
31	2	"The Golden Goat"	Tony Croll	Chad Damiani	January 28, 2025	0.254
32	3	"It's All a Prank on Me"	Tony Croll	Bri LeRose	February 4, 2025	0.201
33	4	"Think Inside the Box"	Tony Croll	Chad Damiani	February 11, 2025	0.215
34	5	"The Ascent of Nicodemus"	Tony Croll	Dan Swimer	February 18, 2025	0.265
35	6	"The Enigma of Testocales"	Tony Croll	Bri LeRose	February 25, 2025	0.192
36	7	"One Flew Over the Loser's Loft"	Tony Croll	Chad Damiani	March 4, 2025	0.230
37	8	"A Hairy Predicament"	Tony Croll	Dan Swimer	March 11, 2025	0.284
38	9	"The Triumvirate"	Tony Croll	Bri LeRose	March 18, 2025	0.178
39	10	"The Greatest of All Time"	Tony Croll	Dan Swimer	March 25, 2025	0.245
