= Sean Callery =

American composer (born 1961)

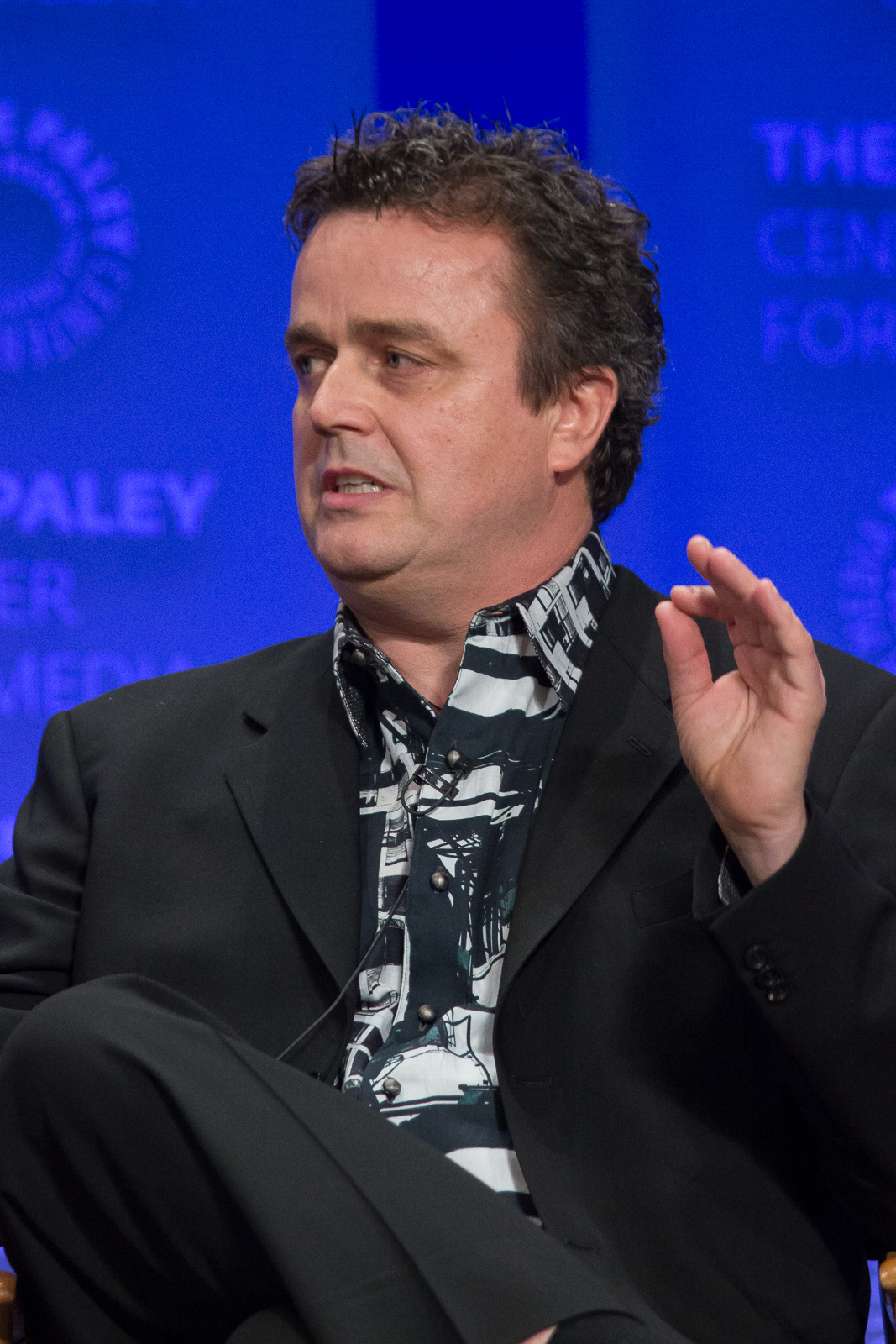
- Callery at the 2015 PaleyFest
- Born: 1964 (age 61–62); Hartford, Connecticut, U.S.
- Occupation: Composer

Sean Callery (born 1964) is an American musician and composer, best known for composing the music for the action/drama 24 and the Marvel adaptation Jessica Jones. Other projects include the 2004 video game, James Bond 007: Everything or Nothing and the television series La Femme Nikita and Homeland. Most recently he composes the music for the series Designated Survivor and Bull.

== Biography ==
Callery was born in Hartford, Connecticut and raised in Bristol, Rhode Island. He studied at the New England Conservatory of Music, earning a degree in piano performance in 1987. In 1987, Callery moved to Los Angeles to work for New England Digital, the creators of the Synclavier synthesizer.

In 1990, he and John Farrar scored the NBC television film, A Mom for Christmas. Working as a sound designer on the series Star Trek: Deep Space Nine also earned him an Emmy nomination. In 1996, Callery was hired to compose the underscore for the USA Network series, La Femme Nikita, which aired for five seasons between 1997 and 2001.

Callery next again collaborated with Surnow on the television series 24 from 2001 to 2010. For his work on that series, he received three Emmy Award for Outstanding Music Composition For a Series (Dramatic Underscore), in 2003, 2006 and 2010. He also won the 2007 Film & TV Music Awards for Best Score for a Dramatic Television Program and Best Television Theme for his work on the series. In addition to his work on 24, Callery scored the music to the television series Medium from 2005 to 2010, all the episodes of Shark, and composed the music for Bones beginning with its fourth season.

In 2011 he scored the music to the miniseries The Kennedys and Kiefer Sutherland's webseries The Confession. In December, 2011, he teamed up with executive producer Howard Gordon of 24 again, for the television series Homeland. In 2012, he composed the theme music for the CBS television show Elementary. In 2014, he scored the music to the ninth season of 24, 24: Live Another Day, a special event-series, after a four-year hiatus. In 2015, he scored the music to Marvel's Jessica Jones on Netflix, for which he won the 2016 Emmy for Outstanding Original Main Title Music, which brings his total Emmy wins up to four.

== Discography ==
=== Film ===
Year	Title	Director	Studio(s)	Notes
1995	Fun House Express	Yas Takata	IMAX	Short film
2000	Blowback	Mark L. Lester	Lionsgate Home Entertainment	
2014	Small Time	Joel Surnow	Anchor Bay Entertainment	
2021	The Marksman	Robert Lorenz	Open Road Films	

=== Television ===
==== Television films ====
Year	Title	Director	Studio(s)	Notes
1990	A Mom for Christmas	George T. Miller	Walt Disney Television	—N/a
2005	Mayday	T. J. Scott	—N/a	—N/a
2006	Not Like Everyone Else	Tom McLoughlin	—N/a	—N/a
2008	24: Redemption	Jon Cassar	20th Century Fox Television	—N/a

==== Television series ====
Year	Title	Studio(s)	Notes
1997–2001	La Femme Nikita	Warner Bros. Television	—N/a
2000	Freedom	Warner Bros. Television	Episode: "Enemy" (Season 1, Episode 4)
2000–2001	Sheena	Columbia TriStar Television	—N/a
2001–2010	24	20th Century Fox Television	One Emmy win for Outstanding Music for each season 2, 5 and 8.
2005–2011	Medium	CBS Television Studios	—N/a
2006	Treasure Hunters	Imagine Television	—N/a
2006–2008	Shark	20th Century Fox Television	—N/a
2007	The 1/2 Hour News Hour	20th Century Fox Television	—N/a
2008–2017	Bones	20th Century Fox Television	—N/a
2010	The Whole Truth	Warner Bros. Television	—N/a
2011	The Confession	Digital Broadcasting Group	—N/a
2011	The Kennedys	Shaw Media	—N/a
2011–2020	Homeland	Fox 21 Television Studios	—N/a
2012	The Finder	20th Century Fox Television	Episode: "An Orphan Walks Into a Bar" (Season 1, Episode 1); Episode: "Bullets " (Season 1, Episode 2)
2012–2019	Elementary	CBS Television Studios	—N/a
2013	24 (Indian TV series)	—N/a	—N/a
2014	24: Live Another Day	20th Century Fox Television	—N/a
2015	Backstrom	20th Century Fox Television	—N/a
2015	Minority Report	20th Century Fox Television; Paramount Television	—N/a
2015	Jessica Jones	Marvel Television; ABC Studios	One Emmy win for Outstanding Original Main Title Theme in 2016.
2016–2018	Designated Survivor	ABC Studios	—N/a
2017	24: Legacy	20th Century Fox Television	Spin-off of 24
2017	Inhumans	Marvel Television; ABC Studios	—N/a
2018–2022	Bull	CBS Television Studios	—N/a
2020	Next	20th Century Fox Television	—N/a
2022	Halo	Paramount+	—N/a
2022–2023	Walker: Independence	CBS Television Studios	—N/a
2026	R.J. Decker	20th Television	—N/a

=== Web ===
Year	Title	Studio(s)	Notes
2007	The Rookie	—N/a	—N/a

=== Video games ===
Year	Title	Studio(s)	Notes
2003	James Bond 007: Everything or Nothing	EA Redwood Shores	Composed with Jeff Tymoschuk
2006	24: The Game	SCE Cambridge Studio	—N/a
