= Living the Dream (New Zealand TV series) =

- Presented by: Mark Ferguson
- Starring: Jason Fitch; Awanui Simich-Pene; Jeremy Birchall; Stephan Hall; Kirsty Cooke; Sarah Thomson; Charlie McDermott; Victoria Blackman
- Country of origin: New Zealand

Production
- Production company: Touchdown Television

Original release
- Network: TV2
- Release: August 2004

Living the Dream was the New Zealand version of Spike TV's Joe Schmo Show, produced by Touchdown Television for TV2.

== Description ==
It was a reality TV show (actually a parody of reality game shows) that began airing in August 2004 and involves a setup that is reminiscent of the movie The Truman Show.

One man, Sam Chambers, thinks he's on a reality TV show called Living the Dream. However, all of the other members in this reality TV show, including the host, are actually actors and the entire show is an elaborate hoax centred on the main character. All of the events and games played are staged to give a particular outcome designed to elicit a response from the main character for comedic effect.

The other "contestants" are stereotypes of common reality TV show contestants. They are (real names follow character names/descriptions):

- Mick the Prick – Jason Fitch
- Rima, the Schemer – Awanui Simich-Pene
- Billy the Gay Guy – Jeremy Birchall
- Mule the Former SAS Soldier – Stephan Hall
- Betty the New Age flake – Kirsty Cooke
- Tiffany the Rich Bitch – Sarah Thomson
- Ben the Best Mate - Charlie McDermott
- Mary the Virgin – Victoria Blackman
- Mark Ferguson, the Smarmy host – Himself

At the end of the show, Chambers received the $50,000 prize for which he was "competing" as well as all the other prizes given away in the show.

Sam's colloquial exclamation "Crikey!" became the show's catchphrase.
