= Nicholas Tucci =

American actor (1981–2020)

- Born: Nicholas Whitney Tucci; April 3, 1981; Middletown, Connecticut, U.S.
- Died: March 3, 2020 (aged 38); New Haven, Connecticut, U.S.
- Education: Yale University
- Occupation: Actor

Nicholas Whitney Tucci (April 3, 1981 – March 3, 2020) was an American actor.

== Early life ==
Tucci was born in Middletown, Connecticut in 1981. He attended Middletown High School in his hometown, and earned a bachelor's degree in theatre from Yale University in 2004. Tucci was of Italian descent.

== Career ==
Tucci appeared in the films Undocumented (2010), Choose (2011), You're Next (2011), The Worst Year of My Life (2015), Most Beautiful Island (2017), The Ranger (2018), and Long Lost (2018). His television appearances included roles on Daredevil, Homeland, Pose, and Quantico. Tucci voiced characters in the video games Wolfenstein: The New Order and Wolfenstein II: The New Colossus.

== Death ==
Tucci died at the Smilow Cancer Hospital in New Haven, Connecticut, on March 3, 2020, after a private battle with cancer. He was 38.
