= Grady Cooper =

American film producer and director

- Born: Grady Cooper III; Raleigh, North Carolina, US
- Education: University of North Carolina; Broughton High School
- Occupations: Film editor, producer, director
- Years active: 1987-present
- Television: Bigger and Blacker; Survivor; The Unicorn; The Voice
- Awards: Nominated for an Emmy in 2018 and 2000

Grady Cooper III, known professionally as Grady Cooper, is an American director, producer and Emmy nominated film editor.

== Background ==
Cooper is from Raleigh, North Carolina and graduated from Broughton High School. In high school, "Grady convinced his teachers to let him make short films…instead of writing papers." He attended the University of North Carolina at Chapel Hill and graduated with a degree in English in 1987.

While in college, Cooper worked on comedy shows for UNC Student Television along with Bill Martin and Peyton Reed. He also produced a music video for the Chapel Hill band The Connells and was a production assistant for the feature film Bull Durham which was shot in Durham, North Carolina.

In the 1990s, Cooper also produced music videos for Chapel Hill bands Archers of Loaf and Squirrel Nut Zippers. After college, he took a position with West, Pausback & Vaughn as a traffic manager. However, he soon moved to Los Angeles to work in film.

== Film ==
Once in Los Angeles, Cooper worked as a post-production assistant for Andrew Solt who produced documentaries. This allowed him to learn about editing and step up to bigger projects. He edited D. L. Hughley's Going Home special in 1988, Chris Rock's HBO special Bigger and Blacker in 1999, and the television show Curb Your Enthusiasm in 2000-2001. After one season of Curb Your Enthusiasm, Cooper decided to start his own editorial company. This led to directing commercials, including one for Target.

In 2003, Cooper and improv comic Lance Krall made Party Animals, a short film which premiered at the Los Angeles International Film Festival and was an official selection in the Slamdance Film Festival in Park City, Utah. From 2004 to 2005, Cooper directed and produced the unscripted comedy sketch show, The Lance Krall Show, which aired on Spike (now Paramount) for one season. Cooper was the editor for many television shows through the 2000s and 2010s, including Awkward, Hell's Kitchen, Last Comic Standing, Lopez, The Office, Survivor, Teachers, and The Voice.

In 2019, Cooper created the CBS sitcom The Unicorn which is based on his own experiences as a widower and single parent, as well as his return to dating. The concept for the show emerged when Cooper shared his experiences with college friends Bill Martin, now a television writer known for 3rd Rock from the Sun, and Peyton Reed, now a director and producer known for Ant-Man. He asked them, "Do you think this could be a comedy?" The trio began collaborating on The Unicorn, which aired for two seasons.

== Awards ==
Cooper has received two Emmy nominations:

- Outstanding Picture Editing For A Structured Or Competition Reality Program - 2018, for his work on The Voice
- Outstanding Multi-Camera Picture Editing for a Miniseries, Movie or a Special - 2010, for his work on Bigger & Blacker

== Personal ==
Cooper lives in Studio City, Los Angeles, California. In 1995, he married Jane DeVries and the couple had two daughters—Audrey and Ellen. In 2015 when Jane was 49, she died of brain cancer.
