= Free Radio =

- Lance Krall: Star, Co-Creator, Co-Writer, Co-Editor and Executive Producer of Free Radio
- Genre: Mockumentary
- Created by: Lance Krall; Rory Rosegarten
- Written by: Lance Krall; Rory Rosegarten
- Directed by: Peter Siaggas
- Starring: Lance Krall; Anna Vocino; Brian Huskey; Sarah Baker; Gerry Bednob
- Country of origin: United States
- Original language: English
- No. of seasons: 2
- No. of episodes: 17

Production
- Executive producers: Lance Krall; Rory Rosegarten; Jim Akerman
- Producer: Matt R. Brady
- Production location: Los Angeles, California/Burbank, California
- Cinematography: Bill Burton
- Editors: Lance Krall; Tony Orcena
- Running time: 30 mins.
- Production company: MRB Productions

Original release
- Network: VH1
- Release: 2008 – 2009

Free Radio is a television show, created by Lance Krall and Rory Rosegarten. The show originated on VH1, but has also aired on Comedy Central, and Super Channel. It stars Lance Krall, prominent for his role on The Joe Schmo Show, and Anna Vocino, who also starred with Krall on The Lance Krall Show.

== Plot ==
The show focuses on a dysfunctional radio station, KBOM. Krall plays a moronic intern turned moronic DJ when KBOM's regular shock jock, Rip Rebel, defects to satellite radio. Lance eventually gets his own show entitled Moron in the Morning. Real celebrities guest star as themselves with Lance, who often either does not realize who they are or mixes them up with other celebrities on the air. Most of the dialogue is improvised.

== Characters ==
Lance Krall as Lance, a former intern at KBOM who gets a job as a radio host, after the former host, Rip Rebel (Marc Graue), leaves. He becomes inexplicably popular due to his ignorance and bold stupidity while interviewing celebrities. The station dubs Lance's show "Moron in the Morning."

Anna Vocino as Anna, Lance's co-host on "Moron in the Morning." She is often annoyed by Lance's uninformed questions to their guests and his on-air antics, but enjoys the success the show has acquired.

Brian Huskey as James Reed, the uptight manager of KBOM and boss of both Lance and Anna. James was against "Moron in the Morning" from the start, but due to its success and pressure from listeners & the owners of KBOM, he has been forced to keep the show on the air.

Sarah Baker as "Emo" Sarah, KBOM's goth/emo receptionist. She is lazy and irritated by her job and dislikes James's demands.

Gerry Bednob as Bling Bling Shelton, Lance's inept talent manager.

== Episodes ==
=== Season One ===
1. "Moron in the Morning" - Angela Kinsey, Kiefer Sutherland, Luis Guzman, and the cast of All About Walken: The Impersonators of Christopher Walken.
2. "Lance Gets a Billboard" - Jack Coleman, Sara Blakely, and Daniela Sea
3. "The New Intern" - Tony Hawk, Ashley Jensen, Carl Solomon (background actor), and Howie Mandel
4. "Lance Gets a Manager" - Emily Deschanel, Don Lafontaine, Blake Lewis, and Quinton "Rampage" Jackson
5. "Snafu!" - Tony Shalhoub, air guitarist Dan Crane, Shannon Woodward, and Perez Hilton
6. "Side Kick for a Day" - Zachary Quinto, competitive eating champion Shawn Kirby, and Kat Von D
7. "Lance Gets a Bodyguard" - Omarion, Bob Saget, Danneel Harris, and Natasha Lyonne
8. "The Temp" - Mary Lynn Rajskub, James Van Der Beek, and Jeff Corwin
9. "Lance's Birthday" - Ray Romano, Penn and Teller, and Melora Hardin

=== Season Two ===
1. "Lance's Posse" - Ed Helms, Dominic Monaghan, Neil Hamburger, and Robin Meade
2. "Celebrity" - David Cook, Ed Begley, Jr., Hank Azaria, and Emily Procter
3. "KDOG" - John Stamos, Bai Ling, Jim Parsons, and Kathy Griffin
4. "Anna's Date" - Charlie Day, Glenn Howerton & Rob McElhenney (from "It's Always Sunny in Philadelphia"), Danica McKellar, and Corey Feldman
5. "Buttons" - Tony Hawk, Dr. Lauren Frances, Bree Turner, and Nick Cassavetes
6. "Earthquake" - Taryn Manning, Akon, Henry Rollins, and Rachelle Lefevre
7. "Kia" - Sam Trammell, Odette Yustman, and Omarosa Manigault-Stallworth
8. "Boxing For Boners"- Zachary Levi, Sugar Ray Leonard, and Cheech & Chong (Cheech Marin and Tommy Chong).
