= The Downer Channel =

American sketch comedy television series

- Genre: Sketch comedy
- Created by: Joan Stein; Robert Morton
- Starring: Jeff B. Davis; Wanda Sykes; Mary Lynn Rajskub; Lance Krall
- Country of origin: United States
- Original language: English
- No. of seasons: 1
- No. of episodes: 6 (2 unaired)

Production
- Camera setup: Single-camera
- Running time: 30 mins.
- Production companies: Carsey-Werner Productions; NBC Productions

Original release
- Network: NBC
- Release: July 24 – August 14, 2001

The Downer Channel is an American sketch comedy television series that aired from July 24 until August 14, 2001.

== Premise ==
Four comedians appear in a combination of sketches and reality-based segments.

== Cast ==
- Jeff B. Davis as various characters
- Wanda Sykes as various characters
- Mary Lynn Rajskub as various characters
- Lance Krall as various characters

== Episodes ==
No.	Title	Original release date
1	"Pilot"	July 24, 2001
2	"Episode #102"	July 31, 2001
3	"Episode #103"	August 7, 2001
4	"Episode #104"	August 14, 2001
5	"Episode #105"	Unaired
6	"Episode #106"	Unaired
