= Made-Up =

- Directed by: Tony Shalhoub
- Written by: Lynne Adams
- Produced by: Brooke Adams; Lynne Adams; Mark Donaldo
- Starring: Brooke Adams; Tony Shalhoub
- Cinematography: Gary Henoch
- Edited by: Michael Matzdorff
- Music by: Michael Wolff
- Production company: Vanity Films
- Distributed by: Sister Films
- Release date: March 2, 2002 (Santa Barbara)
- Running time: 96 minutes
- Country: United States
- Language: English

Made-Up is a 2002 American comedy drama film directed by Tony Shalhoub and starring Brooke Adams and Shalhoub.

== Cast ==
- Brooke Adams as Elizabeth James Tivey
- Lynne Adams as Kate James
- Eva Amurri as Sara Tivey
- Kalen Conover as Chris
- Light Eternity as Molly Avrums
- Jim Issa as Eli
- Lance Krall as Simon
- Tony Shalhoub as Max Hires
- Gary Sinise as Duncan Tivey

== Production ==
The film was shot in Lynne Adams' home in Boston.

== Release ==
The film premiered at the Santa Barbara International Film Festival on March 2, 2002. Then it was released in New York City on January 24, 2004 and had a limited release in Los Angeles on February 13, 2004.

== Reception ==
The film has a 39% rating on Rotten Tomatoes based on 31 reviews.

Wesley Morris of The Boston Globe gave the film a negative review and wrote, "It wants, as Kate says about her documentary, to be a 'seminal work on beauty and aging.' But it wears like a gauzy romantic comedy."

Kevin Thomas of the Los Angeles Times gave the film a positive review, calling it "a comedy with lots going on and with considerable depth and complexity."
