= Deep (2017 film) =

- Spanish theatrical release poster
- Directed by: Julio Soto Gurpide
- Screenplay by: Julio Soto Gurpide; Jose Tatay; Salva Rubio
- Story by: Julio Soto Gurpide; Jose Tatay
- Produced by: Adriana Malfatti Chen; Karl Richards; Julio Soto Gurpide; Adrian Politowski
- Starring: Justin Felbinger; Stephen Hughes; Lindsey Alena; Elisabeth Gray; Anna Vocino; Dwight Schultz
- Edited by: Julio Soto Gurpide
- Music by: Fernando Velázquez
- Production companies: The Thinklab; Umedia; Grid Animation; Silver Reel; The Kraken Films
- Distributed by: Tripictures (Spain); Kinepolis Film Distribution (Belgium); Lionsgate; Grindstone Entertainment Group (United States)
- Release dates: May 19, 2017 (Vietnam); August 24, 2017 (China); August 25, 2017 (United States); November 3, 2017 (Spain); February 7, 2018 (Belgium)
- Running time: 93 minutes
- Countries: Spain; Belgium; Switzerland; United States; China; United Kingdom
- Language: English
- Budget: € 6,000,000
- Box office: $10.9 million

Deep is a 2017 English-language animated science fiction musical adventure comedy film directed by Julio Soto Gurpide with a screenplay by Soto Gurpide, Jose Tatay, Salva Rubio from a story by Soto Gurpide and Tatay. Inspiration for the film came from Julio's deep sea diving experiences.

== Plot ==
In a post-apocalyptic future the planet was subjected to an ecological catastrophe, and as a result the Earth was flooded. At the same time, sea inhabitants also suffered a catastrophe. The Colossal squid Kraken managed to save several inhabitants and formed a safe place to live with them, which is a colony located in the deep sea of the Atlantic Ocean.

Kraken's grandson, Deep, considers life to be boring, but shows an interest in objects made by humans. He also involves his friends: anglerfish Evo and shrimp Alice. Soon one of Deep's "pranks" accidentally endangers the inhabitants of his home and encloses them by stones. Deep learns from Kraken that only the white whale Nathan can help them, and tells his grandson the necessary landmarks to identify where Nathan can be found. Deep, Evo and Alice set out to find Nathan.

After passing several landmarks, the friends get to the Titanic, where they find the vampire squid Norma. She makes them listen to her musical performance, and tells them that in order to find Nathan, they need to get to Broadway. The heroes leave the ship with difficulty, since Norma would not let them go.

Along the way, Deep is attacked by the Moray eel Maura, but immediately after hearing from him that he has friends, she admits that she is lonely. Deep adds Maura to the team, despite the fact that Alice and Evo are against taking a predator that accidentally ate them on the first night.

Having reached the Brooklyn Bridge, the friends find themselves surrounded by crabs, where their leader, the yeti crab Rico, challenges them to a dance battle. Alice's performance strikes Rico, and he falls in love with her. After that, the heroes pass the Brooklyn Bridge onto the streets of flooded New York City. They enter the radiation zone and overcome a number of zombie piranhas.

The characters have a disagreement when it becomes apparent they are lost, and everyone accuses Deep of taking them on a dangerous journey. They meet the penguin Darcy and his assistants: the walrus Luigi and the dolphin Ralph. While Darcy and Luigi distract the main characters by watching the film about the project "Ark-1" and "Ark-2" (which are spacecraft that saved humans and ground animals respectively, by leaving the Earth and settling another planet), they discuss the plan to freeze them and leave the Earth on the "Ark-3" (which is for aquatic animals).

When the heroes are placed in a trap, they finally met Nathan, who is chained, and immediately learn of Darcy's plan to freeze everyone, including Maura, who had not fallen into the trap. Deep, Alice and Evo manage to disable the cell without letting it freeze, and then get out of the locked cell and join Maura in battle against Darcy, Luigi and Ralph. As a result, they triumph over the trio and are ejected from the in-motion "Ark-3" along with Nathan and the other sea creatures.

Returning home, the group, along with Nathan, begin to free Kraken and the others, and Deep nearly sacrifices himself to save the others and frees himself from the debris. After liberation, Maura offers an idea where it will be possible to start fertilizing and increase the population, while Deep finds love. Darcy, Ralph and Luigi are stranded on a floating ice floe in the Arctic Ocean near Greenland crying out for help.

== Cast ==
- Justin Felbinger as Deep, a yellow grimpoteuthis, Kraken's grandson, main protagonist
- Stephen Hughes as Evo, a clumsy anglerfish
- Lindsey Alena as Alice, a neurotic shrimp
- Elisabeth Gray as Maura, a vegetarian moray eel
- Dwight Schultz as Kraken, an elderly colossal squid, Deep's grandpa
- William Salyers as Darcy, an emperor penguin that is the commander of the Ark-3, main antagonist
- Bob Bergen as Ralph, a bottlenose dolphin with low intelligence, one of Darcy's minions
- Jess Harnell as Luigi, an Italian-accented walrus, one of Darcy's minions
- Phil LaMarr as Artie a crayfish who serves as an advisor for Kraken
- Lewis MacLeod as Nathan, a Scottish-accented sperm whale with red eyes
- Joe Hernandez as Rico, a Brooklyn-accented yeti crab
- Anna Vocino as Norma, a purple vampire squid named after Norma Desmond from Sunset Boulevard

== Release ==
Deep was first released in Hungary on May 11, 2017. It was then released in China on August 24, and in the United States the following day. The film was released in Belgium on February 7, 2018.

== Reception ==
On Rotten Tomatoes the film has an approval rating of 33% based on reviews from six critics.

== See also ==
- List of underwater science fiction works
