= The Worst Year of My Life =

- Directed by: Jonathan Smith
- Written by: Jonathan Smith
- Produced by: Nicole Day; Bernie Stern; Amy Vorpahl
- Starring: Trevor St. John David; Amy Vorpahl; Nicholas Tucci; Cate Beehan
- Cinematography: Matt Gulley
- Edited by: Jonathan Smith
- Music by: Julia Meinwald
- Production company: Vile Henchmen Productions
- Release date: February 13, 2015
- Running time: 81 minutes
- Country: United States
- Language: English

The Worst Year of My Life is a 2015 American comedy-drama film directed by Jonathan Smith, starring Trevor St. John David, Amy Vorpahl, Nicholas Tucci and Cate Beehan.

== Cast ==
- Trevor St. John David as Kyle
- Amy Vorpahl as Amber
- Nicholas Tucci as Todd
- Cate Beehan as Jennifer
- Nicole Day as Laura
- Brandie Posey as Rona
- Deidre Scott as Lacey
- Rachel Kerbs as Zoe
- Anna Vocino as Kyle's Mother

== Reception ==
Frank Lovece of Film Journal International wrote that "With brisk, clear storytelling that moves quickly without seeming rushed, and with adroit, imaginative cuts many young filmmakers don't think to try, writer-director-editor Smith impresses with both his technical skill and with his achingly real depiction of a doomed relationship, giving us a story that's familiar yet fresh, and perhaps the most honest and naturalistic romantic film since who-knows-when."

The Hollywood Reporter wrote that while it "would have been easier to accept Kyle as a more reliable narrator—and the story is told entirely from his point of view—if the scales had been a little more balanced", it "provides a refreshing alternative that deals in realistic fashion with the sort of relationship we all find ourselves in at one time or another."

Gary Goldstein of the Los Angeles Times wrote that "Amber so often comes off as such a dreadful mate that frankly, the less of her, the better."
