= Jillian Wheeler =

American singer-songwriter

Jillian Wheeler (Je Wheeler)
- Also known as: Je Wheeler, J Wheeler, Jillian Lee Wheeler
- Born: Jillian Lee Wheeler; May 25, 1991 (age 34)
- Origin: New Hampshire, U.S.
- Genres: Indie rock, pop, electronic
- Occupations: Singer-songwriter, actress
- Years active: 1997–present
- Website: jillianwheeler.com

Jillian (Je) Wheeler (born May 25, 1991, in New Hampshire), also known as "Je Wheeler", is an American singer-songwriter and former actress. She also works as a freelance international photographer, videographer, and travel writer.

As an actress, Wheeler played Sara Markum in the 2003 film Mystic River.

== Music career ==
Wheeler has released several recordings. In 2003, she released an EP titled Test of Time at the age of twelve. A year later she released "Attention". After being signed under Whiz Kidz Records in 2005, Wheeler spent several months in Los Angeles, California, recording a full-length album entitled Beautiful Things. She spent the following summer slated in on the 2005 Camplified tour, and went on to participate in several Radio Disney Tours. She took a hiatus from her solo career when Whiz Kidz Records dissolved in 2006 and focused on learning instruments and writing, and was active in several musical projects. During her time at Northeastern University in Boston, Massachusetts, she released two digital albums – "Bus Rides Home" in 2009 and "Lion" in 2011. She released a new Electro/Pop album recorded in Berlin called "On the Rocks" in the summer of 2016.

Early on, Jillian participated on a Radio Disney tour and in many Radio Disney events in the Northeast. She has opened for artists such as Hilary Duff, JoJo, Aaron Carter, Skye Sweetnam, Bowling for Soup, Jordan Knight and many others. Most recently, she played small venues in Europe and Asia. She has performed at many music festivals, in clubs, theaters and arenas such as the Boston Garden, Wells Fargo Center in Philadelphia, Whittemore Center at the University of New Hampshire and the Mohegan Sun Arena.

== Acting career ==
Wheeler began acting at the age of six in commercials and theater productions. Her first role was a local theater production of Annie, followed by regional and equity productions, including Into The Woods, A Midsummer Night's Dream, Annie Warbucks, The Music Man, The Sound of Music and School House Rock. Wheeler made her debut at the San Jose Repertory Theater in the play By The Bog of Cats starring alongside Holly Hunter, for which she was awarded a Dean Goodman Choice Award for Supporting Actress. She was then cast in the world premier of The Mandrake Root alongside Lynne Redgrave.

Wheeler played one of Sean Penn and Laura Linney's daughters in Mystic River. She also had roles in Osmosis Jones, The Legend of Lucy Keyes, and Little Erin Merryweather. She was an active cast member on World Family's Zippy and Me and Disney's World of English from 1999 to 2004.

== Personal life ==
Je Wheeler grew up in Windham, New Hampshire, but spent much of her youth in Boston, Massachusetts, New York City, San Jose, California, and Los Angeles, California while pursuing her career in music and acting. She became interested in video production at a young age, and focused on video production and communications while attending Salem High School and Northeastern University.
