= The Layover (film) =

2017 film by William H. Macy

- Release poster
- Directed by: William H. Macy
- Written by: David Hornsby; Lance Krall
- Produced by: Keith Kjarval; Aaron L. Gilbert
- Starring: Alexandra Daddario; Kate Upton
- Cinematography: Mark Irwin
- Edited by: Wendy Greene Bricmont
- Music by: Daniel James; Leah Haywood; Rob Ellmore
- Production companies: Unified Pictures; Bron Studios; Creative Wealth Media
- Distributed by: Vertical Entertainment
- Release dates: August 3, 2017 (DirecTV Cinema); September 1, 2017 (United States)
- Running time: 88 minutes
- Country: United States
- Language: English

The Layover is a 2017 American sex comedy film directed by William H. Macy and written by David Hornsby and Lance Krall, starring Alexandra Daddario, Kate Upton, Matt Barr, Matt L. Jones, Rob Corddry, Kal Penn, and Molly Shannon. Filming began in May 2015 in Vancouver, St. Louis, and parts of Florida, and was completed in June 2015.

The film was released on DirecTV Cinema on August 3, 2017, followed by a limited theatrical release in the United States on September 1, 2017, by Vertical Entertainment.

== Plot ==
Kate and Meg are lifelong friends and roommates in Seattle who are going through stressful times. Kate is a high school English teacher being pressured by Principal Moss to resign, while Meg is a struggling cosmetics saleswoman. After a night of drinking, Meg suggests they go on vacation together to escape their stressful lives. Kate is reluctant but ultimately acquiesces, as Meg has already booked non-refundable tickets to Fort Lauderdale using Kate's frequent flyer miles.

On the plane, Kate and Meg are seated next to Ryan, a handsome firefighter on his way to a wedding. Both women are immediately attracted to him and begin to shamelessly flirt. A few hours into the flight, the plane is diverted to St. Louis due to a hurricane warning. The women are taken to the local Sheraton and run into Ryan, who invites them to drinks at the hotel club. Before going to bed, Kate tells Meg that she will fight her for Ryan's affections.

When it is learned the hurricane will move away from Florida, Ryan manages to get a ride from Craig, a jewelry salesman who had taken a liking to Meg but had been continually rebuffed by her, and the women ask to tag along. Kate shows embarrassing childhood photos of Meg to the men for their amusement, so Meg retaliates by locking Kate in a gas station bathroom, forcing her to escape through a high window, getting covered in feces.

Back in the car, Kate fakes an injury to get a massage from Ryan, prompting Meg to place sleeping pills into a bottle of wine to give to her. When she declines to drink, Craig, who is driving, takes it instead, to Meg's horror. After a few hours, Craig passes out and crashes the car, forcing the four to spend the night at a motel.

When Kate sees the pills in the bottle, she asks for a hotel room for herself. Meg says she can have Ryan, but Kate says she never wanted him and just did not want Meg to have him. Meg decides to go to a local bar where Craig joins her. When he fails to impress her, he suggests she be open to the qualities of other men.

Back at the hotel, Ryan makes a pass at Kate, who gives in and has vigorous sex with him. In the morning at breakfast, Meg tells Kate they should not jeopardize their friendship over a man, but when Meg lets slip that Ryan has a misshapen penis, she realizes Meg had sex with Ryan as well, and they get into a physical fight, making a mess of the motel lobby in the process. Their fight ends when the motel manager calls the police.

Craig tells the police that Ryan took his car to make it to the wedding on time. When he looks up Ryan's Google Plus profile, he sees that Ryan is the one getting married, and tells the women. Appalled, they beg to be released so they can stop the wedding, and are let go after paying for the damage to the lobby.

The two women arrive at the hotel in Fort Lauderdale where the wedding is taking place, but it is too late to stop it. They confront Ryan, who calls them out for throwing themselves at him. The women still insist it was wrong for him to sleep with both of them the night before his wedding and not tell them he was the one being married. Ryan admits he has been with his now-wife, Genevieve, since freshman year of college and has not been able to get with anyone else.

When the women meet Genevieve, they see she is possessive and choose not to tell her about his infidelity, seeing that Ryan will suffer from his miserable marriage. With a few hours before their flight back to Seattle, Meg tracks down Craig at his jewelry shop to apologize for brushing him off, kissing him before she leaves. At the airport, Meg tells Kate they should no longer live together. Kate tearfully agrees, as they have been too dependent on each other.

Kate returns to her job with renewed vigor and asks Principal Moss to let her students indulge their creativity more instead of just following the standard curriculum. Moss tells Kate he had no intention of firing her; he actually wants to offer her the assistant volleyball coach position. Meg starts taking classes and is in a long-distance relationship with Craig. Meanwhile, she has moved into an apartment only a few doors down from Kate so they can still be close.

== Cast ==
- Alexandra Daddario as Kate Jeffries, a high school teacher and Meg's best friend
- Kate Upton as Meg, a businesswoman and Kate's best friend
- Matt Barr as Ryan, the object of Kate and Meg's affection
- Matt L. Jones as Craig
- Rob Corddry as Principal Stan Moss, Kate's boss and apparent nemesis
- Kal Penn as Anuj, a hotel manager
- Molly Shannon as Nancy
- Jennifer Cheon as Genevieve
- Eric Gibson as Demarius
- Carrie Genzel as buyer

== Production ==
On March 25, 2015, it was announced that William H. Macy would direct and star in a road-trip sex comedy film titled The Layover, scripted by David Hornsby and Lance Krall. Keith Kjarval would produce through Unified Pictures, along with Aaron L. Gilbert through Bron Studios. Lea Michele and Kate Upton were cast as best friends who take a vacation to avoid their problems. On April 24, TheWrap revealed that Alexandra Daddario joined the film; she replaced Michele after she left the project. Rob Corddry, Kal Penn, and Matt Barr were confirmed for the cast on May 7, and Matt L. Jones was also added. Macy does not appear in the film.

Filming began in the first week of May 2015 in Vancouver, St. Louis, and parts of Florida, and wrapped in the second week of June.

== Release ==
The film was released on DirecTV Cinema on August 3, 2017, followed by a limited theatrical release in the United States on September 1, 2017, by Vertical Entertainment.

== Reception ==
On the review aggregator website Rotten Tomatoes, the film holds an approval rating of 0% based on 18 reviews, with an average rating of 2.1/10. Metacritic, which uses a weighted average, assigned the film a score of 15 out of 100, based on 7 critics, indicating "overwhelming dislike".

Ben Kenigsberg wrote for The New York Times that the film is just about fighting over a man. Richard Roeper, writing for the Chicago Sun-Times, compared the film to the unpleasantness of enduring a layover at O'Hare International Airport, decried Upton's performance, and expressed surprise that Macy could have directed such "an unholy mess".
