= The Truth About Emanuel =

- Theatrical release poster
- Directed by: Francesca Gregorini
- Written by: Francesca Gregorini
- Produced by: Matt R. Brady; Francesca Gregorini
- Starring: Jessica Biel; Kaya Scodelario; Alfred Molina; Frances O'Connor
- Cinematography: Polly Morgan
- Edited by: Antony Langdon
- Music by: Nathan Larson
- Production companies: MRB Productions; Pisces Rising Productions; Rooks Nest Entertainment
- Release dates: January 18, 2013 (Sundance Film Festival); January 10, 2014 (United States)
- Running time: 96 minutes
- Country: United States
- Language: English

The Truth About Emanuel is a 2013 American thriller drama film written, directed, and produced by Francesca Gregorini. The film stars Jessica Biel, Kaya Scodelario, Alfred Molina, Jimmi Simpson, Aneurin Barnard and Frances O'Connor. It premiered at the Sundance Film Festival on January 18, 2013.

== Plot ==
Emanuel is a 17-year-old girl still wracked with guilt that her mother died giving birth to her. She meets Claude, whom she becomes romantically involved with. Emanuel lives at her home in Los Angeles with her father and her stepmother, with whom she has issues.

A woman named Linda moves next door; she looks just like Emanuel's mother. Emanuel discovers that Linda needs a babysitter, and she takes the job so she can get to know more about Linda. Emanuel discovers that "baby Chloe" is actually a doll. As Linda and Emanuel develop a friendship, Emanuel tries to hide from others the fact that Linda's "child" is really a doll. This becomes harder when her friend from work Arthur agrees to babysit so Linda can attend Emanuel's birthday dinner.

At dinner, while in the kitchen Emanuel's stepmother, Janice, tells Linda that Emanuel is troubled and might be misinterpreting Linda's fondness for her. When Claude agrees to landscape for Linda, Emanuel becomes angry at his sudden presence in several areas of her life. Claude tells Emanuel that she won't have to see him anymore and leaves.

Emanuel babysits when Linda goes out with Arthur. When they return home, Linda suggests Arthur go upstairs with her to see the baby, who Emanuel says is sleeping. Emanuel begs Arthur not to go upstairs but after Linda calls him up again he heads upstairs and realizes the baby is not real. Linda realizes that Chloe is a doll and panics about where her baby is, thinking that Emanuel replaced Linda's baby with a doll. They call Emanuel and ask her where Chloe is. She tells them Chloe is in her crib, and Arthur shows her that it is a doll, demanding to know where Linda's baby is. Emanuel has a meltdown, takes the doll, and faints. She has a vision in which she holds onto Chloe while water floods the room.

Emanuel swims out of a window into a body of water, holding the doll and sees her dead mother swimming. The doll springs to life and swims to Emanuel's mother, who embraces the baby and swims away. Emanuel hears her name being called and swims away until she awakens on a gurney with her father and a police officer present. She is taken to the hospital. When asked about the baby's disappearance, she claims that the baby got away in the water and went to Emanuel's mom and they both swam away. Once out of the hospital, Emanuel visits Claude at his job and makes up with him.

Linda's husband is found, and he explains to Emanuel and her parents that after much difficulty, they finally had a baby, but it died; autopsy results were inconclusive and Linda blamed herself and began to use a doll as a replacement. When her husband tried to have her institutionalized, she disappeared. Linda is currently being held in a psychiatric hospital. Emanuel later asks her father for permission to go see Linda but he refuses.

Emanuel breaks into Linda's house and steals the doll. With Claude's help, she sneaks into the psychiatric hospital and goes to Linda's room, telling her that her baby drowned. Emanuel describes her vision, omitting the part about her mom. Emanuel sneaks Linda out of the hospital and takes her to the cemetery where Emanuel's mother is buried. Emanuel digs a grave over her mother's tomb and buries Chloe in it. The movie ends with the two women lying in the dirt, watching the stars in the night sky.

== Cast ==
- Kaya Scodelario as Emanuel
- Jessica Biel as Linda
- Alfred Molina as Dennis
- Frances O'Connor as Janice
- Jimmi Simpson as Arthur
- Aneurin Barnard as Claude
- Sam Jaeger as Thomas
- Spencer Garrett as Officer Ted

== Production ==
=== Development ===
Rooney Mara was set to play the title character, Emanuel, before Kaya Scodelario replaced her as the lead.

=== Filming ===
Filming took place in Los Angeles, California, between 23 January 2012 and 26 February 2012.

== Release ==
The Truth About Emanuel premiered at the 2013 Sundance Film Festival on January 18, 2013. The film was also shown at the Ashland Independent Film Festival in April 2013, in November at the Denver Film Festival, and in several other film festivals in US, UK and Brazil. The film was released in US theaters on January 10, 2014, and was made available on Blu-ray and DVD on March 25, 2014.

=== Reception ===
The Truth About Emanuel received mostly negative reviews. The review aggregator website Rotten Tomatoes reports that 37% of critics gave the film a positive review, based on 30 reviews.

Jeannette Catsoulis of The New York Times wrote that the film "uses overwrought scenes of magical realism to couch psychosis as poetry and masochism as growing pains. Dependent on the cliché of women operating solely on instinct and without regard for logic (or, apparently, gainful employment), the film never finds its dramatic footing. Nor, sadly, its common sense."

Christy Lemire of RogerEbert.com rated the film 1.5 stars out of 4. She praised Kaya Scodelario's presence, but criticized the overall tone of the film. "The elaborate tap dance of protection and distraction plays like farce when it should be gripping and tense, and it's unintentionally amusing when it should be creepy or sad."

== Awards ==
Writer, director and producer Francesca Gregorini earned a nomination at the Sundance Film Festival for 2013 Grand Jury Prize – Dramatic.

Francesca Gregorini also earned the Best Feature Director prize at the 2013 L.A. Femme Film Festival.

The film earned awards at the 2013 Ashland Independent Film Festival and 2013 Brooklyn Film Festival.

== Lawsuit ==
In January 2020, writer/director Francesca Gregorini filed a copyright infringement and injunction-seeking lawsuit against Apple TV+ and the creators and producers of Servant, a psychological horror series that debuted on the new streaming network in November 2019. She alleged that Servant "is a brazen copy" of The Truth About Emanuel and accused them of sexism. Servant's creator Tony Basgallop and co-producer M. Night Shyamalan responded that neither had seen her film and that any similarity was a coincidence.

On May 28, 2020, a federal judge threw out the copyright lawsuit against M. Night Shyamalan and Apple, ruling that the TV show is not similar enough to the film to merit a lawsuit.

On July 21, 2020, the court ordered Francesca Gregorini to pay the defendants' attorneys' fees of $162,467.30. The court emphasized the objective unreasonableness of her claims and derided her list of "scattered similarities" to twist two highly dissimilar works into similarity.

The case was revived in 2022 by the Ninth Circuit Court of appeals. It concluded in January 2025 with Shyamalan and the other defendants being cleared by a jury.
