= Brooke Adams (actress) =

American actress (born 1949)

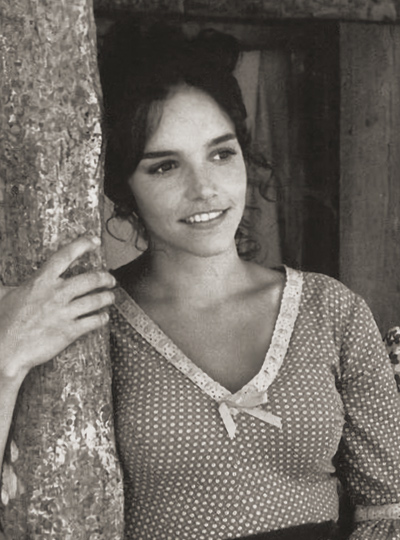
- Brooke Adams from a publicity photo for The Daughters of Joshua Cabe Return, 1975
- Born: February 8, 1949 (age 77); New York City, U.S.
- Occupation: Actress
- Years active: 1963–present
- Spouse: Tony Shalhoub (m. 1992)
- Children: 2
- Relatives: Lynne Adams (sister)

Brooke Adams (born February 8, 1949) is an American actress, best known for her film roles in Days of Heaven (1978), Invasion of the Body Snatchers (1978) and The Dead Zone (1983).

== Early life ==
Adams was born on February 8, 1949, in New York City, to Rosalind (née Gould), an actress, and Robert K. Adams, who was a producer, actor, and former vice president of CBS, as well as an unverified descendant of presidents John Adams and John Quincy Adams. Her sister is actress Lynne Adams. She attended the High School of Performing Arts and the School of American Ballet, and in her youth took dance classes at her aunt's studio in Montague, Michigan.

== Career ==
After playing roles in television and low-budget films such as Shock Waves, Adams appeared in Car Wash (1976), Days of Heaven (1978) and the remake of Invasion of the Body Snatchers (1978), for which she was nominated for the Saturn Award for Best Actress. She has also starred in the films Cuba (1979), The Dead Zone (1983), Key Exchange (1985) and Gas Food Lodging (1992), the latter earning her a nomination for the Independent Spirit Award for Best Supporting Female. In 1990, she was an actress in the play The Heidi Chronicles.

In 2002, she appeared in the romantic comedy Made-Up, which was written by her sister Lynne Adams and directed by her husband Tony Shalhoub. In 2005 Adams appeared in the films At Last and The Legend of Lucy Keyes. The same year, she starred on Broadway in The Cherry Orchard. She guest-starred in Monk, the series starring her husband, appearing in five different episodes, playing four different roles, and appearing once more in its TV movie Mr. Monk's Last Case: A Monk Movie. She also guest starred with him in an episode of Wings several years before. In 2010, she returned to Broadway in Lend Me a Tenor. In 2015, she starred in web series with her sister named "All Downhill From Here". In recent years, Adams has been performing on the stage, such as in the play "Madwomen of the West" from 2023-2024. 2025, she had a role in the off-Broadway play, "Pen Pals".

== Personal life ==
Adams has been married to actor Tony Shalhoub since 1992. They have two daughters, both of whom were adopted. They live in Hancock Park, Los Angeles and own a property on Martha's Vineyard.

== Filmography ==
=== Film ===
Year	Title	Role	Notes
1971	Murders in the Rue Morgue	Nurse (uncredited)	
1974	The Great Gatsby	Party Guest (uncredited)	
1974	The Lords of Flatbush	(uncredited)	
1976	Car Wash	Terry	Scenes deleted
1977	Shock Waves	Rose	
1978	Days of Heaven	Abby	
1978	Invasion of the Body Snatchers	Elizabeth Driscoll	Nominated—Saturn Award for Best Actress
1978	The First Great Train Robbery	(uncredited)	
1979	A Man, a Woman and a Bank	Stacey Bishop	
1979	Cuba	Alexandra Lopez de Pulido	
1980	Tell Me a Riddle	Jeannie	
1983	Utilities	Marion Edwards	
1983	The Dead Zone	Sarah Bracknell	
1984	Vengeance Is Mine	Jo	Alternate title: Haunted
1984	Terror in the Aisles	Elizabeth Driscoll	Archive footage
1985	Almost You	Erica Boyer	
1985	The Stuff	Special Guest Star In Stuff Commercial	
1985	Key Exchange	Lisa	
1987	Man on Fire	Jane Balletto	
1991	The Unborn	Virginia Marshall	Nominated—Fangoria Chainsaw Award for Best Actress
1992	Gas Food Lodging	Nora Evans	Nominated—Independent Spirit Award for Best Supporting Female
1995	The Baby-Sitters Club	Elizabeth Thomas Brewer	
2002	Made-Up	Elizabeth James Tivey	Also producer
2003	Party Animals	Celeb Mother	Short film
2004	At Last	Carol Singleton	
2006	The Legend of Lucy Keyes	Samantha Porter	
2008	The Accidental Husband	Carolyn	
2009	Gary's Walk	Marcia	
2017	Breakable You	Ruth Frank	
2018	Snapshots	Patty	Nominated—Nice International Film Festival Award for Best Supporting Actress
2019	Hamlet 360: Thy Father's Spirit	Gertrude	Video

=== Television ===
Year	Title	Role	Notes
1963	East Side/West Side	Marky Morgan	Episode: "My Child on Monday Morning"
1965	O.K. Crackerby!	Cynthia Crackerby	14 episodes
1974	F. Scott Fitzgerald and 'The Last of the Belles'	Kitty Preston	TV movie
1975	Who Is the Black Dahlia?	Diane Fowler	TV movie
1975	Song of the Succubus	Olive Deems / Gloria Chambers	TV movie
1975	Black Bart	Jennifer	TV short
1975	Murder on Flight 502	Vera Franklin	TV movie
1976	Police Woman	Angela	Episode: "Angela"
1976	James Dean	Beverly	TV movie
1976	The Bob Newhart Show	Mitzi Margolis	Episode: "The Boy Next Door"
1976	Kojak	Julie Winston	Episode: "Dead Again"
1977	Family	Lizzie	Episode: "Acts of Love: Part 1"; Episode: "Acts of Love: Part 2"
1977	Nero Wolfe	Sarah Dacos	TV movie broadcast 1979
1978	Family	Lizzie	Episode: "Echoes of Love"
1983	Great Performances	Julia Newell	Episode: "The Innocents Abroad"
1984	Lace	Jennifer "Pagan" Trelawney	TV movie
1984	Special People	Diane Dupuy	TV movie
1984	American Playhouse	Jo	Episode: "Haunted"
1985	Lace II	Pagan Tralone	TV miniseries
1986	American Playhouse	Julia Newell	Episode: "The Innocents Abroad"
1987	Paul Reiser Out on a Whim		TV movie
1987	The Lion of Africa	Grace Danet	TV movie
1988	Moonlighting	Terri Knowles	3 episodes
1989	Bridesmaids	Patricia	TV movie
1991	Sometimes They Come Back	Sally Norman	TV movie
1991	Thirtysomething	Bree Ann Pratt	Episode: "Melissa in Wonderland"
1993	The Last Hit	Anna	TV movie
1994	Picture Windows	Angie Varnas	Episode: "Song of Songs"
1994	Probable Cause	Gary's Ex-Partner	TV movie
1994	Touched by an Angel	Susana	Episode: "An Unexpected Snow"
1995	Frasier	Marilyn (voice)	Episode: "Kisses Sweeter Than Wine"
1996	Wings	Mary	Episode: "All About Christmas Eve"
1997	Gun	Joyce	Episode: "Father John"
2002	Monk	Leigh Harrison	Episode: "Mr. Monk and the Airplane"
2005	Monk	Mrs. Abigail Carlyle	Episode: "Mr. Monk and the Kid"
2007	Monk	Sheriff Margie Butterfield	Episode: "Mr. Monk Visits a Farm"
2008	Monk	Leigh Harrison	Episode: "Mr. Monk's 100th Case"
2008	Law & Order: Special Victims Unit	Margo	Episode: "PTSD"
2009	Monk	Edith Capriani	Episode: "Mr. Monk and the Badge"
2012	Hemingway & Gellhorn	Madrid Woman	TV movie
2016	BrainDead	Senator Diane Vaynerchuk	Recurring role, 5 episodes
2023	Mr. Monk's Last Case: A Monk Movie	Beth	TV movie

=== Stage ===
Year	Title	Role	Notes
1979	Wives	Kate	The Eugene O'Neill Theater Center
1980	Split	Carol	Second Stage Theater, Off-Broadway
1982	Key Exchange	Lisa	Orpheum Theatre, Off-Broadway
1984	Linda Her / The Fairy Garden	Carol	Second Stage Theater, Off-Broadway
1989	The Heidi Chronicles	Heidi Holland (Replacement)	Plymouth Theatre, Broadway
1997	The Old Neighborhood	Jolly	American Repertory Theater
2005	The Cherry Orchard	Lyubov Andreyevna Ranevskaya	Atlantic Theater Company, Off-Broadway
2010	Lend Me a Tenor	Julia	Music Box Theatre, Broadway
2013	The Last Will	Anne Shakespeare	The Modern Theatre at Suffolk University
2015	Happy Days	Winnie	Flea Theater, Off-Broadway
2023	Madwomen of the West	Jules	Actors Temple Theatre, Off-broadway
