= All I Wish =

- Theatrical release poster
- Directed by: Susan Walter
- Screenplay by: Susan Walter
- Produced by: Matthew R. Brady; Eric Brenner; Rob Carliner; Gary Preisler; Sharon Stone
- Starring: Sharon Stone; Tony Goldwyn; Famke Janssen; Ellen Burstyn
- Cinematography: Pedro Gómez Millán
- Edited by: Robert Brakey
- Production companies: Regdalin Production Company; ETA Films; MRB Productions
- Distributed by: CineTel Films; Paladin; Universal Pictures
- Release date: May 3, 2017
- Running time: 94 minutes
- Country: United States
- Language: English
- Box office: $197,734

All I Wish (also titled A Little Something for Your Birthday) is a 2017 American romantic comedy film written and directed by Susan Walter in her directorial debut, and starring Sharon Stone (who also serves as a producer), Tony Goldwyn, Famke Janssen, and Ellen Burstyn.

== Premise ==
Senna Berges, a clothing designer, is desperate to find her soulmate. Despite the constant attempts to pursue her passion for fashion design, Senna follows a path of irresponsible behavior, changing jobs and having occasional relationships with younger men. Everything seems to be out of control for Senna until her 46th birthday party where she meets Adam.

== Cast ==
- Sharon Stone as Senna Berges, Celia's daughter
- Tony Goldwyn as Adam
- Ellen Burstyn as Celia Berges, Senna's mother
- Famke Janssen as Vanessa
- Liza Lapira as Darla
- Erica Ash as Nikki
- Caitlin FitzGerald as Alison
- Gilles Marini as Jean-Michel
- Jason Gibson as Steve
- Ryan Lochte as Brad.

== Production ==
Walter's script was included in the 2008 Black List. In 2009, Michael Engler was attached to direct the film as a co-production between Anonymous Content and Overture Films.

Filming began in October 2016.

== Release ==
The film premiered at the Pacific Design Center in Los Angeles on May 3, 2017.

The film was released on DVD on May 1, 2018.

== Reception ==
On review aggregator website Rotten Tomatoes, the film holds an approval rating of 16%, based on 19 reviews, and an average rating of 4.2/10. On Metacritic, the film has a weighted average score of 49 out of 100, based on 9 critics, indicating "mixed or average" reviews.

Jeffrey M. Anderson of Common Sense Media awarded the film two stars out of five. Derek Smith of Slant Magazine awarded the film one and a half stars out of four.

Katie Walsh of the Los Angeles Times gave the film a positive review and wrote, "Stone had the right instincts about the part — she inhabits Senna beautifully, and her performance anchors the light-as-air All I Wish. It's the perfect role for her to sink her teeth into, sexy and fun, but she brings a sense of real intelligence and soulfulness to the character. That's true star power."

Adam Graham of The Detroit News graded the film a C.

Teo Bugbee of The New York Times criticized the script of the film, calling it "generic."
