= The Lance Krall Show =

- Genre: Sketch comedy
- Created by: Lance Krall
- Directed by: Grady Cooper; Lance Krall; Peter Siaggas
- Starring: Lance Krall; Annie Humphrey; Phil Cater; Sarah Baker; Anna Vocino; Loren Tarquinio; Rob Poynter; Michael Sweeney
- Theme music composer: Daniel Cossu; Jonathan Cossu
- Country of origin: United States
- Original language: English
- No. of seasons: 1
- No. of episodes: 9 (list of episodes)

Production
- Producers: Grady Cooper; Lance Krall; Rory Rosegarten; Peter Siaggas
- Cinematography: Bill Burton
- Editors: Robert Condol; Jim Issa; Lance Krall
- Production company: Lance Krall Productions Inc.

Original release
- Release: April 18 – June 6, 2005

The Lance Krall Show is a 30-minute comedy television show featuring sketches and on-the-street interaction starring Lance Krall, who gained recognition through his character Kip on The Joe Schmo Show. The Lance Krall Show aired on Spike TV Mondays at 11:05 pm, with encores Thursdays at 11:05 pm. The cast included Annie Humphrey, Phil Cater, Sarah Baker, Anna Vocino, Loren Tarquinio, Rob Poynter, and Michael Sweeney. All performed together with Krall at The Whole World Theatre in Atlanta, Georgia.

Krall is also credited as creator, director, executive producer, and editor on the show.

== Episodes ==
Episode 1

Within the first five minutes, a cast member is fired. Lance and friends watch his roommate's pornography tape, only to be shocked by his roommate's unusual fetish for office equipment. Impersonating Christopher Walken, Lance crank calls an actual restaurant and barks orders at a very flustered manager. Looks prove to be deceiving, as a booty call gets sticky. Also featured: an amateur reporter who shows up too late to catch the action, a parody of the TV show Punk'd called Trik*D!, a guy so desperate he has to rent a friend, and an epic struggle between a man and a smelly bathroom.

Episode 2

We meet Tron, the Vietnamese dry-cleaning comedian. Chu-Chi, a fake psychic who reads real people, sees the future, and it involves dead cats. While working late, an office drone goes head to head with a ninja. A “Tough Man” champion wreaks havoc on a family friendly fishing show. Also featured: a romantic “morning-after” breakfast with a revolting twist, a reporter who isn't dressed for the job, a narcoleptic on the subway, and a gay porn star prank calling a real résumé service.

Episode 3

All but one of Lance's co-workers are oblivious to his personal “activities” in his cubicle. A karate instructor uses cheap special effects to promote his third-rate karate school. A dead hippie's unusual last request turns his wake into a nightmare. Lance's sexual fantasies give way to an awkward reality when his lesbian neighbor asks him to impregnate her. Also featured: a reporter's crappy visit to a dog park, the return of Chu-Chi the psychic, an incoherent prank call to a clock shop, and real life comic-book convention nerds.

Episode 4

Two weary samurai challenge each other to a series of inept battles. An innocent April Fool's joke turns surreal. On a perfectly clear day, an amateur news reporter gets real bystanders to re-enact hurricane conditions. Also featured: a job interview for a very “special” newspaper, fraternity brothers using tough love to get a bookworm to study, Tron the dry-cleaning comedian, Lance hunting down celebrities with the aid of a star map, and Trik*d!.

Episode 5

In an attempt to raise money for his son's t-ball team, an evil boss with a horrifying deformity terrorizes his office workers. Lance, as Tron, prank calls a real advertisement director and outlines his ridiculous plan for a restaurant ad. Master Ken returns with advice on how to handle a mugging. A golfer's quest for a course record is thwarted by a bloodthirsty Ninja. A tender marriage proposal takes back seat to long fit of deja vu. Also featured: A first date that ends painfully, more jokes from Tron, a lonely lesbian searches for a friend in the park, a psychic reading goes too far when Chu Chi accuses an innocent bystander of being a murderer.

Episode 6

A hunting show camera crew discovers that beer and guns don't mix. A lounge singer's performance ends in terror as she faces the unstoppable ninja. A gospel-singing couple advertise their new album. Two businesspeople are trapped in an effort to gracefully say goodbye. A cast member's birthday present eventually leads to a triple homicide. Also featured: More jokes from Tron, a prank call to a talent agency by an untalented actor, and Lance and Michael raise the bar on pointless discussions.

Episode 7

A couple sets up a single friend with a blind date, who turns out to be the lovable but highly offensive Tron. A lunch lady must protect her kitchen from an invading Ninja. A cast member is forced to apologize to an angry viewer. The simple act of moving a water cooler turns into office warfare. Also featured: a prank call to a real dating service by a very undesirable guy, Chu Chi the psychic shocks a real person with a fake prediction about his future life as a pimp, Lance does a right-on impersonation of the wrong celebrity, and a washed-up celebrity from a canceled sitcom tries to impress nerds at a comic book convention.

Episode 8

Rednecks recall a UFO encounter that is mostly wishful thinking. The Ninja finally meets his match when he goes head to head with a naughty schoolgirl. Tron stinks up the house at a real comedy club. Lance reveals a fascinating glimpse into the making of The Lance Krall Show. Also featured: A twisted French couple, a nasty twist on the Slip and Slide, Chu-Chi tells a mom that her son is a drug dealer, and Lance prank calls a hair salon to get his “poodle” trimmed.
