= The Joe Schmo Show =

American reality television series

- Also known as: Joe Schmo 2 (season 2); The Joe Schmo Show: The Full Bounty (season 3)
- Genre: Reality television hoax
- Created by: Paul Wernick; Rhett Reese
- Starring: Ralph Garman; Cat Deeley
- Country of origin: United States
- Original language: English
- No. of seasons: 4
- No. of episodes: 39 (list of episodes)

Production
- Executive producers: J. Holland Moore; Barry Poznick; Dave Kneebone (season 4)
- Camera setup: Multi camera
- Running time: 60 minutes
- Production companies: Stone Stanley Entertainment (seasons 1–2); Reese Wernick Productions (season 2); Zoo Productions (season 3); Fly on the Wall Entertainment (season 4); MTV Entertainment Studios (season 4)

Original release
- Network: Spike
- Release: September 2, 2003 – August 10, 2004
- Release: January 8 – March 5, 2013
- Network: TBS
- Release: January 21 – March 25, 2025

The Joe Schmo Show is an American reality television hoax show created by Paul Wernick and Rhett Reese. The series was originally broadcast in the United States on the cable network Spike for two seasons in 2003 and 2004, then revived for a third season in 2013. The series was again revived for a fourth season premiering on TBS in January 2025.

== Premise ==
The show's premise is that a target person or people are led to believe that they are contestants on a reality television show; in reality, all of the other participants in the purported show – including the host – are actors, and their actions and the outcome of the purported show are all scripted in an attempt to elicit comedic reactions from the targets. The show's first season, The Joe Schmo Show, aired in 2003; its second season, Joe Schmo 2, aired in 2004; and a third season, The Joe Schmo Show: The Full Bounty, aired in 2013. The first season's hoax was conducted as a typical reality competition show while the second hoax was a Bachelor-like dating series. In the third season, the hoax featured aspiring bounty hunters tracking down "real" fugitives.

Over the course of its run, the show's cast of fake contestants has included several actors who would later become well known, including Kristen Wiig, Natasha Leggero, and Jon Huertas. The only performer consistently present across the first three Joe Schmo seasons was voice actor Ralph Garman, who served as the "emcee" for all three editions (playing a smarmier caricature of himself in the first, a pompous British man in the second, and a bounty hunter in the third).

The team behind the show also created reality television hoax show Invasion Iowa.

== Revival ==
On May 17, 2023, TBS announced that it would revive The Joe Schmo Show for a new fourth season with Cat Deeley as host, with the premiere initially planned for 2024. After a delay, the relaunch premiered on January 21, 2025. In this latest incarnation, the real and fake contestants participate in an elaborate competition known as The GOAT, a supposed Americanized adaptation of a popular (and fictitious) South Korean series.

== Episodes ==
Season	Title of Fake Show	Episodes	Originally released		
Season	Title of Fake Show	Episodes	First released	Last released	Network
1	Lap of Luxury	10	September 2, 2003	October 28, 2003	Spike
2	Last Chance for Love	9	June 15, 2004	August 10, 2004	Spike
3	The Full Bounty	10	January 8, 2013	March 5, 2013	Spike
4	The GOAT	10	January 21, 2025	March 25, 2025	TBS

=== The Joe Schmo Show (2003) ===
Joe Schmo Show season one title

The target of season one was Mt. Lebanon, Pennsylvania native Matt Kennedy Gould. The other "contestants" are archetypes of common reality TV show participants.

Character	Archetype	Actor
Ashleigh Rivera	"The Rich Bitch"	Melissa Yvonne Lewis
Brian Keith Etheridge	"The Buddy"	Brian Keith Etheridge
Carlos "Kip" Calderas	"The Gay Guy"	Lance Krall
Earl Bradford	"The Veteran"	Franklin Dennis Jones
Gina Price	"The Schemer"	Nikki Davis
Molly Crabtree	"The Virgin"	Angela Dodson
Patricia "Dr. Pat" Lane	"The Quack Marriage Counselor"	Kristen Wiig
Steve "The Hutch" Hutchison	"The Asshole"	David Hornsby
Ralph Garman	"The Smarmy Host"	Ralph Garman

Two actors made brief appearances in supporting roles: Ryan Raddatz played Molly's boyfriend, William (who feigned shock at seeing her in a bikini), and Steve Ireland played David Decker, a "network executive" who negotiated with Gould to finish the "Meal Not Quite Fit for a King" challenge.

For the hoax, the producers named the faux-reality show Lap of Luxury, with a $100,000 top prize "awarded" to the "winner." At the end of every episode, an eviction ceremony was conducted in which each contestant voted to evict someone and the person with the most votes was eliminated. After the written finish was executed, the actor in question would take a plate with their face painted on it and give it to Garman, who would then state a rhyming couplet that went "Ashes to ashes, dust to dust, (name), you're dead to us" then throw the plate into the fireplace, breaking it. In the final episode, the three remaining "players" (in this case Gould, "Brian", and "Hutch") faced a final vote from the evicted "houseguests" (similar to the final Tribal Council on Survivor), with the one getting the most votes "winning".

The show experienced an unexpected shift during an early episode. Earl ("the Veteran") had bonded with Gould. When Earl was "voted" off the show, Gould began to weep and question his possible monetary gain at the cost of competing against his new friends. Both the other "contestants" and the show's executives allegedly questioned the future of the show. While Gould was kept in the dark until the very end, the tone of the show was apparently altered (according to the voiceover of the early episodes). While the original premise had been to make situations funny at Gould's expense, it became clear that the audience would sympathize too strongly with his earnestness; later games and contests were rigged to ensure he would win.

Gould's sensitivity came to the forefront in a later episode featuring a sumo wrestling contest. Gould knocked down Kristen Wiig, playing "Dr. Pat", causing a real-life head injury that forced her to be taken to the hospital. Gould eventually won the contest but was disturbed by the incident. The next day, when Wiig returned to the show, still in character, Gould gave her the all-expense-paid spa vacation he had won earlier.

The producers added a twist in the series when Hutch was eliminated due to breaking the rules. After the said elimination he returned and (as noted above) made the final, and he was declared the "winner" just before the hoax was revealed.

In the show's October 28, 2003 finale, which aired to over 3.4 million viewers (the all-time record for a non-wrestling show on TNN/Spike up to that time), Gould learned the truth and received the $100,000 prize for which he was "competing," along with the two vacations and a new plasma TV. He later recorded commentary that was included in Mo' Joe Schmo, a rebroadcast of the series. The Joe Schmo Show was released on DVD with additional and uncensored footage in 2004.

Gould's plaintive cry, "What is going on?," delivered upon his discovery that the show was a fraud, became a popular catchphrase. Spike TV has since used the phrase at the end of the network's other original productions, some of them involving Gould himself.

Some cast members have gone on to bigger success, including Kristen Wiig, who landed a regular spot on Saturday Night Live in 2005, and also went on to co-write and star in the 2011 film Bridesmaids; Lance Krall, creator, writer and lead of VH1's Free Radio; Ralph Garman, a voice actor on Family Guy and co-host of Hollywood Babble-On; and David Hornsby, who is a writer, supervising producer, and performer on It's Always Sunny in Philadelphia.

Creator/producers Rhett Reese and Paul Wernick went on to a number of projects, including the films Zombieland and Deadpool.

=== Joe Schmo 2 (2004) ===

In 2004, Spike TV aired a second season of The Joe Schmo Show, called Joe Schmo 2 and tagged, "The Schmo must go on." Rather than duplicate the premise of the first season, producers satirized reality dating shows such as The Bachelor and The Bachelorette with a fake show called Last Chance for Love. This time the premise was to fool two people, a man and a woman. The male role was filled by Tim Walsh, while Ingrid Wiese was chosen to be the female "schmo". The series premiered on June 15, 2004.

Ralph Garman returned to host the second season as Derek Newcastle, dying his hair blond and wearing a fake beard, glasses, blue contact lenses, and false teeth plus spoke with a British accent so he would not be recognized by the new contestants.

The original "Joe Schmo," Matt Kennedy Gould, taped a cameo appearance during an episode of Joe Schmo 2 as a pizza delivery man, but the segment was cut when the network decided to shorten the episode; it did appear on the DVD. Joe Schmo 2 was released on DVD with additional and uncensored footage in 2009.

The series took an unexpected twist within minutes of its beginning when Wiese became suspicious of some of her fellow contestants (especially when one — who had only been hired for the first episode as a "contestant" to be immediately eliminated, and was not aware of the nature of the program — told Wiese that her agent had arranged for her to appear on the show). Throughout the next few episodes, Wiese began noticing additional plot holes and moments that seemed scripted. Things reached a head when the character of "Cammy", who was supposed to be telling Ingrid a secret, paused her story in order to allow the cameraman to change batteries. Wiese began openly questioning the contest, eventually stating during an interview segment that she did not believe it was real.

Since Walsh had not suspected anything was awry, the producers continued to conduct the show as it was while at the same time trying to figure out what to do with Wiese. It was finally decided that the producers would reveal to Wiese that she had correctly deduced that the entire thing was a hoax during an activity where Walsh was not present. Wiese was then made an offer: as long as she agreed to stay on the show, in effect becoming a cast member herself, and to not reveal the hoax to Walsh, she would receive the same $100,000 prize that Walsh would be given at the end of the series had he himself not figured the hoax out. Wiese agreed. In her place as the female "schmo", Upper St. Clair Township, Pennsylvania native Amanda Naughton was added to the cast. Naughton was a contestant that previously was not chosen to appear on the show.

As with the first season, the cast members portrayed characters based on archetypes common to many dating game and reality shows. Wiese was credited as the "schmo turned actress" when she was let on to the hoax.

Character	Archetype	Actor
Ambrosia	"The Bitch"	Gretchen Palmer
Austin	"The Bachelor"	Tim Herzog
Bryce	"The Stalker"	Kevin Kirkpatrick
Cammy	"The Moron"	Jana Speaker
Eleanor	"The Weeper"	Jessica Makinson
Ernie	"The Heir"	Steve Mallory
Gerald	"The Gotta-Be-Gay Guy"	Jonathan Torrens
Piper	"The Bachelorette"	Valerie Azlynn
Rita	"The Drunk"	Natasha Leggero
T.J.	"The Playah"	Jon Huertas
Ingrid	"The Schmo Turned Actress"	Ingrid Wiese
Derek Newcastle	"The Pompous Host"	Ralph Garman

Two other actors (Timothy Brennan and Robin McDonald) had supporting roles in two separate episodes. In one episode, Brennan played Piper's over-protective father, Frank, while McDonald played Piper's loving mother, Betty. The next episode featured Brennan as Austin's fun-loving father, Dallas, and McDonald as Austin's strict mother, Lois. Each "Schmo" met the pair in only one of their two sets of roles.

After revealing the hoax to her and inviting her to join the other actors, producers also gave Wiese storylines of her own, including one in which her character was accused of faking a death of a grandfather (a reference to a notorious incident on the then-recent Survivor: Pearl Islands) in a bid to win Austin's affections. At one point, she was eliminated from the show, but was later allowed to return. Tim Walsh was also evicted at one point, but this was part of the ongoing storyline, and he also rejoined the contest soon after.

The show's major ongoing plot involved the character of Bryce, who began stalking Piper, the Bachelorette, even after he was evicted twice from the show.

The series ultimately resolved itself at a "promise ceremony", attended by all the previous contestants on the show, in which Piper and Austin, who it was revealed were in fact an estranged couple, were given the choice of either promising themselves to Amanda and Tim (the last two contestants), or marrying each other. Realizing their love had not died after all, Piper and Austin agreed to marry, but the ceremony was interrupted by the manic Bryce, who proclaimed his love for Piper, and then revealed the true nature of the program. After a tense moment (the producers were prepared for the usually easy-going but sometimes irritable Tim to react badly to the revelation), Tim broke the tension by exclaiming, "Jackpot!" The moment served as a humorous callback, as Walsh had used this exclamation several times throughout the course of the season.

All three "Schmos" (Walsh, Naughton, and Wiese) received the same amount ($100,000) that Gould earned in season one, plus vacation packages they won playing contests during the show. It was also stated that a Third World child would be adopted in Walsh's name (the first episode had "Ernie" adopting a Third World child on behalf of Piper).

During the finale, Naughton recognized Natasha Leggero, one of the actresses who had been eliminated prior to Naughton's arrival, because she had seen her perform as a stand-up comic. The discovery did not derail the illusion because Naughton did not know the false identity that Leggero had created for the show, having been brought into the program after Leggero's character (Rita) had been eliminated from the program. However, Naughon's reaction to Leggero did rattle Herzog, who became visibly anxious and took a moment before recovering and proceeding with his lines.

Much of the final episode detailed the immediate aftermath of the revelation to Amanda and Tim. During the episode, Valerie Azlynn, who had portrayed "Bachelorette" Piper, tearfully expressed remorse at the hoax. Both Amanda and Tim took the revelation of the hoax in relatively good (if somewhat stunned) spirit. As of January 2013, Amanda had found romance and was going by her married name of Amanda Mason, having given birth to her first child four months previously. She stated that "her experience on the show made her feel dumb for only 30 seconds." Tim Walsh had found a wife and had two children. He had become an owner of a bar, which he later sold, then began overseeing operations at a bar, Town Hall, in Washington D.C.

=== The Joe Schmo Show: The Full Bounty (2013) ===

In January 2012, Spike TV announced it had picked up a new ten-episode series titled Full Bounty, described as "a reality competition series featuring 12 aspiring bounty hunters who risk life and limb to chase down actual fugitives".

In August 2012, it was revealed that this announcement was in fact cover for a new season of The Joe Schmo Show titled The Joe Schmo Show: The Full Bounty, which filmed in July 2012 and aired beginning on January 8, 2013. Ordered for ten episodes, with J. Holland Moore, a writer on the previous seasons, taking over as head writer and executive producer. The format featured a single contestant who believes he's in a competition to become a bounty hunter, with $100,000 at stake in a parody of bounty hunter shows such as Dog the Bounty Hunter as well as job-hunt competitions such as America's Next Top Model or The Apprentice.

The previous series host, Ralph Garman, returned this time in disguise as Jake Montrose, a seasoned bounty hunter who judged the contestant's performances. As with previous versions of the program, the other 11 contestants are actors. Included among them for the first time is a recognizable celebrity: Lorenzo Lamas, star of 1990s bounty hunter series Renegade, playing a parody of himself. An early preview for the show's return digitally blurred the new "Schmo's" face and altered his voice, so as not to reveal his identity. The name of the Schmo was later revealed to be Chase Rogan, a 28-year-old native of Pennsylvania, who is a married sports fanatic and business owner. For the third time out of three seasons of the program, a chosen Joe Schmo hails from Pittsburgh, Pennsylvania. The series premiered at 10 P.M. eastern time with two episodes. In the first episode, as he is introduced to his fellow contestants, Rogan does not actually recognize Lamas.

The cast once again featured numerous reality show archetypes:

Character/s	Archetype/s	Actor/s	Appearances
Allen	"The Buddy"	Robert Belushi	Eps. 1–10
Allison	"The Over Achieving Asian"	Nikki McKenzie	Eps. 1–6, 10
Chico	"The Ex-Con"	Lombardo Boyar	Eps. 1–10
Chloe	"The Model"	Chelsey Crisp	Eps. 1–3, 10
Karlee & Stan	"The Deaf Girl" & "The Interpreter"	Jo Newman and Fred Cross	Eps. 1–8, 10
Lavernius	"The Black Guy"	Segun Oduolowu	Eps. 1–4, 10
Lorenzo Lamas (Himself)	"The Celebrity"	Lorenzo Lamas	Eps. 1–2, 9–10
Randy	"The Asshole"	Michael Weaver	Eps. 1–8, 10
Skylar	"The Widow"	Meghan Falcone	Eps. 1–7, 10
Jake Montrose (Host)	"The Bounty Hunter"	Ralph Garman	Eps. 1–10
Wanda Montrose (Co-Host)	"The Trophy Wife"	Amanda Landry	Eps. 1–7, 10

=== The Joe Schmo Show: The GOAT (2025) ===
After a decade, the revival premiered on TBS on January 21, 2025. In this incarnation, the real and fake contestants participate in a competition known as The GOAT, a supposed Americanized adaptation of a popular (and fictitious) South Korean series, hosted by Cat Deeley. The Schmo chosen for season 4 is Ben Frisone, from Baltimore, Maryland.

The cast once again featured numerous reality show archetypes:

Character/s	Archetype/s	Actor/s
Agnes	"The Old Lady"	Lisa Fredrickson
Barbara	TBA	Frances Callier
Braxton	"The Alpha"	Londale Theus Jr.
Charles Michael	"The Conspiracy Theorist"	Ahamed Weinberg
Chastity & Trevor	"The Singing Siblings"	Jamie Hultgren and Ryan Harrison
Danielle	"The Health Guru"	Jet Eveleth
Jessica	"The Valley Girl"	Chase Bernstein
Jonathan Lipnicki (Himself)	"The Hollywood D-Bag"	Jonathan Lipnicki
Maya	"The Gamer Girl"	Natasha Mercado
Ryan	"The YouTube Prankster"	Zach Zucker
Mr. Danish	"The Creator of the GOAT"	Bruce Baek

== International versions ==
The Joe Schmo Show was produced for TV2 in New Zealand by Touchdown Television as Living The Dream in 2004. The same year, France released Gloire et Fortune : La grande imposture (Fame and fortune: The great deception). In 2006, the show arrived in Spain with the name of El Show de Cándido (The Candid Show) in season 1 and later renamed as El Show de Cándi-dos (The Candi-dos Show) in season 2 on the Spanish TV channel La Sexta by Globomedia (Promofilm).

== See also ==
- Bedsitcom – a similar British series
- Space Cadets – a similar show, revolving around potential contestants competing to go to space.
- Jury Duty – a show with a similar premise revolving around a juror participating in a fake trial. Its second season revolved around a worker at a company retreat.
- Murder in Small Town X – a 2001 series in which contestants, between competitions, interacted with performers who usually stayed in character throughout taping as a storyline progressed.
