= Party Animals (film) =

Upcoming Indian Hindi-language comedy film

- Directed by: Ravi Chhabria
- Written by: Ali Haji; Khush Mullick; Veer Panchal
- Produced by: Vikram Mehra; Siddharth Anand Kumar
- Starring: Viraj Ghelani; Arjun Tanwar; Pragati Nagpal; Naqiyah Haji
- Production company: Yoodlee Films
- Distributed by: Pen Marudhar
- Release date: November 20, 2026
- Country: India
- Language: Hindi

Party Animals is an upcoming Indian Hindi-language comedy film directed by Ravi Chhabria and produced by Vikram Mehra and Siddharth Anand Kumar under the banner of Yoodlee Films. The film stars Viraj Ghelani and Arjun Tanwar in the lead roles.

It is scheduled for theatrical release on 20 November 2026.

== Plot ==
Set on New Year’s Eve in Bombay, Party Animals follows childhood best friends Mann Patel and Armaan Khanna as their night of parties and romance spirals out of control. Their plans take them from a nightclub to a house party in a mansion, to an open double-decker party bus and eventually, a jail cell. With romantic complications, cops, goons and a runaway horse in the mix, every attempt to fix the night makes things worse. The film explores friendship, ambition and the urge to stay relevant over one night that refuses to go to plan.

== Cast ==
- Viraj Ghelani as Mann Patel
- Arjun Tanwar as Armaan Khanna
- Pragati Nagpal
- Naqiyah Haji
- Soundous Moufakir
- Alam Khan
- Saqib Ayub
- Kamlesh Sawant
- Anil Charanjeett
- Aaron Koul
- Vijay Patkar
- Manoj Joshi
- Moses Koul
- Samir Soni
- Jaanya Joshi
- Simona
- Rohan Khurana
- Aryan Prajapati
- Visshesh
- Anang Joshi
- Chhaya Vora
- Brijendra Kala
- Suresh Menon
- Sharat Saxena
- Jimmy Shergill
- Max Fernandes
- Komal Chabariya
- Vanita Kharat
- Pahal Chaudhary
- Hardik Wadhwana
- Sanvir Sachdeva
- Vianna Joshi
- Pradeep Kabra
- Prabhneet Singh
- Ali Haji
- Khush Mullick
- Veer Panchal

== Production ==
=== Development ===
The film was announced by Yoodlee Films in October 2026. Ravi Chhabria was announced as its director, with Ali Haji, Khush Mullick and Veer Panchal credited as writers.

The film’s trailer was released on October 21.

=== Filming ===
The film was primarily filmed across real locations in Mumbai.

== Release ==
Party Animals is scheduled to be released theatrically in India on 20 November 2026.
