= Anna Vocino =

American actress

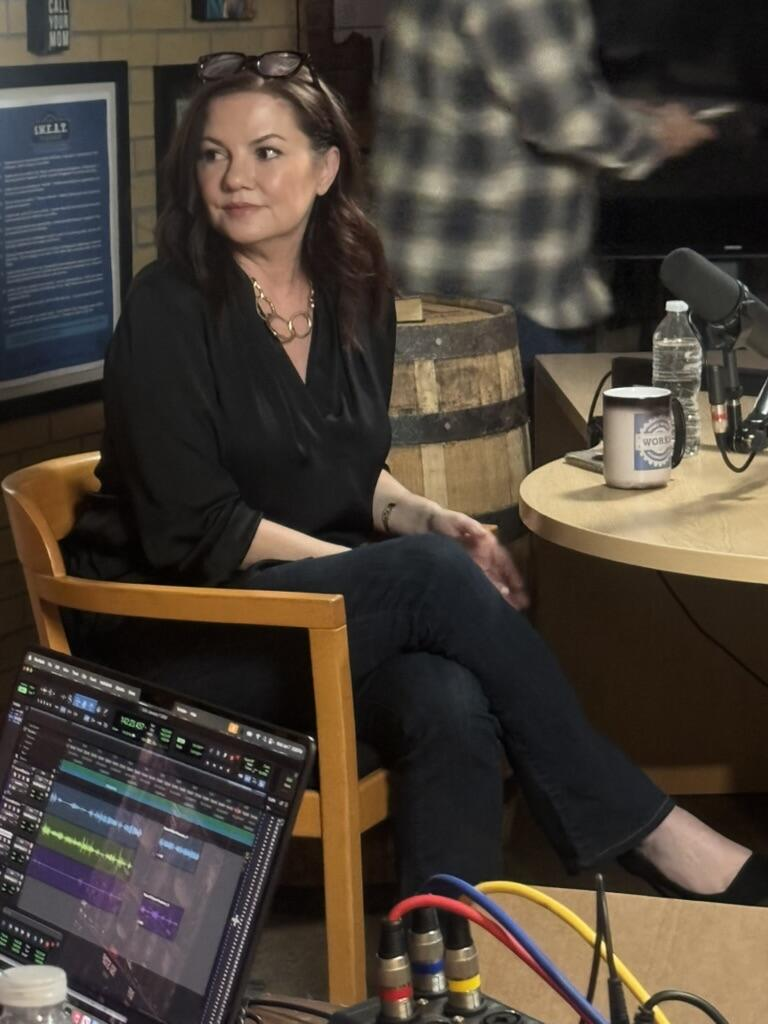
- Anna Vocino at a recording of Mike Rowe's The Way I Heard It podcast
- Occupations: Actress; comedian; author
- Years active: 1999–present
- Spouse: Loren Tarquinio (m. 1999)
- Children: 1
- Website: annavocino.com

Anna Vocino (Voh-CHEE-no) is an American actress, comedian and author of Eat Happy Kitchen cookbooks. She was the first woman to voice an entire night of national promos for the Shondaland shows for Thank God It's Thursday (T.G.I.T.) on ABC in 2015–2016, then national comedy, variety, and late-night promos for a television network, NBC, in 2019. She was a regular voice talent and character actress on Jimmy Kimmel Live! for more than a decade.

Vocino voiced Mrs. Potato Head in Toy Story 5, taking over the role following Estelle Harris's death on April 2, 2022. She shared with media that she was thrilled and a bit in "disbelief" that she landed the role and was determined to do well to do justice to the role and make both Harris's family and memory proud. Toy Story 5 recently "cleared" 20M views in its first five days on the Disney Channel, according to Deadline.

== Early life ==
She became involved in theater while attending St. Andrew's School in Middletown, Delaware, and was an uncredited extra in the film Dead Poets Society, filmed at St. Andrew's, when she was 15.

In the 1990s, she was one of eight co-founders of the Whole World Improv Theatre in Atlanta, Georgia.

== Personal life ==
Vocino married comedy writer Loren Tarquinio in 1999, and they have one child together.

== Corkscrew Comedy Festival ==
In 2025, she and Tarquinio co-founded and star in the Corkscrew Comedy Festival in the Santa Ynez Valley. The 2025 festival raised funds for the Santa Ynez Valley Humane Society, a socially conscious shelter that helps animals in need. The 2026 Festival is set for June 18–20.

== Eat Happy Kitchen ==
In 2002, Vocino was diagnosed with celiac disease and has been a vocal resource and supporter for helping people figure out what to eat on a gluten-free diet. In 2012, Vocino began co-hosting the Fitness Confidential podcast with Vinnie Tortorich. This led her to refocus her gluten-free recipes on low-carb options. She released the first Eat Happy cookbook in 2016. Eat Happy Too was released in 2019. Then Eat Happy Italian was published in 2024 (Benbella Books/Simon & Schuster). Eat Happy Cocktail Hour is set to release on October 13, 2026 (Benbella Books/Simon & Schuster).

In 2020, Vocino founded Eat Happy Kitchen, with her marinara sauce as its flagship product. As of 2026, Eat Happy Kitchen now sells pasta sauce, spice blends, and high-protein cheese bites either directly to consumers or at 1,300+ retailers in the United States.

She has said that her mission is to help clean up food labels in grocery stores, help her audience get off sugar and processed foods, and enjoy recipes made with real food again. She has shared these messages with Mike Rowe on The Way I Heard It, with Andy Cohen on What Happens Live!, and many other news outlets.

== Filmography ==
=== Film ===
Year	Title	Role	Notes
2007	A New Tomorrow	Zara	
2010	Breast Picture	Wanda	
2015	The Worst Year of My Life	Kyle's Mother	
2016	Batman: The Killing Joke	Jeannie	
2017	Deep	Norma	
2019	Batsh*t Bride	Voicemail	
2020	Superman: Red Son	Tour Guide (voice)	
2024	Guy Friends	Customer (voice)	
2026	Toy Story 5	Mrs. Potato Head (voice)	Replacing the late Estelle Harris

=== Television ===
Year	Title	Role	Notes
1999–2000	Whole World Comedy	Various	
2005	The Lance Krall Show	Various	8 episodes
2007	Celebrity Deathmatch	Kirsten Dunst (voice)	1 episode
2008–2009	Free Radio	Anna	17 episodes
2009	It's Always Sunny in Philadelphia	Fay	1 episode
2012	Childrens Hospital	Mom	1 episode
2014	The Crazy Ones	Helen	1 episode
2014	The Doctors	Helen	1 episode
2012–2015	Austin & Ally	Cheeri	Voice
2016	11.22.63	Jackie Kennedy (voice)	Uncredited
2016–17	Ben 10	Nanny Nightmare, Security Guard (voice)	2 episodes
2016–18	DC Super Hero Girls	Oracle, Old Woman (voice)	5 episodes
2017	Sofia the First	Miss Nettle (voice)	1 episode
2017	Squidbillies	Innocence Project Lawyer	
2017	Extinct	Yellow Drone (voice)	10 episodes
2017–2018	Spirit Riding Free	Althea (voice)	5 episodes
2018	Butterbean's Cafe	Mrs. Learnerbrook, Mrs. Dollop	4 episodes
2019	Trolls: The Beat Goes On!	Hairdresser (voice)	1 episode
2020	Spirit Riding Free: Riding Academy	Althea (voice)	1 episode
2020	Kipo and the Age of Wonderbeasts	Greta, Porcelaine (voice)	13 episodes
2021	Blade Runner: Black Lotus	Russian Babushka (voice, English version)	1 episodes
2009–23	Jimmy Kimmel Live!	Alexa (voiceover), Audience Confessions (voiceover), Oprah Tears, Announcer	47 episodes
2017–25	Snapped: Killer Couples	Narrator	88 episodes

=== Video games ===
Year	Title	Voice role	Notes
2004	World of Warcraft		
2006	Tom Clancy's Splinter Cell: Double Agent	U.S. Marshal	
2009	Grey's Anatomy: The Video Game		
2009	inFamous	Female Pedestrian	
2010	10 Minute Solution	Helpful Female Trainer	
2010	Starcraft II: Wings of Liberty	Annabelle, Confederate Adjutant	
2011	TERA: The Exiled Realm of Aborea	Additional Voices	
2011	Dead Space	Vandal	
2011	Dead Space 2	Additional Voices	
2011	Dungeon Siege III	Katarina, Additional Voices	
2011	Final Fantasy XIII-2	Historia Crux, Narrator, Additional Voices	English version
2012	Kingdoms of Amalur: Reckoning	Adessa Citizen, Templar, Jorielle, Ani Gunnar	
2012	Asura's Wrath	Olga	English version
2012	Warhammer Online: Wrath of Heroes	Aessa	
2012	Lego Batman 2: DC Super Heroes	Vicki Vale, Katana	
2012	Lego the Lord of the Rings	Incidental Hobbits	
2012	Guardians of Middle-Earth	System Voice, Eowyn	
2013	Star Trek	T'Mar	Uncredited
2014	Hearthstone: Heroes of Warcraft		
2014	inFamous: Second Son	Activist	
2014	The Elder Scrolls Online	Kiseravi, Mell the Musical Tasnasi	
2014	Wildstar	Artemis Zin, Casian Female, Exile Female	
2016	World of Warcraft: Legion	Voice	
2016	Final Fantasy XV	Monica Elshett, Additional Voices	English version
2017	Halo Wars 2	Additional Voices	
2017	Prey	Additional Voices	
2017	Agents of Mayhem	Agent Joule (Cosima Bellini)	
2017	Dishonored Death of the Outsider	Elite Guards	
2017	Final Fantasy XV: Comrades	Monica Elshett	English version
2018	Sushi Striker: The Way of Sushido	Purrsilla	
2018	Prey: Mooncrash	Station Announcer	
2018	World of Warcraft: Battle for Azeroth		
2019	Days Gone	Additional Voices	
2020	Final Fantasy VII Remake	Additional Voices	English version
2020	The Last of Us: Part II	Additional Voices	
2021	Psychonauts 2	Donatella Aquato, Lori, Nurse Barr, Others	
2022	Saints Row	Myra Starr, Chief Michaels, AI Secretary	
2023	Diablo IV	Additional Voices	
2023	Harry Potter: Magic Awakened		
2024	Final Fantasy VII Rebirth	Additional Voices	English version
2024	The Elder Scrolls Online: Gold Road		
2025	Skin Deep	Pirate A	

=== Videography ===
Year	Title	Role	Notes
2010	Asperger's High	Narrator	
2015	Myrbetriq: Bowling		
2016	DC Super Hero Girls: Hero of the Year	Oracle	Voice
2017	DC Super Hero Girls: Intergalactic Games	Oracle	Voice
