= I Trust You to Kill Me (film) =

- Directed by: Manu Boyer
- Produced by: MRB Productions
- Starring: David Beste; Rayan Carman; Greg Velasquez
- Distributed by: 3DD Entertainment; First Independent Pictures
- Release date: 2006
- Running time: 105 minutes
- Country: United States
- Language: English
- Box office: $12,854

I Trust You To Kill Me, released in January 2006, is a documentary film directed by Manu Boyer and featuring the California band Rocco DeLuca and the Burden and Canadian actor Kiefer Sutherland, who acted as the band's tour manager during their 2006 European tour. The band is currently signed to Sutherland's independent record label Ironworks.

Originally broadcast in the UK on Sky One in February 2006, it has also been released on DVD in North America (NTSC) and broadcast on the American cable television channel VH1.
