= Ali Hajji =

Ali Hajji or Ali Haji (Persian: علي حاجي) may refer to:

- Ali-Hajji of Akusha (1847–1930), North Caucasian leader during the Russian Civil War
- Ali Haji (actor) (born 1999), Indian actor
- Ali Hajji, West Azerbaijan, village in Iran

== See also ==
- Ali Haji Warsame (born 1964), Somali entrepreneur and politician
