= Francesca Gregorini =

Italian-American screenwriter and film director

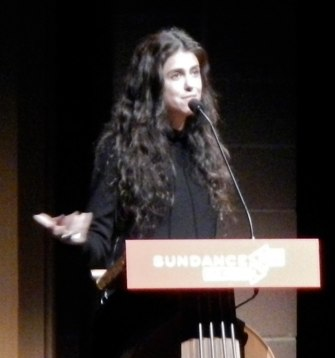
- Gregorini in 2015
- Born: Francesca McKnight Donatella Romana Gregorini di Savignano di Romagna; August 7, 1968 (age 58); Rome, Italy
- Occupations: Film director; screenwriter
- Years active: 2001–present
- Partner: Morgan Marling (2014–present)
- Mother: Barbara Bach
- Relatives: Ringo Starr (stepfather); Zak Starkey (stepbrother)

Francesca McKnight Donatella Romana Gregorini di Savignano di Romagna (born August 7, 1968) is an Italian-American screenwriter and film director.

== Early life ==
Born in Rome, Gregorini is the daughter of former "Bond girl" Barbara Bach and businessman Augusto Gregorini Savignano di Romagna from Savignano sul Rubicone. Her mother (born Barbara Goldbach) is of Jewish and Irish descent. Gregorini is the stepdaughter of Beatles drummer Ringo Starr, with whom she is close. After boarding at TASIS, she attended Brown University, graduating in 1990.

== Career ==
Gregorini contributed two songs to the soundtrack of the film See Jane Run (2001), in which she also had a small acting role. She worked as a musician with her first CD, Sequel (2003), where she sings, and plays the guitar and bass.

Gregorini sold scripts to both HBO and Paramount Pictures before co-helming, with Princess Tatiana von Fürstenberg, her directorial debut Tanner Hall, a coming of age story set in an all-girls boarding school in Rhode Island, starring Rooney Mara. Gregorini and von Fürstenberg also co-wrote the independent film, loosely based on their own adolescent experiences. Gregorini said in an interview, "Naturally there are some autobiographical elements, combined with things we'd witness in boarding school, and many other parts that we made up completely. You will certainly find characteristics of both of us in each of the four main girls and if you spend even a half-hour with us, it will be very apparent to you, which girls are most like me and which ones are most like Tatiana." The film was an official selection at the 2009 Toronto International Film Festival.

Gregorini's film The Truth About Emanuel – starring Jessica Biel, Kaya Scodelario and Alfred Molina – was selected for the US dramatic competition at the 2013 Sundance Film Festival.

In summer 2018, The Hollywood Reporter wrote that Killing Eve creator Phoebe Waller-Bridge hired Gregorini as a director for the show's second series.

In January 2020, Francesca Gregorini filed a lawsuit against Servant producers including Tony Basgallop and M. Night Shyamalan, the production companies involved, and Apple TV+, alleging copyright infringement for The Truth About Emanuel. Basgallop and Shyamalan responded that neither had seen her film and that any similarity is coincidence. On May 28, 2020, a federal judge threw out the copyright lawsuit against Shyamalan and Apple, ruling that the TV show is not similar enough to the film to merit a lawsuit. On July 21, 2020, the court ordered Gregorini to pay the defendants' attorneys' fees of $162,467.30. In February 2022, the United States Court of Appeals for the Ninth Circuit determined that the lawsuit was dismissed prematurely, as the discovery steps had not been properly carried out, ruling "'reasonable minds could differ' on whether the stories are substantially similar." In 2025, a federal jury ruled unanimously in the defendants' favor.

== Personal life ==
Gregorini was in a relationship with actress Portia de Rossi from 2000 to 2004.
