= Lance Krall =

American actor (born 1970)

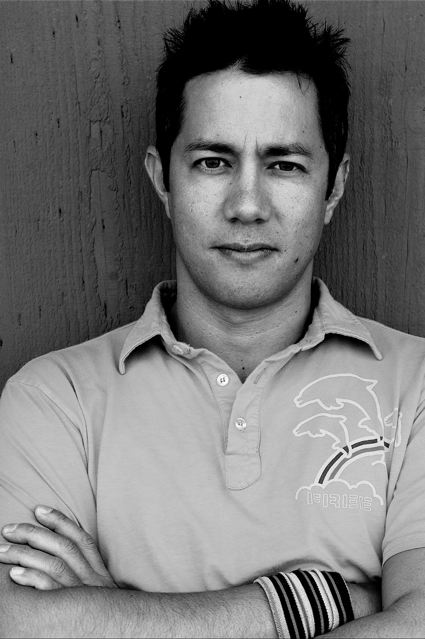
- Born: December 9, 1970 (age 55); Monterey, California, U.S.
- Occupations: Producer; screenwriter; actor
- Height: 5 ft 8 in (173 cm)
- Spouse: Brittany (m. 2008)
- Children: 2

Lance Krall (born December 9, 1970) is an American producer, screenwriter, and actor. He became well known after his portrayal as "Kip" in the role in faux-reality show The Joe Schmo Show. He went on to create and star in The Lance Krall Show and Free Radio. He is the co-founder of Picture It Productions, a television development and production company based in Atlanta.

== Early life and education ==
Krall was born in Monterey, California. Because his father, John Krall, was a Naval aviator, and his mother, Vietnamese-born Yung Krall, was a spy for the CIA, Lance frequently moved homes. Government and military life shuffled Lance and his family to California, Hawaii, Saigon, London, Paris, Frankfurt, Washington, D.C., and New Mexico. Krall's family finally retired from government life in 1983 and settled in Georgia. Krall attended Shiloh High School and Georgia State University.

== Career ==
After obtaining his B.A. in film and theater at Georgia State University, Krall helped found The Whole World Theatre in Atlanta. From 1993 to 2000, Krall performed in improv shows and scripted plays at Whole World.

In 1999, Krall was spotted by a Hollywood talent agent, and moved out west. In late 2000 he was cast on Steve Martin's variety show, The Downer Channel. After a disappointing four-episode run, Krall tried his luck at shooting his own sketch comedy show. With the help of his old troupe in Atlanta, Krall shot a thirty-minute pilot named The Lance Krall Show.

In the interim, Krall was cast in the feature Made-Up, directed by Tony Shalhoub, and later directed and starred in Party Animals that premiered at the Los Angeles International Film Festival and was an official selection in the Slamdance Film Festival in Park City, Utah.

In 2003, Krall was cast as Kip, a gay Cuban, in the reality show parody The Joe Schmo Show. His popularity on Joe Schmo convinced Spike TV to greenlight eight episodes of The Lance Krall Show.

Krall then created and starred in the television show, Free Radio, which aired for two seasons on VH1 and Comedy Central. Free Radio was a behind-the-scenes look at a struggling Los Angeles radio station and its dysfunctional staff. Krall starred as the dimwitted,ignorant, yet inexplicably popular host of "Moron in the Morning." Celebrity guests from film, television, music and stage joined the cast every week in the booth as they promote their latest projects while enduring Krall's clueless questions and oblivious take on the world.

In 2011, Krall partnered with American skateboarder, Tony Hawk, to produce, write, and star in a television pilot called, "Crash & Burn." It is an ensemble comedy set in the world of Hollywood stunt performers and also stars Lee Majors as a legendary stunt man and leader of the Crash & Burn stunt team. Krall was also featured on Tony Hawk's YouTube channel, "Ride."

In 2012, Krall wrote and starred on Fox's Breaking In, and was a writer for the ABC sitcom Last Man Standing.

Krall co-wrote the feature The Layover, with fellow It's Always Sunny in Philadelphia writer, David Hornsby. The film, directed by William H. Macy and starring Alexandra Daddario and Kate Upton, was released in 2017.

In 2016, Krall co-founded Picture It Productions, a television production company based in Atlanta, Georgia, specializing in developing television shows based on real life stories from the South, as well as developing Atlanta-based talent. In its first two years, Picture It has sold six scripted shows to various broadcast, cable, and streaming platforms, including Fox, CBS, ABC, PopTV, and pocket.watch. In 2019, Picture It entered into a two-year first look deal with CBS TV Studios.

In 2021, Krall joined Dagger, an Atlanta full-service creative agency, as VP, Group Creative Director. In 2022, the agency launched Dagger Originals, a TV development company, adding Head of TV to Krall’s title. The endeavor reunited Krall with Tara Ochs, Head of Development for Dagger Originals, who launched Picture It Productions in 2016. During Picture it Production’s four-year run, the pair worked with producers such as Jerry Bruckheimer, Laurence Fishburne and Drew Barrymore, as well as CBS Studios.

Lance Krall also holds a third degree black belt in Tae Kwon Do and was ranked 6th in the nation in 1992. As a trainer, Krall coached several Junior Olympic gold medalists. In November 2005, Krall appeared as the karate instructor during Michael and Dwight's match in "The Fight" episode of The Office. He repeated the role in "Junior Salesman" in 2013.

== Personal life ==
Lance Krall married Brittany Krall in 2008. They have two children, Lyla and Ronin Krall.

== Filmography ==
=== TV ===
- (2013) It's Always Sunny in Philadelphia - written by
- (2012) Last Man Standing - written by
- (2012) Breaking In ~ Ricky Borten - also written by
- (2007–2009) Free Radio ~ DJ Lance - also executive producer, written by, edited by
- (2006) The Other Mall ~ Truc Tran (pilot) - also executive producer, written by, and edited by
- (2005, 2012) The Office ~ Sensei Ira (Episodes: "The Fight", "Junior Salesman")
- (2005) The Lance Krall Show ~ Series Lead (8 episodes) - also executive producer, directed by, written by, and edited by
- (2003–2004) Monk ~ Guest Star (2 episodes)
- (2003) The Joe Schmo Show ~ Kip Calderas (9 episodes)
- (2003) Hotel ~ Orlando Vargas (pilot)
- (2001) The Downer Channel ~ Series Regular (6 episodes)
- (2000) The Cindy Margolis Show ~ Co-Host (15 episodes)

=== Films ===
- (2017) The Layover - writer
- (2005) The Life Coach
- (2003) Party Animals - also executive producer, directed by, written by, and edited by
- (2002) Juwanna Mann
- (2002) Made-Up
