= Zombieland (franchise) =

Media franchise

- Created by: Rhett Reese; Paul Wernick
- Original work: Zombieland (2009)
- Owners: Columbia Pictures (Sony Pictures Entertainment); Pariah
- Years: 2009–present

Films and television
- Films: Zombieland (2009); Zombieland: Double Tap (2019)

Games
- Video games: Zombieland: Double Tap – Road Trip (2019); Zombieland: Headshot Fever (2021)

Zombieland is an American media franchise centering on a college-aged kid making his way through the zombie apocalypse, meeting three strangers along the way and together taking an extended road trip across the Southwestern United States in an attempt to find a sanctuary free from zombies over the following decades. It consists of two films and two tie-in-games. The films are produced by Pariah and 2.0 Entertainment, a division of Sony Pictures Releasing under its Columbia Pictures. The series features Woody Harrelson, Jesse Eisenberg, Emma Stone, and Abigail Breslin as survivors of a zombie apocalypse. Two films have been released in the series thus far: the original film of the same name in 2009, and a sequel Zombieland: Double Tap in 2019.

== Films ==
| Film | U.S. release date | Director | Screenwriters | Producer(s) |
|---|---|---|---|---|
| Zombieland | October 2, 2009 | Ruben Fleischer | Rhett Reese, Paul Wernick | Gavin Polone |
| Zombieland: Double Tap | October 18, 2019 | Ruben Fleischer | Reese, Wernick, and David Callaham | Gavin Polone |

=== Zombieland (2009) ===
Two months have passed since a strain of mad cow disease mutated into "mad person disease" that became "mad zombie disease", which overran the entire United States (with the infection presumably spreading to the rest of the world), turning many Americans into vicious zombies. Survivors of the zombie epidemic have learned that growing attached to other survivors is not advisable because they could die at any moment, so many have taken to using their city of origin as nicknames.

=== Zombieland: Double Tap (2019) ===
Zombieland: Double Tap takes place ten years after the first film. The four main characters from the first film decide to move into the White House.

=== Future ===
On the possibility of a third film, Fleischer can not decide if the cast will return or not. He has stated that he "would love to do a Madison stand-alone movie." In 2025, Fleischer expressed hope that a third film could be done in 2029.

== Television ==
In October 2011, it was reported that Fox Broadcasting Company and Sony Pictures were considering a television adaption of the series to be aired on CBS, with Paul Wernick and Rhett Reese writing the script, but with the main actors of the original film likely not returning. The television program was planned to begin in Fall 2012. These plans did not come to fruition. In January 2013, it was revealed that the casting call for the production just went out for the main characters, with a few changes to the movie for the show and the addition of two new characters, Atlanta and Ainsley. There was a pilot episode created and aired by Amazon along with several other pilots, but it was not one of the 2 chosen to go into production for a full season.

== Video games ==
=== Tie-in Mobile Games ===
iZombieland is an action game for iPhone OS developed and published by Sony Pictures Mobile, initially released on September 21, 2009, as a promotional tie-in for the first film. In an October 7, 2009 review, Levi Buchanan of IGN gave the game a "good" score of 7.4 out of 10.

Zombieland: AFK Survival (originally released as Zombieland: Double Tapper) is a free-to-play mobile idle role-playing video game for iOS and Android based on Sony Pictures' Zombieland franchise. Developed by Metagame Studios and Tilting Point and published by Sony Pictures Mobile, it was released on October 15, 2019, under its original title to promote the second film and features characters Columbus, Tallahassee, Wichita, and Little Rock alongside new characters across a post-apocalyptic road trip.

=== Zombieland: Headshot Fever ===
Zombieland: Headshot Fever is a virtual reality shooter game released in 2021. A remastered version, titled Zombieland: Headshot Fever Reloaded, was released in 2023 as a PSVR2 launch title. Push Square gave it a positive review saying "[...] it doesn't push the medium any further, but if you're looking for a straight-to-the-point zombie shooter, you can't really go wrong."

== Reception ==
=== Box office performance ===
| Film | Release Date | Box Office Gross | | | All Time Ranking | | Budget | References |
| Film | Release Date | Domestic | Foreign | Worldwide | Domestic | Worldwide | Budget | References |
|---|---|---|---|---|---|---|---|---|
| Zombieland | October 2, 2009 | $75,590,286 | $26,801,794 | $102,392,080 | 23 | 60 | $23.6 million | |
| Zombieland: Double Tap | October 18, 2019 | $73,123,082 | $49,687,317 | $122,810,399 | 336 | 293 | $42 million | |
| Total | | $148,713,368 | $76,489,111 | $225,202,479 | | | $65.6 million | |

=== Critical and public response ===
Critical and public response of Zombieland
| Film | Critical | | Public |
| Film | Rotten Tomatoes | Metacritic | CinemaScore |
|---|---|---|---|
| Zombieland | 89% (255 reviews) | 73 (31 reviews) | A- |
| Zombieland: Double Tap | 68% (258 reviews) | 55 (38 reviews) | B+ |

== Cast and characters ==
List indicators

This section includes characters who will appear or have appeared in the franchise.

- An empty grey cell indicates the character was not in the film, or that the character's official presence has not yet been confirmed.
- ^{C} indicates a cameo role.
- ^{V} indicates a voice-only role.

| Character | Film | | Pilot |
| Character | Zombieland | Zombieland: Double Tap | Zombieland |
| Character | 2009 | 2019 | 2013 |
|---|---|---|---|
| Tallahassee | Woody Harrelson | Woody Harrelson | Kirk Ward |
| Columbus | Jesse Eisenberg | Jesse Eisenberg | Tyler Ross |
| Wichita / Krista | Emma Stone | Emma Stone | Maiara Walsh |
| Little Rock | Abigail Breslin | Abigail Breslin | Izabela Vidovic |
| Bill Murray | Himself^{C} | Himself^{C} | |
| 406 | Amber Heard | | |
| Gas Station Clerk | Mike White | | |
| Nevada | | Rosario Dawson | |
| Madison | | Zoey Deutch | |
| Berkeley | | Avan Jogia | |
| Albuquerque | | Luke Wilson | |
| Flagstaff | | Thomas Middleditch | |
| Detroit | | | Kendra Fountain^{v} |
