= Zombieland: Double Tap – Road Trip =

2019 shoot 'em up video game developed by High Voltage Software

- North American Nintendo Switch cover art
- Developer: High Voltage Software
- Publishers: NA: GameMill Entertainment; EU: Maximum Games
- Producer: Mike Heflin
- Designer: Dav Harnish
- Programmer: Beth Towns
- Artist: Damion Davis
- Writer: Dav Harnish
- Series: Zombieland
- Engine: Unity
- Platforms: Microsoft Windows; Nintendo Switch; PlayStation 4 Xbox One
- Release: October 15, 2019
- Genre: Shoot 'em up
- Modes: Single-player, multiplayer

Zombieland: Double Tap – Road Trip is a shoot 'em up video game developed by High Voltage Software and published by GameMill Entertainment in North America and Maximum Games in Europe. It is based on the Zombieland film of the same name, and was released on October 15, 2019, for Microsoft Windows, Nintendo Switch, PlayStation 4, and Xbox One, three days before Zombieland: Double Tap's US release.

== Plot ==
The story is set between the events of Zombieland and Zombieland: Double Tap.

== Gameplay ==
The gameplay utilizes a top-down isometric view similar to Contra: Rogue Corps. The gameplay modes are campaign and horde modes which can be played in single-player or multiplayer cooperative (with up to four players). It is based on player versus environment (PvE) gameplay, with dual analog sticks (analog stick and directional pad in optional horizontal Joy-Con gameplay for the Switch version).

As Columbus, Tallahassee, Little Rock, Wichita, or unlockable characters from the films, players carry a main weapon that can be changed by using weapon boxes. The single pistol has unlimited ammunition. During gameplay, players can find other weapons to replace their main one, and explosives to use as sub-weapons. Characters' stats, including attack damage, weapon uses/ammo, max health, movement speed, and special meter fill rate, are upgraded between stages. As a last resort, players can use their character's special ability once their special meter is full.

== Development ==
The game was announced on July 30, 2019. Abigail Breslin, who reprises her role as Little Rock from the films, previewed the game on October 10, 2019.

== Reception ==
Reception

Aggregate score
| Aggregator | Score |
|---|---|
| Metacritic | 39% |

Review scores
| Publication | Score |
|---|---|
| Nintendo Life | 3/10 |
| Eurogamer (Italy) | 4/10 |

On Metacritic, the PlayStation 4 version of Zombieland: Double Tap – Road Trip received a score of 39% based on five reviews, indicating "generally unfavorable" reviews.

Nintendo Life criticized the game for its short length, gameplay, level design, and price.
