= Chelsey Crisp =

American actress, comedian, and writer

- Occupations: Actress, comedian, writer
- Years active: 2004–present
- Spouse: Rhett Reese (m. 2016)
- Children: 2
- Website: chelseycrisp.com

Chelsey Crisp is an American actress, comedian, and writer. She is best known for her role as Honey Ellis on the ABC television sitcom Fresh Off the Boat.

== Early life ==
Crisp attended the American Academy of Dramatic Arts from 2001 to 2003. After graduating, she studied Shakespeare at the British American Dramatic Academy's Midsummer in Oxford program.

== Career ==
She made her TV debut on Scare Tactics (2004) and her first leading role in a film was in Dr. Chopper (2005). She went on to guest star in The Office, CSI: Miami, Journeyman, Better off Ted, Happy Endings, Rizzoli & Isles, Mike & Molly, and New Girl, among others. Crisp also starred as Chloe, one of the contestants on the mock reality game show, The Joe Schmo Show.

Crisp starred in the ABC comedy series Fresh Off the Boat as the Huang family's neighbor, Honey. Fresh off the Boat is inspired by the life of chef and food personality Eddie Huang and his book Fresh Off the Boat: A Memoir. On May 12, 2017, ABC renewed the series for a fourth season.

Crisp had roles in films Reconciliation (2009), Bleed (2016) and The 60 Yard Line (2016). She portrayed Jesse in the Christian-themed romantic comedy film In-Lawfully Yours (2016). The film centers around Jesse, played by Crisp, who graciously helps her recently widowed mother-in-law.

Crisp is the artistic director and member of the comedy team Duchess Riot, formed in 2011, that performs improv and sketch comedy.

== Personal life ==
In November 5, 2016, Crisp married screenwriter Rhett Reese. By 2017, they were living in Los Angeles. In a January 2020 interview, Reese said that they had recently purchased a condominium in Paradise Valley, Arizona. Crisp gave birth to their first child in January 2022, and later gave birth to their second child.

== Filmography ==
=== Film ===
Year	Title	Role	Notes
2005	Dr. Chopper	Jessica	
2008	An American Standard	Tanya	Short film
2009	Reconciliation	Sarah Taylor	
2011	Nifty Lessons for a Swell Life	AD	Short film; also co-executive producer
2012	Madchen	Jenn	Short film
2013	Chicken Suit	Riley	Short film
2014	10 Things I Hate About Life	Willow's Mom	Unfinished and unreleased
2016	Bleed	Sarah	
2016	The 60 Yard Line	Jody Johnson	
2016	In-Lawfully Yours	Jesse	
2017	The Outdoorsman	Kelsie	
2017	Sludge	Emma	
2018	Surviving Theater 9	Megan	Short film
2018	Life with Dog	Zoey	
2025	Eenie Meanie	Ma Meaney	
2026	Balls Up	Eco Warrior Julie	

=== Television ===
Year	Title	Role	Notes
2004	Scare Tactics	Hostess, Massage Therapist	Episodes: "Party Forever" & "The Set-Up"
2006	Extra	Host: Fear Factor Live	
2006	Why Can't I Be You?	Plain Jane	Episode: "Plain Jane"
2006	Threshold	Danielle	Episode: "Alienville"
2006	The Office	Convention Worker	Episode: "The Convention"
2007	CSI: Miami	Shelly Seaver	Episode: "Born to Kill"
2007	Journeyman	Maggie	Episodes: "Home by Another Way" & "Blowback"
2008	NCIS	Grace Penland	Episode: "Collateral Damage"
2009	Better Off Ted	Nadine Webson	Episode: "The Lawyer, the Lemur & the Little Listener"
2010	Desire and Deceit	Sierra Longacre	
2011	McCracken Live!	Sherrie Shaw	Episodes: "Carol Ann Sizzles" & "The Interview"
2012	Adopting Terror	Receptionist	TV movie
2012	Happy Endings	Candice	Episode: "P&P Romance Factory"
2012	Rizzoli & Isles	Vanessa Jensen	Episode: "Virtual Love"
2013	We Are Men	Nurse No. 1	Episode: "We Are Wingmen"
2013	Mike & Molly	Marla	Episode: "Molly's New Shoes"
2013	The Joe Schmo Show	Chloe, The Model	Series regular
2013	#Instafamous	Mindy Bankson	Episode: "Elf on a Shelf" (web)
2013	Couchers	Amanda	Episode: "The Paranormally Active Lady"
2013	New Girl	Brandy	Episode: "First Date"
2013	Marvin Marvin	Host	Episode: "Big Time Marvin"
2014	Rake	Colleen Rinaldi	Episode: "Bigamist"
2014	A to Z	Brooke	Episode: "B is for Big Glory"
2014	Adult All Girl Sexy Sleep Over Party	Katie	Series regular (web)
2015	The Grinder	Reporter No. 1	Pilot
2015	What's Your Emergency	Madison	Episode: "Shot Through the Heart" (web)
2015	The League	JoBeth	Episode: "Trophy Kevin"
2015–2020	Fresh Off the Boat	Honey	Series regular
2021	Young Rock	Casey	
2021	CSI: Vegas	Emma Hodges	Episode: "Honeymoon in Vegas" & "Under the Skin"
2022	Ten Percent	Kirsten Furst	Series regular
2026	Twenty Twenty Six	Sarah Campbell	Series regular
