= Eenie Meanie (film) =

2025 film by Shawn Simmons

- Release poster
- Directed by: Shawn Simmons
- Written by: Shawn Simmons
- Produced by: Rhett Reese; Paul Wernick; Marty Ewing
- Starring: Samara Weaving; Karl Glusman; Jermaine Fowler; Marshawn Lynch; Steve Zahn; Andy Garcia
- Cinematography: Tim Ives
- Edited by: Dirk Westervelt; Chris Patterson
- Music by: Bobby Krlic
- Production companies: 20th Century Studios; Reese/Wernick Productions
- Distributed by: Hulu
- Release date: August 22, 2025
- Running time: 106 minutes
- Country: United States
- Language: English
- Budget: $50 million

Eenie Meanie is a 2025 American action heist comedy thriller film written and directed by Shawn Simmons, in his feature directorial debut. Samara Weaving leads an ensemble cast that includes Karl Glusman, Jermaine Fowler, Marshawn Lynch, Steve Zahn, and Andy Garcia. It was released on Hulu on August 22, 2025.

== Plot ==
In 2007 Cleveland, fourteen-year-old Edie Meaney is pulled over by police while driving her drunk parents home from buying drugs at a bar. To save them from prison, Edie's father urges her to speed away, but she crashes the car. Her mother is killed and her father is left a paraplegic, while Edie survives a series of abusive foster homes until she is rescued by John, a young petty criminal. Falling in love, Edie and John carry out numerous robberies for mob boss Nico, who nicknames her "Eenie Meanie".

Fourteen years later, Edie has left her life as a getaway driver behind, and finally broken up with John. Working at a bank to put herself through community college, she is knocked unconscious during a robbery; taken to the hospital, she learns she is pregnant. Against her better judgement, Edie visits John, who is being interrogated by Nico's goons, and reluctantly uses her driving skills to save him.

John reveals he has kidnapped Leo, a card counter in Nico's employ, who refused to help him with a scheme behind Nico's back. Edie demands that they make amends, but Leo is accidentally killed by a passing truck. Furious to be pulled back into John's poor decisions, Edie meets with Nico and his right-hand man George, who hold John accountable for the loss of Leo's earnings. In exchange for sparing John's life, Nico forces Edie to accept a job: stealing a car containing $3 million in cash, the prize for an upcoming poker tournament at a casino in Toledo.

The heist's planning is overseen at Gary's bar by the Chaperone, who considers John a liability, but Edie remains loyal to her ex-boyfriend. With inside help from casino staff and a series of payoffs, the prize Dodge Charger is replaced with an identical model outfitted for the robbery. At the casino, Edie and John run into rival getaway driver Perm Walters, but Nico assures them he is not involved. Suspicious, Edie and John reach out to her father for help, but he has made a reformed life for himself and his new family. Edie tells John she is pregnant, and they spend a romantic night together.

The tournament concludes as the prize money is loaded into the car, and Edie manages to drive the bulletproof Charger off the casino floor. Leading police on a high-speed chase, she is intercepted by Perm. John flips his own car in pursuit and Edie stops to pull him from the wreck, as Perm takes off in the Charger. Failing to find a hidden tracker, Perm is killed in a shootout with John. Edie delivers the cash to Gary and the Chaperone as planned, but John kills them in a desperate plan for him and Edie to take the money for themselves. Realizing his mistake, John promises to change his reckless ways, but Edie shoots him dead.

She brings the money to Nico, who has overlooked George skimming from him for years, but he is heartbroken to realize that George hired Perm. Sharing her childhood dream of a home with more than one bathroom, Edie leaves with a share of the money as Nico disposes of George. Some time later, Edie has started her own auto repair business and a new life with her son.

== Cast ==
- Samara Weaving as Edie Meaney / Eenie Meanie
  - Elle Graham as young Edie
- Karl Glusman as John
- Andy Garcia as Nico
- Steve Zahn as Dad Meaney
- Jermaine Fowler as The Chaperone
- Marshawn Lynch as Perm Walters
- Mike O'Malley as George
- Kyanna Simone as Baby Girl
- Randall Park as Leo
- Chris Bauer as Gary
- Chelsey Crisp as Ma Meaney

== Production ==
In September 2021, it was announced that 20th Century Studios acquired the rights to an untitled thriller written by Wayne creator Shawn Simmons, with Rhett Reese and Paul Wernick producing. In July 2023, it was announced that the film was titled Eenie Meanie, with Simmons as director and Samara Weaving attached to star. In March 2024, Karl Glusman joined the film. Kyanna Simon and Randall Park joined in April 2024. The next month, Andy Garcia, Jermaine Fowler, Marshawn Lynch, Chris Bauer, Steve Zahn, and Mike O'Malley joined the cast.

Filming began by April 24, 2024, in Cleveland, Ohio, under the working title Stickshift and with Tim Ives as cinematographer. Filming also took place in Lakewood and Toledo, with the Hollywood Casino being used as a location; shooting caused detours for the Toledo Area Regional Transit Authority 10L and 14 bus routes. It wrapped up on June 29.

== Release ==
Eenie Meanie was released by 20th Century Studios on Hulu on August 22, 2025. Internationally, the film was made available to stream on Disney+.

== Reception ==
=== Viewership ===
Eenie Meanie entered Hulu's "Top 15 Today" list—a daily updated list of the platform's most-watched titles—a day after its premiere, climbing to No. 8 on the weekly list of the most-watched titles in the United States. It was the second highest-performing movie on the platform, behind the survival thriller The Bayou (No. 3). JustWatch, a guide to streaming content with access to data from more than 20 million users around the world, reported that Eenie Meanie was the most-streamed film in the U.S. from August 18–24. The following week, from August 25–31, it ranked as the third most-streamed film. TVision, which tracks viewer attention, program reach, and engagement across more than 1,000 CTV apps, announced that it ranked as the tenth most-streamed film in the United States in August. It was subsequently the sixteenth most-streamed film in the country in September.

=== Critical response ===
On the review aggregator website Rotten Tomatoes, 43% of 51 critics' reviews are positive, with an average rating of 5.4/10. The website's consensus reads: "A tonal mishmash that never quite comes together, Eenie Meanie gets enough appeal from star Samara Weaving to avoid being a total 'miney d'oh,' but it doesn't have enough originality to catch a tiger by the toe." Metacritic, which uses a weighted average, assigned the film a score of 47 out of 100, based on 10 critics, indicating "mixed or average" reviews.

John Nugent of Empire gave Eenie Meanie 4 out of 5 stars, calling it a "a rollicking crime comedy with enough punchy jokes and punch-the-air action that it really should be have been seen with a packed popcorn-munching Friday-opening-night crowd". Ben Gibbons of Screen Rant rated the film 7/10, praising it as a "thrilling action dramedy that is captivating from start to finish" with "[i]ncredible writing and direction by Shawn Simmons" and an "enigmatic performance" by Samara Weaving. Bill Bria of /Film also rated it 7/10, finding it to be a "rare" film which tries to "blend vicarious thrills with sober morality", and "ends up as a satisfyingly well-rounded experience" with "Simmons' ambition, some incredible stunt work, and especially the lead performance by Samara Weaving".

Carla Meyer of San Francisco Chronicle considered Eenie Meanie an "surprisingly enjoyable" film that offers "mindless fun" with "magnetic lead performances by Samara Weaving and Karl Glusman" and "realistic chase scenes", despite it has "a late, sharp-left storytelling turn". William Bibbiani of TheWrap similarly praised the film for its "snappy dialogue, cool car chase, and great cast", but noted that it is "not a particularly memorable" crime film which "would have benefitted from more car chases". Benjamin Lee at The Guardian gave the film 2 out of 5 stars and described the film as "a bumpy road" for audiences, while approving Weaving as a "little indistinctive as a lead despite the flashy chaos", he found the ending "unsatisfying as [Simmons] doesn't quite know where to take us next".

Natalie Winkelman of The New York Times found Eenie Meanie to be a "bloody heist film that brims with cheap thrills and tawdry action", struggling to balance melodrama with its "exuberant self-awareness a la Quentin Tarantino". Brian Tallerico of RogerEbert.com gave the film 1 out of 4 stars, criticizing it for its "lack of identity and almost zero organic tension" and describing it as a "a bunch of loathsome idiots for 94 minutes without the craft or a Tarantino or the visual acumen of a Wright to make it worth the captivity". Brianna Zigler of The A.V. Club described the film as "mostly watchable and even engaging" in her C− review, but deeming it "offensively condescending to its female lead" for reinforcing "regressive" themes through how Edie "throw away her career out of pity for some dirtbag so she can mother his child".
