= Invasion Iowa =

2005 American TV series

- Genre: Comedy
- Created by: Rhett Reese; Paul Wernick
- Starring: Desi Lydic; William Shatner
- Country of origin: United States
- Original language: English
- No. of seasons: 1
- No. of episodes: 10

Production
- Production locations: Riverside, Iowa, United States
- Production company: GRB Entertainment

Original release
- Network: Spike TV
- Release: March 29 – April 1, 2005

Invasion Iowa is a television series that aired on Spike TV beginning on March 29, 2005, on ITV4 beginning on November 3, 2005, and The Comedy Channel in April 2007.

== Premise ==
The series depicts events from September 2004, in which William Shatner played a hoax on the small town of Riverside, Iowa, by claiming to film a science fiction movie there. Unbeknownst to the residents of Riverside, the movie was in fact fake, a satire on the genre. In front of and behind the cameras, Shatner and his purported entourage performed a parody of Hollywood and celebrity culture. Producers designed the various plots and gags to elicit reactions from the townspeople. Shatner played the part of the eccentric star and improvisational actors were hired as members of his entourage.

== Production ==
Producers chose Riverside because it is the self-proclaimed future birthplace of Shatner's most enduring character, Captain James T. Kirk. Residents of Riverside were encouraged to audition for parts in the movie and take jobs on its crew.

Invasion Iowa was created by Rhett Reese and Paul Wernick, who also created Spike TV's earlier "reality parody" series, The Joe Schmo Show, and its sequel, Joe Schmo 2.

== Release ==
In May 2009, the series was released as a two-disc region-1 DVD set.

== Cast ==
- William Shatner as himself
- Desi Lydic as Disintegratrix 3000
- Ernie Grunwald as Steve Cook
