= Josh Horowitz =

American entertainment journalist (born 1976)

- Horowitz at the 2016 San Diego Comic-Con
- Born: Joshua Horowitz; April 1, 1976 (age 50); New York
- Education: Hobart and William Smith Colleges
- Occupation: Entertainment journalist
- Spouse: Jennifer Powers (m. 2008)

Joshua Horowitz (born April 1, 1976) is an American entertainment journalist and podcaster. A 1998 graduate of Hobart and William Smith Colleges, he was a correspondent with MTV News beginning in 2006, being described as the public face of their film coverage. He hosted the digital series After Hours, produced the digital series Junketeers, and hosted the COVID-19 pandemic-based digital series Stir Crazy, all with Comedy Central, and signed an overall deal with Viacom in 2018 to develop content for their broadcast programming and digital content platforms. He hosted the digital series MTV Reunions, and hosted the digital talk show Peak Talks.

Horowitz has hosted the Happy Sad Confused podcast since 2014, executive produced by Scott Porch and Kristian Harloff for Big IP Media. Initially in audio only format, it switched to video format because of the COVID-19 pandemic which saw Horowitz make use of the Zoom videoconferencing software; Horowitz prepares and researches for the show himself, and Kast Media has marketed, distributed and monetized the series. He made a cameo appearance in the mid-credits scene of the film Zombieland: Double Tap (2019). Horowitz created the online series Who's a Good Guest, where celebrities interview with Horowitz with their pets, produced by the company Bark, and he is noted for having influenced the casting of Ryan Gosling in the Marvel Cinematic Universe starting with the film Ghost Rider (2028).

== Biography ==
=== Early and personal life ===
Joshua Horowitz was born on April 1, 1976, (Note: An October 2008 listing in The New York Times described him as 32 years old, and he has noted his birthday as April 1 in several Instagram posts.) and is from New York. He graduated from Hobart and William Smith Colleges in 1998, majoring in English. He is Jewish, has described this part of his identity as "questionable", and never had a bar mitzvah. He married Jennifer Powers, who worked at the Natural Resources Defense Council, in October 2008. He and his wife adopted a rescue dog named Lucy during the COVID-19 pandemic.

=== Career ===
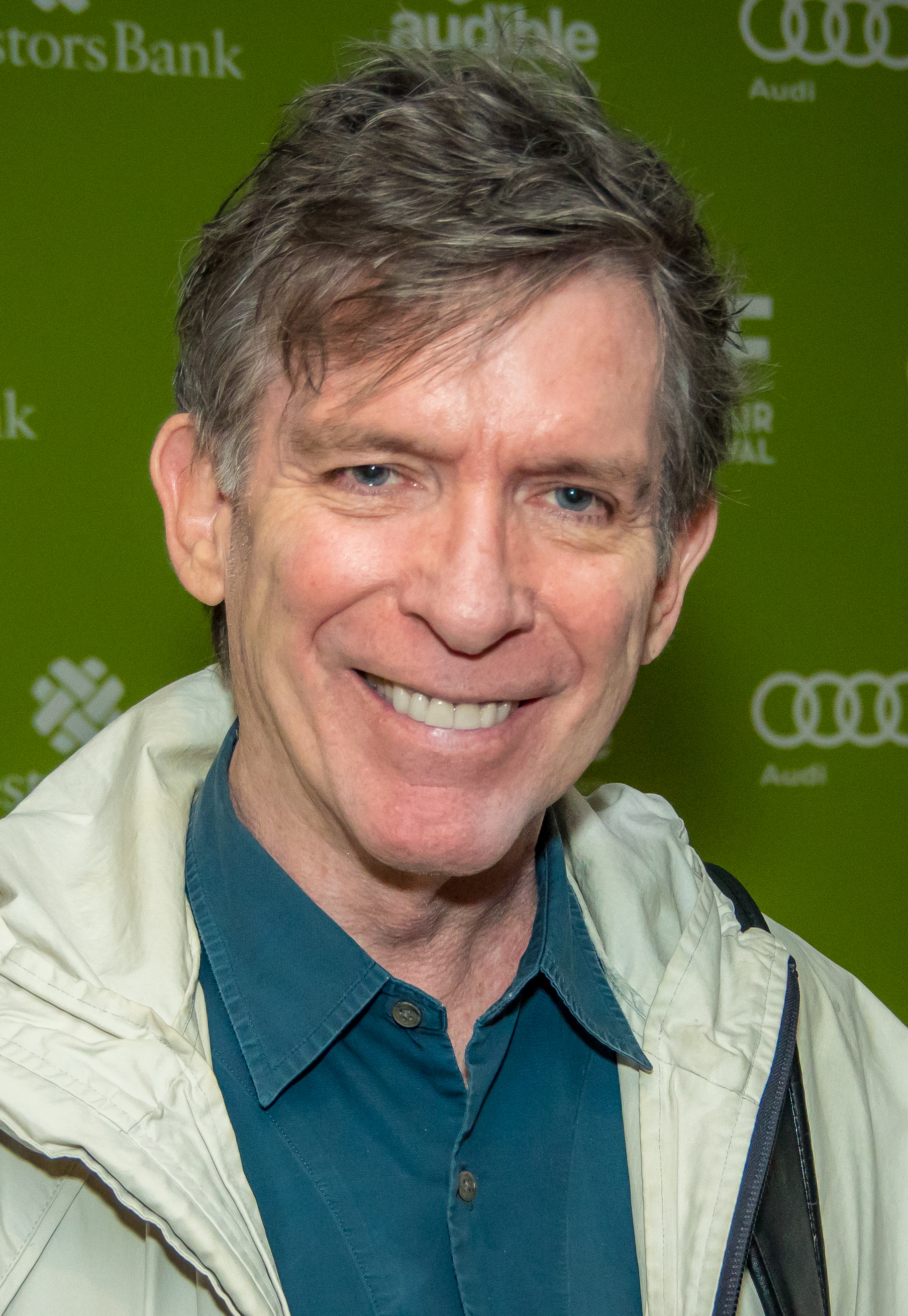
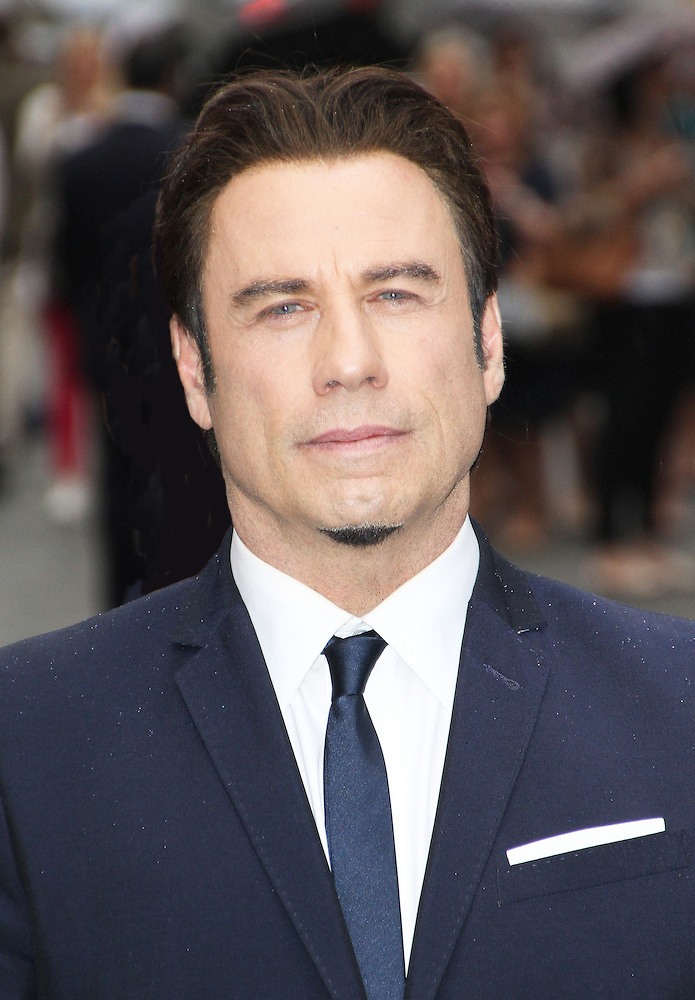
Horowitz hosted his first interview on MTV News when Kurt Loder (left) was unavailable to interview John Travolta (right)

Horowitz's career began as a producer and a booking agent for various series. Since 2006, he has been an on-air and online correspondent for MTV News, and has been described as the "face of MTV's movie coverage" by The Washington Post. Horowitz's first interview on MTV News was with John Travolta, due to anchor Kurt Loder being unavailable that day on account of illness. He hosted the sketch comedy series After Hours on MTV.com and later on Comedy Central's digital platforms starting in 2010, which was relaunched in 2018 with the signing of an overall deal with Viacom. This deal included development for broadcast programming and digital content platforms through Viacom Digital Studios, Viacom Velocity, MTV, Comedy Central, and Paramount Network. Horowitz was the host of the digital series MTV Reunions, in which casts of popular TV series reunite to raise money for charity, beginning in June 2020 with the cast of Teen Wolf (2011–2017). MTV News shut down in May 2023.

Since 2014, Horowitz has been the host of the Happy Sad Confused podcast. It is produced by Horowitz and executive produced by Scott Porch and Kristian Harloff for Big IP Media. Horowitz explained that the name is related to the "cheesy and a little sketchy, a little odd" photo shoots he previously did with interviewees at MTV, which he felt were awkard and instead decided to do poses of "happy, sad, and confused" expressions with interviewees. On Happy Sad Confused, he has interviewed actors IndieWire described as "notoriously private, or rather, anti-podcast", becoming "the go-to hub for all-things pop culture" according to the publication. Horowitz said in 2024 that he has several short-form content and long-form content editors, and he serves in the capacities as producer, prepper, and researcher himself. It was in audio format initially, but during the COVID-19 pandemic, he transitioned to using Zoom videoconferencing software to conduct interviews. In-person hosting is done at 92nd Street Y in New York City. The podcast began showing on YouTube in 2022, and in January 2023 it was reported that Horowitz signed a deal with Kast Media to market, distribute and monetize the series.

In 2016, Comedy Central launched the eight-episode Junketeers produced by Horowitz and Ben Lyons with Lexus's L-Studio and Kids at Play, which stars Brian Unger, Barak Hardley, Austin Lyon, Phil Augusta Jackson and Amanda Lundref in the roles of Hollywood reporters who struggle to get quotes from film stars. In a five minute episode format, the series featured cameo appearances by Josh Duhamel, Kristen Bell, Gillian Jacobs, Chloë Grace Moretz, Eli Roth, Emily Ratajkowski, Tom Felton and Matt Bomer. It premiered on Comedy Central's YouTube channel and other social media platforms. Horowitz made a cameo appearance in the mid-credits scene of the 2019 film Zombieland: Double Tap, in a fictional scenario where he interviews Bill Murray promoting Garfield 3. Admist the social distancing and home isolation practices of the COVID-19 pandemic, Horowitz began the digital interview series Stir Crazy in 2020 with Comedy Central, which sees guests play charades and I spy. The series's guests include Will Arnett, Dan Levy, Josh Hutcherson, Ed Helms, Ricky Gervais, and Ben Schwartz.

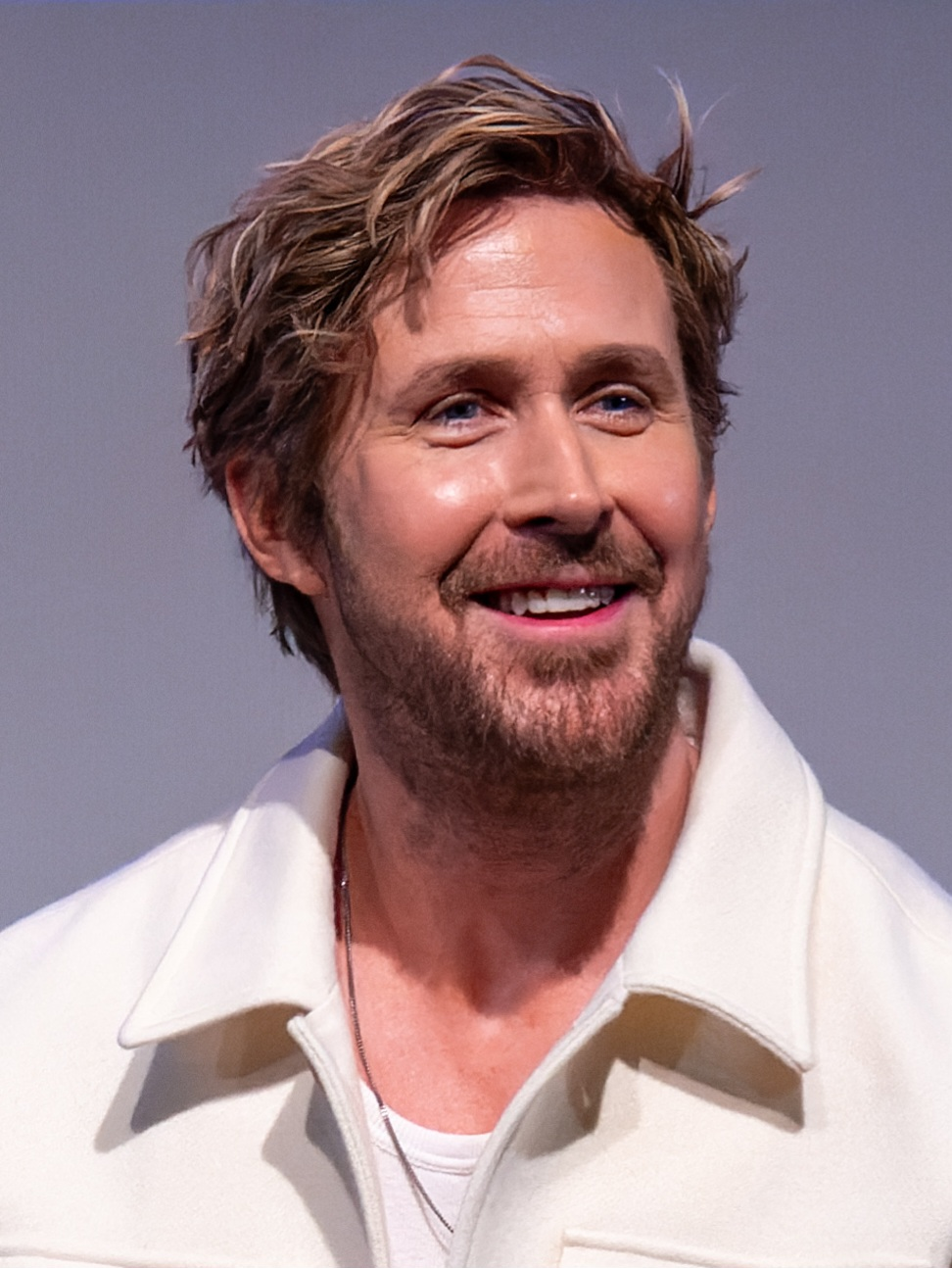
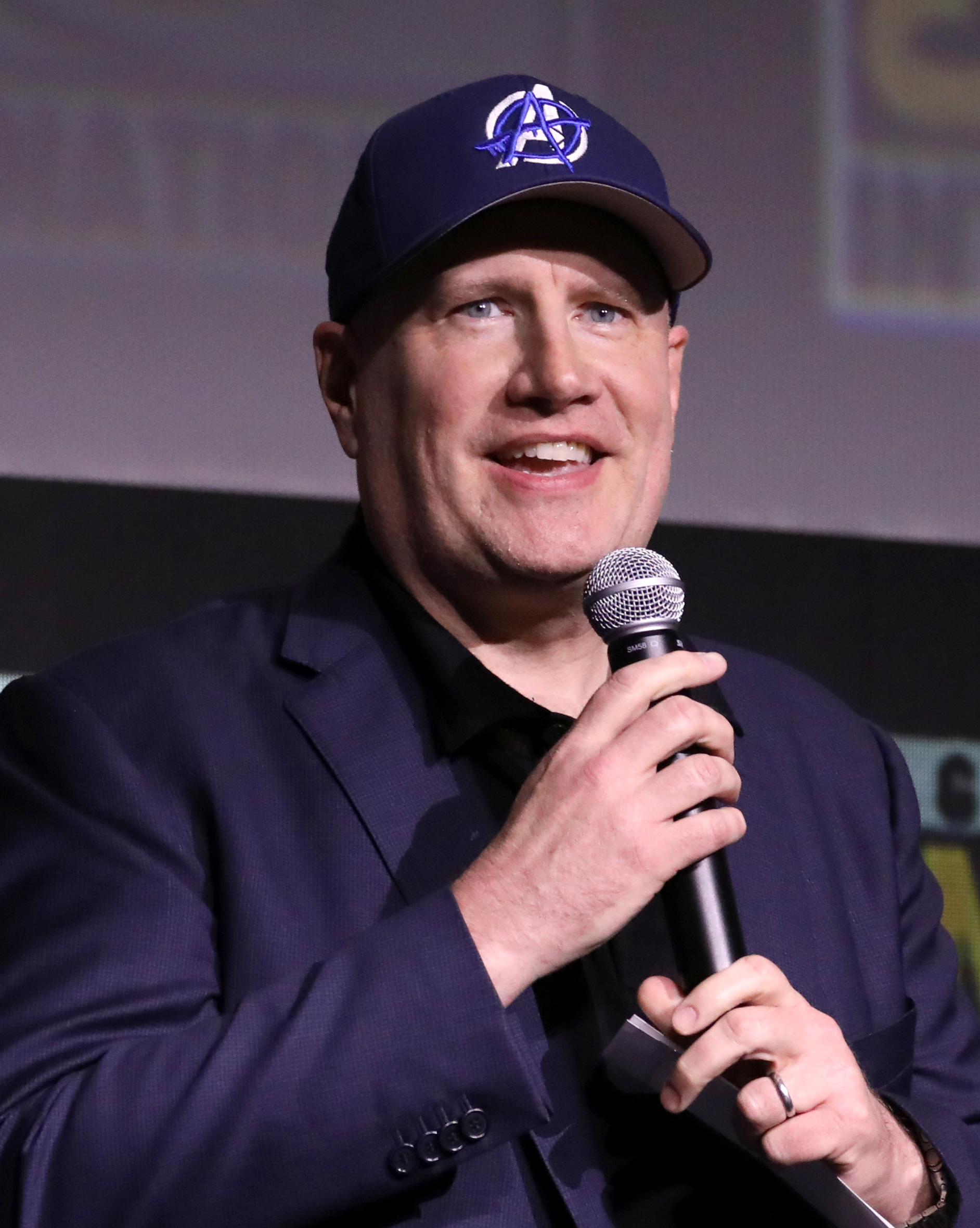
Horowitz influenced the casting of Ryan Gosling (left) in the Marvel Cinematic Universe, and helped announce it with Marvel Studios president Kevin Feige (right) at the San Diego Comic-Con

Beginning in October 2025 Horowitz hosted the digital talk show Peak Talks for Paramount+, featuring conversations with actors as they ride up a virtual ski lift, with guests including stars from the shows NCIS: Tony & Ziva (2025), Star Trek: Strange New Worlds (2022–present), Tulsa King (2022–present), and Landman (2024–present). Horowitz and Bark (a "dog lifestyle company", according to The Hollywood Reporter), created the 2026 online series Who's a Good Guest in which celebrities participate in an interview by Horowitz with their pets. The first season of Who's a Good Guest? premiered on February 4, 2026, featuring Dylan O'Brien and his dog Tony, and aired weekly featuring Zoey Deutch, Bob Odenkirk, Johnny Knoxville, Ginnifer Goodwin and Patrick Wilson. The second season premiered on July 22, and among the guests were Jake Johnson, Chase Stokes, and Alexandra Daddario. Horowitz was involved in the casting of Ryan Gosling as Ghost Rider in the Marvel Cinematic Universe starting with Ghost Rider (2028), first discussing the idea in a July 2022 interview with Gosling. Horowitz later discussed talks between Gosling and Marvel Studios in a March 2026 interview with the actor, and eventually helped Marvel Studios president Kevin Feige announce the film with Gosling at the San Diego Comic-Con in July.
