= Ghosted (2023 film) =

American film directed by Dexter Fletcher

- Promotional release poster
- Directed by: Dexter Fletcher
- Screenplay by: Rhett Reese; Paul Wernick; Chris McKenna; Erik Sommers
- Story by: Rhett Reese; Paul Wernick
- Produced by: David Ellison; Dana Goldberg; Don Granger; Chris Evans; Jules Daly; Paul Wernick; Rhett Reese
- Starring: Chris Evans; Ana de Armas; Adrien Brody; Mike Moh; Amy Sedaris; Tate Donovan; Tim Blake Nelson; Marwan Kenzari; Anna Deavere Smith
- Cinematography: Salvatore Totino
- Edited by: Josh Schaeffer; Chris Lebenzon; Jim May
- Music by: Lorne Balfe
- Production company: Skydance
- Distributed by: Apple TV+ (under Apple Original Films)
- Release date: April 21, 2023
- Running time: 116 minutes
- Country: United States
- Language: English

Ghosted is a 2023 American romantic action comedy film directed by Dexter Fletcher and written by the writing teams of Rhett Reese and Paul Wernick, and Chris McKenna and Erik Sommers, from a story by Reese and Wernick. The film stars Chris Evans, Ana de Armas, Adrien Brody, Mike Moh, Amy Sedaris, Tim Blake Nelson, Marwan Kenzari, and Anna Deavere Smith.

Organic farmer Cole falls head over heels for Sadie after spending one day together. Before they can have a second date, he inadvertently discovers she is a secret agent and suddenly they are caught up in an international adventure.

Produced by Skydance, it was released by Apple TV+ on April 21, 2023. Despite receiving generally negative reviews from critics, it became Apple TV+'s most watched film debut.

== Plot ==
At a Washington, D.C. farmers' market, Sadie Rhodes, a lonely professional who travels often, meets Cole Turner, a romantic agricultural author. They share an enjoyable all-night date, culminating in sex, and he returns home but his texts to her go unanswered. Cole's sister suspects she is "ghosting" him, but their parents convince Cole to surprise Sadie in London, after locating her via a tracker on his inhaler he accidentally left in her bag.

In London, Cole is abducted to Pakistan by arms dealers who believe he is legendary CIA operative "the Taxman". Before he can be tortured with insects to extract a passcode, he is rescued by Sadie, who reveals herself to be the Taxman. After a chase through the Khyber Pass, they escape Cole's captors. These are working for Leveque, a disgraced French Intelligence agent selling a stolen bioweapon called "Aztec", which he needs the passcode to access.

Reaching a nearby town, Cole and Sadie argue over their lies to each other, and meet Marco, her old contact and former lover. He warns Cole that Sadie puts the success of a mission before her boyfriends' lives, showing him his missing hand, and agrees to take him home. Their plan is interrupted by a succession of bounty hunters after Leveque puts a price on Cole's head; Marco is killed, but the bounty hunters all kill each other. Learning that Leveque is seeking the passcode, Sadie decides to recover Aztec using Cole as bait.

Sadie delivers Cole to Leveque, who leaves his henchman Wagner on a plane with Sadie, Cole, and the locked case containing Aztec. Sadie and Cole's cover is blown when Wagner discovers a picture of the two in bed together on Cole's phone, but Cole parachutes to safety with the Aztec case and a wounded Sadie. Landing on Socotra Island, he uses his agricultural knowledge to treat her, and she is impressed both by his recovery of the Aztec case and his resourcefulness. They are ambushed by Leveque's men, and Wagner escapes with the case while Cole and Sadie are rescued by U.S. Marines.

At CIA headquarters, Sadie and Cole take a lie-detector test where he satisfies the agents that he is a civilian but is hurt by the revelation that she believes that she should have sacrificed him for the mission. Sadie is suspended for losing Aztec and the agency briefly tries to turn Cole against her; however, he deduces the passcode after seeing an unusual crop in the photos from Sadie's mission reports. With this new leverage, the agency convinces Cole to resume masquerading as the Taxman, luring Leveque with an offer to sell the code.

Leveque meets Cole at a revolving restaurant with interested buyer for Aztec, Mr. Utami, and has the agents monitoring Cole killed. Sadie arrives, restoring Cole's trust in her, and she sells the passcode to Mr. Utami for $10 million. She immediately uses the money to place a bounty on Leveque, and they are suddenly surrounded by bounty hunters.

A gunfight erupts. Cole and Sadie fight their way through the bounty hunters and Utami's bodyguards by working together. While inexperienced, Cole proves to have excellent instincts during the fight, supporting Sadie by throwing opponents to the ground and using a shotgun to provide cover.

However, Wagner pulls Cole into the mechanical room where their one-on-one fight damages the restaurant's revolving mechanism. Leveque shoots Utami, and Cole kills Wagner by throwing him into the mechanism. Returning, Cole assists Sadie pursuing Leveque against the walls of the restaurant as its speed increases. She manages to send Leveque crashing through a window to his death and narrowly saves the Aztec device while using Cole as an anchor.

Rekindling their relationship, Sadie meets Cole's family. The two reveal they are now traveling together while Cole conducts his research and Sadie "hunts down" her clients, allowing them to make time for each other.

== Cast ==
- Chris Evans as Cole Turner
- Ana de Armas as Sadie Rhodes
- Adrien Brody as Leveque
- Mike Moh as Wagner
- Tate Donovan as Cole's dad
- Amy Sedaris as Cole's mom
- Lizze Broadway as Mattie Turner, Cole's sister
- Mustafa Shakir as Monte Jackson
- Anthony Mackie as the Grandson of Sam
- John Cho as the Leopard
- Sebastian Stan as God, a bounty hunter
- Ryan Reynolds as Jonas
- Anna Deavere Smith as Claudia Yates
- Tim Blake Nelson as Borislov
- Tiya Sircar as Patti
- Stephen Park as Utami
- Fahim Fazli as Mosque Hammam
- Burn Gorman as the English cabbie
- Marwan Kenzari as Marco
- Dexter Fletcher as Raoul

== Production ==
In August 2021, Chris Evans and Scarlett Johansson entered negotiations to star in Ghosted, a film pitched by screenwriters Paul Wernick and Rhett Reese to Skydance Media, with Dexter Fletcher attached to direct. In December 2021, Johansson had to exit the film due to a scheduling conflict, leading to Ana de Armas being cast in her place. In February 2022, Adrien Brody joined the cast. Mike Moh, Amy Sedaris, Tim Blake Nelson and Tate Donovan would be added in March.

Principal photography took place from February to May 2022 at Tallulah Falls Lake in Tallulah Gorge State Park, Georgia; North Park Square, Marietta, Georgia; Chesapeake and Ohio Canal between Thomas Jefferson and 31st Street in Georgetown, the Lincoln Book Tower, Ford's Theatre and the Kennedy Center for the Performing Arts, all in Washington D.C. Scenes in the Khyber Pass mountains were filmed in New Mexico, while the city of Mingora, Pakistan, was filmed on a set in Atlanta.

== Release ==
The film was released on Apple TV+ on April 21, 2023. According to a Samba TV research panel of 3.1 million smart television households who tuned in for at least one minute, Ghosted drew in 328,500 viewers in the first two days, and is the most watched film debut in Apple TV+ history.

== Reception ==
On the review aggregator website Rotten Tomatoes, 25% of 118 critics' reviews are positive, with an average rating of 4.2/10. The website's consensus reads: "Listlessly wafting between action, comedy, and romance without ever solidifying into a satisfying whole, Ghosted earns a chorus of boos." Metacritic, which uses a weighted average, assigned the film a score of 34 out of 100, based on 29 critics, indicating "generally unfavorable" reviews.

Benjamin Lee, writing for The Guardian, gave the film one out of five stars, criticizing the lack of chemistry between Evans and de Armas and calling the film "a staggeringly, maddeningly atrocious heap of increasingly boneheaded decisions that will act as depressing documentation of just how rotten things got in the current oversaturated streaming landscape." Writing for RogerEbert.com, Peter Sobczynski also criticized Evans and de Armas's lack of chemistry as well as Fletcher's direction, negatively comparing the film to True Lies (1994), Mr. & Mrs. Smith (2005) and Knight and Day (2010), and calling the film "a tedious exercise in sheer greed and laziness that presumes if enough money and famous faces are tossed into the mix, no one will notice, or at least mind, the utter vacuousness of the enterprise"; he gave the film 0.5 out of four stars. David Ehrlich of IndieWire gave the film a "C–" grade, criticizing the film's lack of commitment to its concepts and ideas, writing that the film "has no interest in anything more than a casual relationship with its audience, as it reliably stifles a joke or kills the mood the moment it suspects that you might be about to catch feelings."

Conversely, Stephanie Zacharek at Time noted Evans and de Armas's chemistry more positively, while also noting the film's familiarity, writing: "Ghosted clacks along efficiently, ticking off all the expected boxes. There are no surprises here, just the pleasant ectoplasmic shimmer of a formula you've seen a million times before, vanishing almost as soon as the end credits start rolling."

In an article for BBC Online, Nicholas Barber muses that "viewers have different requirements when they're clicking away at home on a Tuesday night. Ghosted and its fellow direct-to-streaming movies provide precision-engineered undemanding escapism that the whole family can agree to sit through."

=== Accolades ===
Award / Film Festival	Date of ceremony	Category	Recipient(s)	Result	Ref.
Golden Raspberry Awards	March 9, 2024	Worst Actor	Chris Evans	Nominated	
Golden Raspberry Awards	March 9, 2024	Worst Actress	Ana de Armas	Nominated	
Golden Raspberry Awards	March 9, 2024	Worst Screen Couple	Ana de Armas & Chris Evans (who flunked Screen Chemistry)	Nominated	
