= Balls Up =

2026 American film by Peter Farrelly

- Release poster
- Directed by: Peter Farrelly
- Written by: Rhett Reese; Paul Wernick
- Produced by: David Ellison; Dana Goldberg; Don Granger; Andrew Muscato; Rhett Reese; Paul Wernick
- Starring: Mark Wahlberg; Paul Walter Hauser; Benjamin Bratt; Eva De Dominici; Daniela Melchior; Molly Shannon; Sacha Baron Cohen
- Cinematography: John Brawley
- Edited by: Sam Seig
- Music by: Dave Palmer
- Production companies: Skydance Media; Reese/Wernick Productions
- Distributed by: Amazon MGM Studios (via Prime Video) (Note: Released through the Metro-Goldwyn-Mayer banner.)
- Release date: April 15, 2026
- Running time: 104 minutes
- Country: United States
- Language: English

Balls Up is a 2026 American action comedy film directed by Peter Farrelly and written by Rhett Reese and Paul Wernick. The film stars Mark Wahlberg, Paul Walter Hauser, Benjamin Bratt, Eva De Dominici, Daniela Melchior, Molly Shannon, and Sacha Baron Cohen.

Balls Up was released by Amazon Prime Video on April 15, 2026. The film received negative reviews from critics.

== Plot ==
Product inventor Elijah DeBell reveals to company executives his newly developed condom, the 'The Testicle Sentinel', which goes over the balls. Salesman Brad Lewison and Elijah, who do not respect one another, are tasked with pitching this new product to Brazil's Travel Ministry to become the official condom of the World Cup. They wow executive Senhor Santos, who loses control while celebrating and makes all three lose their position. 'The Testicle Sentinel', renamed 'Balls Up', is passed over for a rival product.

Brad and Elijah pass months unemployed, blaming each other for what happened, and suddenly receive free tickets to Brazil to attend the World Cup finale as Santos had promised. Reluctantly reuniting, they both take the trip. Near the end of the match, Elijah becomes upset at seeing the rival condom sponsor's mascot, convinced that it's taunting him, and runs into the field to punch it as Brad chases after him. Accidentally, he blocks Brazil's goal, preventing the country from tying the match with Argentina.

Elijah and Brad are detained in a country that takes the game extremely seriously. Antonia Costa comes in as their public attorney, but the pair reject her so she can live without the burden of defending the country's enemies. Then, they are invited to speak to Brazilian Defence Minister Cristos, who lets them return to the USA, unprotected from public rage. They're chased through the streets by a mob and rescued briefly by Santos before being re-captured by a Brazilian cartel.

They awake in a lavish drug cartel compound led by the eccentric Pavio Curto Bundchen, who thanks them for helping him win his bet on the match and promises protection. While celebrating, the duo pitches the Balls Up to Curto, who sees the potential of a larger condom to increase the amount their drug mules could transport. A rival cartel attacks the compound. Curto is killed, and Brad and Elijah escape into the jungle in a truck full of drugs they make crash.

When Brad and Elijah run out of the cocaine rush, they encounter a large black caiman, which swallows the test condoms filled with drugs and dies, so they cook and eat some of the flesh to regain strength. Moving on, they encounter a group of environmentalists camping in the jungle that murders Black caiman poachers. They praise the duo as anti-government activists until camera footage shows Brad and Elijah eating the caiman. They escape again by stealing a boat onto the Amazon River.

The next morning, their boat is intercepted by a military gunboat commanded by Cristos, who offers them to serve time in jail so they can leave the country legally. They refuse, and Cristos leaves them by the waterfall at the Iguazu Falls. After surviving the fall, the men come face-to-face with an armed military force and Antonia, actually named Isadora and a spy for the Argentinian government. The group had been trying to rescue the duo ever since they were detained, and they finally welcome them as heroes in Argentina. Brad and Elijah overcome their differences, become friends, and are able to pitch 'Balls Up' once again, this time succeeding.

== Cast ==
- Mark Wahlberg as Brad Lewison
- Paul Walter Hauser as Elijah DeBell
- Sacha Baron Cohen as Pavio Curto Bundchen
- Benjamin Bratt as Senhor Santos
- Luciano Szafir as Cristos
- Eva De Dominici as Emilia
- Daniela Melchior as Antonia / Isadora Costa
- Molly Shannon as Burgess
- Eric André as Eco Warrior Aaron
- Chelsey Crisp as Eco Warrior Julie

== Production ==
In June 2024, it was announced that Mark Wahlberg and Paul Walter Hauser were cast in the film, with Peter Farrelly directing from a script by Rhett Reese and Paul Wernick. In July 2024, Molly Shannon, Eva De Dominici, and Benjamin Bratt joined the film. In August, Daniela Melchior and Eric André joined the cast. In September, Chelsey Crisp joined the cast.

=== Filming ===
Principal photography began in mid-July 2024 at Village Roadshow Studios in Queensland. Some filming took place in places around Brisbane, Queensland, particularly in front of the Town Hall.

== Release ==
The film was released worldwide on Prime Video on April 15, 2026.

== Reception ==
On the review aggregator website Rotten Tomatoes, 23% of 44 critics' reviews are positive, with an average rating of 3.8/10. The website's consensus reads: "Balls Up, thumbs down." Metacritic, which uses a weighted average, assigned the film a score of 34 out of 100, based on 8 critics, indicating "generally unfavorable" reviews.

M.N. Miller of FandomWire wrote that Balls Up "suggests comedy has passed Peter Farrelly by."
