= The 60 Yard Line =

- Film poster
- Directed by: Leif Gantvoort
- Written by: Ryan Churchill; Nick Greco
- Produced by: Leif Gantvoort; Nick Greco; Ryan Churchill; Alex McCullough
- Starring: Ryan Churchill; Kimberley Crossman; Nic Greco; Jacquelyn Zook; Chelsey Crisp; Leif Gantvoort; Mindy Sterling; John D'Aquino; Randall Park
- Cinematography: Cameron Schmucker
- Music by: Jimmy Deer
- Release date: April 2, 2017 (United States)
- Running time: 90 minutes
- Language: English

The 60 Yard Line is a 2017 American comedy film directed by Leif Gantvoort and produced by Ryan Churchill.

== Premise ==
The film is based on the true story of two best friends who purchase a house adjacent to Lambeau Field, the home of the Green Bay Packers. The film centers on the choices the friends must make between their love of football and their personal lives.

== Cast ==
- Ryan Churchill as Ben 'Zagger' Zagowski, a huge Green Bay Packers fan and shipping clerk who is engaged to Amy
- Kimberley Crossman as Amy Etzman, Zagger's longtime fiance and co-worker
- Nic Greco as Nick 'Polano' Polano, Zagger's best friend, coworker, and a Chicago Bears fan
- Jacquelyn Zook as Debbie Zagowski, Zagger's sister and friend of Amy
- Chelsey Crisp as Jody Johnson, a Packers fan who becomes friends with Zagger
- Leif Gantvoort as Greg Hayes, a shipping executive who is Amy and Zagger's boss
- Mindy Sterling as Linda Zagowski, Zagger's mom and part owner of the family business
- John D'Aquino as John Zagowski, Zagger's dad and part owner of the family business
- Randall Park as Trapper, a longtime Packers fan who secretly lives in Zagger's garage

The film also features multiple cameo appearances by former Packers players, including former Packers players Ahman Green, John Kuhn, and Mark Tauscher. Tom Zalaski and Burke Griffin, Green Bay TV personalities, former Green Bay mayor Jim Schmitt, and mixed martial artist Chuck Liddell also make appearances.

== Production ==
The 60 Yard Line was primarily filmed on-location in Green Bay, although a few scenes were filmed in various locations in Los Angeles. Filming occurred in the fall of 2015, with additional scenes that required snow being filmed in the winter of 2016. The film was completed on a "limited budget".

== Release ==
The film released in 2017 at select theaters across the United States, with special screenings occurring in the fall of 2017. It formally premiered at the Wisconsin Film Festival on April 2, 2017. It was also played at the 2018 Beloit International Film Festival and won multiple awards at the Los Angeles Film Festival and the Wisconsin Film Festival.

The movie was released on DVD, Blu-ray, and iTunes on November 7, 2017.

== See also ==
- Film industry in Wisconsin
