= Netherworld Haunted House =

Haunted attraction outside Atlanta, Georgia

Netherworld
- Interactive map of Netherworld
- Location: 1313 Netherworld Way; Stone Mountain, Georgia
- Coordinates: 33.818690°N 84.119050°W
- Opened: 1997
- Owner: Ben Armstrong; Billy Messina
- Theme: Halloween
- Operating season: Fall
- Website: Official website

Netherworld Haunted House is a self-guided, walk-through haunted attraction located near Atlanta, Georgia, in unincorporated Gwinnett County. It is a seasonal Halloween-based event which opened in 1997.

Netherworld is distinguished by having developed an original theme which was not based on popular movies, such as slasher films, but rather on a unique storyline. It operates during October of each year.

== History ==
The Collector is an icon character at Netherworld Haunted House in Norcross, GA.

Beginning in 1997, there was only a single haunted house located in Kennesaw, GA. In 1998, Netherworld moved to the Georgia Antique Center in Norcross, GA and a second smaller haunt was added in 1999, featuring a 3-D ChromaDepth experience. In 2000, a third event was added at a remote location for one year, called Bloodfeast, a replica of a Medieval Torture Chamber. This event can now be seen every Spring at the Georgia Renaissance Festival. In 2003 Netherworld expanded with a third attraction that was located one floor below the larger one. It began as Tomb of Darkness, a very dark show, and slowly evolved into a more gory reality based event when compared with the traditional gothic horror elements of the upstairs haunt. In 2007 The 3-D Show and the Main show were combined in Leviathan, and a new introductory section and gift shop were added.

As of 2016, Netherworld Haunted Attractions LLC announced that they would be moving the entire attraction to Stone Mountain, Georgia. This move was announced in 2016, and as of 2017, the new location was open featuring three indoor "escape games" (escape rooms). In 2017, the main haunted houses remained at the Norcross location. After the 2017 season ended, Netherworld packed up over 20 years of props and monsters and moved to its new location at 2076 West Park Place Boulevard in Stone Mountain, GA.

Netherworld later had yet another address change, but in this instance, no physical move was necessary. In 2020, Gwinnett County, GA, granted Netherworld the new street name/number of 1313 Netherworld Way, replacing their former 2076 West Park Place address.

== Attractions ==
The current haunted attractions, as of 2026, are "CURSE OF THE COLLECTOR" and "BEYOND OBLIVION: LEGACY OF EVIL", which are both indoor haunted houses, with a portion of the second haunt outdoors. In addition, the company is running Escape the Netherworld, five escape room games, at their location in Stone Mountain. The themes of the escape rooms are Sasquatch, Nosferatu, Terror on Tiki Island, Alien Terror and The Haunted. In 2019, Netherworld also opened the seasonal Laser Tag Battle Area, a fun outside laser tag game that was open during the haunted house season only, and in 2026 the Laser Tag Battle Area was permanently closed to allow more space for the second haunted house.

Netherworld has always created original monsters and props, rather than using movie or television intellectual properties, as many other haunted attractions customarily do. Netherworld is known for its elaborate sets, innovative special effects, lighting and sound. Some of the actors perform stunts such as bungee jumps and sliding toward guests. A number of actors also stalk the queue line and Midway before the haunted house actually begins, starting the experience the moment guests get out of their cars. This is a somewhat different take on "scare zones", which are utilized by the larger theme parks.

== Media and awards ==
The 2009 film Zombieland had portions filmed inside of Netherworld, and members of the Netherworld crew participated in the films production. Rob Zombie's Halloween II film also rented props from the event and used Haunted House staff. Many Netherworld crew are now involved with production of the AMC TV series, The Walking Dead. Several key staff are members of the Special Effects Makeup and Costuming unions.

Netherworld won the #1 haunted house in America for 2017, according to Hauntworld.com, in their selection of the top 13 scariest haunted houses.
