= Rhett Reese =

American screenwriter

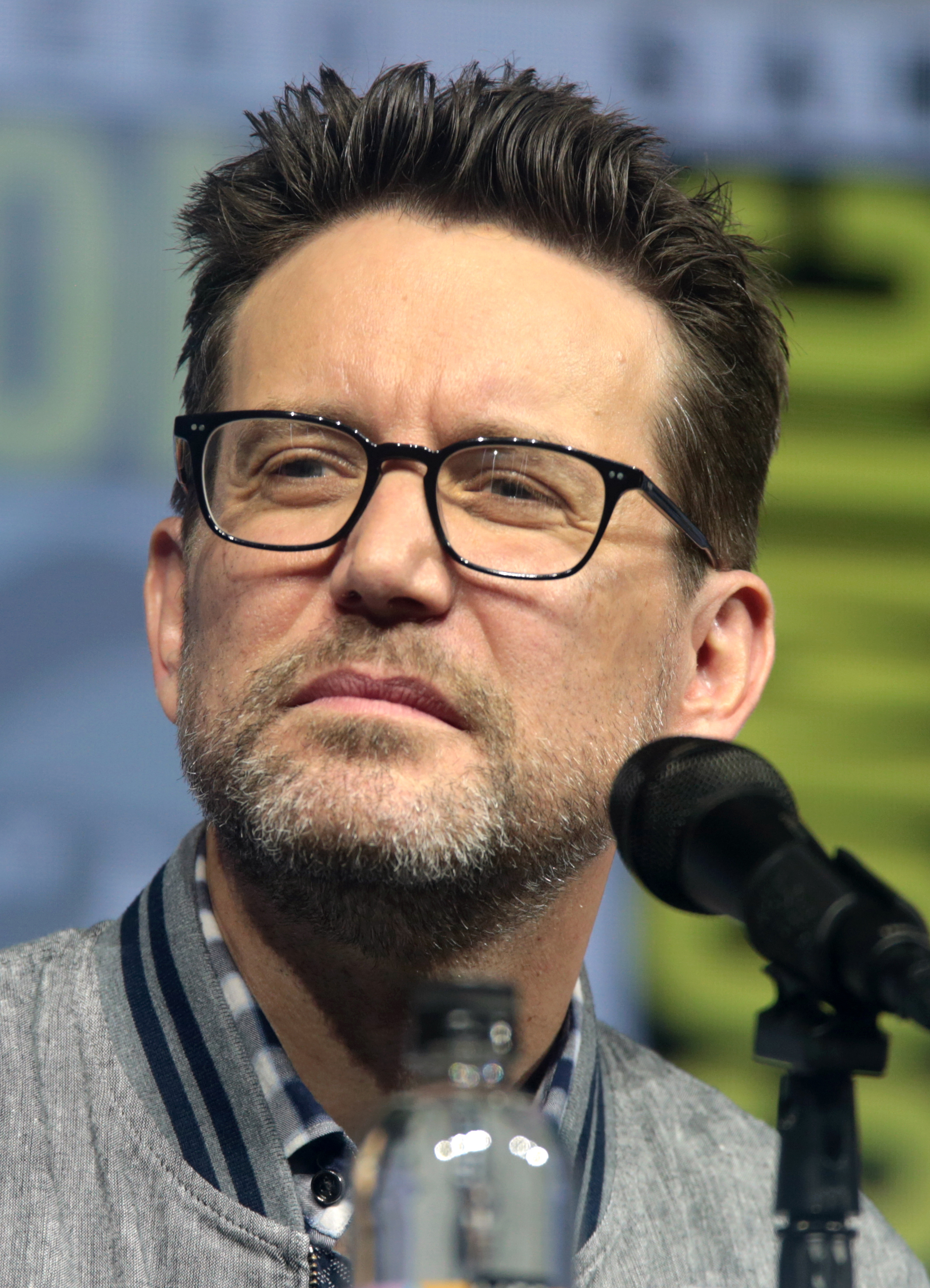
- Reese at the 2018 San Diego Comic-Con
- Occupations: Screenwriter, producer
- Years active: 1992–present
- Spouse: Chelsey Crisp (m. 2016)
- Children: 2

Rhett Reese is an American screenwriter. His early credits included Clifford's Really Big Movie and Cruel Intentions 3. He has collaborated with Paul Wernick, writing the films Zombieland, G.I. Joe: Retaliation, and Life, as well as Deadpool, Deadpool 2 and Deadpool & Wolverine. Together they also created the reality series The Joe Schmo Show.

== Early life ==
Rhett Reese grew up in Phoenix, Arizona, where he met Paul Wernick when the two attended Phoenix Country Day School. Rheese attended Stanford University.

== Career ==
As a budding screenwriter, Reese met Wernick again as he worked as a television producer, and one of Wernick's jobs, Big Brother 2, inspired both to do their own take on reality shows, The Joe Schmo Show. Broadcast on Spike TV, the series drew the highest ratings for the channel. The Joe Schmo Show was also named on numerous Best Of lists, including Time magazine's "Top 10 TV Shows of 2003" and Entertainment Weekly's "50 Best TV Shows Ever on DVD."

In 2004, Reese and Wernick created and executive-produced Stuck on ODB, a comedy reality show starring Ol' Dirty Bastard (ODB) of the Wu Tang Clan for Spike TV. However, ODB died before the show ever aired. A year later, Wernick and Reese followed up with Invasion Iowa, a high-concept, high-stakes comedy hybrid starring William Shatner. The show premiered on Spike on March 29, 2005.

Reese and Wernick's first feature collaboration was the 2009 film Zombieland, which they created and also executive-produced. The film was released by Sony Pictures on October 2, 2009, and became the highest-grossing zombie film at the time.

Reese and Wernick followed Zombieland with Paramount Pictures' G.I. Joe: Retaliation (2013), starring Dwayne Johnson, Channing Tatum, and Bruce Willis. The sequel outperformed the original, grossing $375 million.

In February 2012, it was announced Universal Studios had acquired Reese and Wernick's script for a feature film adaptation of Cowboy Ninja Viking. In September 2012, their original science fiction spec screenplay Epsilon was sold to Sony Pictures, with plans to co-produce with Michael De Luca. In April 2015, Reese and Wernick had optioned Thomas Oliver's book The Real Coke, The Real Story to produce a film about the failed launch of New Coke.

== Personal life ==
In November 5, 2016, Reese married actress, writer and producer Chelsey Crisp. By 2017, they were living in Los Angeles. In a January 2020 interview, Reese said that they had recently purchased a condominium in Paradise Valley, Arizona. Crisp gave birth to their first child in January 2022, and later gave birth to their second child.

== Filmography ==
Film

Year	Title	Writer	Executive Producer	Director
2000	Dinosaur	Story (Note: Additional story materials)	No	Ralph Zondag; Eric Leighton
2001	Monsters, Inc.	Story	No	Pete Docter
2004	Clifford's Really Big Movie	Yes	No	Robert Ramirez
2004	Cruel Intentions 3	Yes	No	Scott Ziehl
2005	Tarzan II	Story	No	Brian Smith
2009	Zombieland	Yes	Yes	Ruben Fleischer
2013	G.I. Joe: Retaliation	Yes	No	Jon M. Chu
2016	Deadpool	Yes	Yes	Tim Miller
2017	Life	Yes	No	Daniel Espinosa
2018	Deadpool 2	Yes	Yes	David Leitch
2019	6 Underground	Yes	Yes	Michael Bay
2019	Zombieland: Double Tap	Yes	Yes	Ruben Fleischer
2022	Spiderhead	Yes	No	Joseph Kosinski
2023	Ghosted	Yes	No	Dexter Fletcher
2024	Deadpool & Wolverine	Yes	Yes	Shawn Levy
2025	Eenie Meanie	No	Producer	Shawn Simmons
2025	Now You See Me: Now You Don't	Yes	No	Ruben Fleischer
2026	Balls Up	Yes	No	Peter Farrelly

Television

Year	Title	Writer	Producer	Creator
2005	Invasion Iowa	Yes	No	Yes
2003–2004, 2013	The Joe Schmo Show	Yes	Yes	Yes
2019	Wayne	Yes	Executive	No
2023–present	Twisted Metal	Yes	Yes	Yes
2023	The Continental: From the World of John Wick	No	Executive	No
