= Gavin Polone =

American film and television producer

- Other name: Gavin Pariah
- Education: University of California, Berkeley
- Occupations: Film producer; television producer
- Years active: 1998-present
- Notable work: Curb Your Enthusiasm

Gavin Polone is an American film and television producer and first-time director. He began producing films in the late 1990s and television in the 2000s. He has been nominated for seven Primetime Emmy Awards, of which six were for "Outstanding Comedy Series" for Larry David's Curb Your Enthusiasm. His production company is Pariah.

== Education ==
Polone graduated from University of California, Berkeley in three years.

== Career ==
Polone earned a realtor's license and applied to work for the Central Intelligence Agency but was not accepted. In 1985, he began work as an assistant at International Creative Management. He eventually became a literary agent at ICM. In 1989, ICM suspected that Polone planned to defect and fired him, though Polone says ICM was wrong about its suspicions.

He joined Bauer-Benedek Agency, and the agency eventually merged with Leading Artists Agency to form United Talent Agency. Polone eventually became a partner at UTA. He was disappointed in how the agency was run and threatened to leave. In April 1996, UTA fired Polone. Polone hired Peter Ostroff to sue UTA in a breach of contract lawsuit, and before the lawsuit was filed, UTA gave Polone a $6 million severance package and made a public admission that "'there were insufficient grounds' to fire him." UTA sued Polone a year later for reneging on the severance contract, and another settlement took place.

After departing from UTA, Polone launched his own management and production company and managed clients in both film and television. He eventually decided to become a film and television producer, and he dropped all of his clients except for Conan O'Brien. In 2007 and beyond, Polone became a pundit who appeared in media to comment on the 2007–2008 Writers Guild of America strike, Tiger Woods's infidelity scandal and fallout, and Michael Moore's association with Occupy Wall Street. He also writes an online column for New York Magazine.

In the late 1990s, he was partner with Judy Hofflund to start Hofflund/Polone, with both credited as executive producers on Gilmore Girls through its original run. Hofflund retired in 2013. In May 2001, he started Pariah, with an affiliated production company at Columbia TriStar Television. On February 19, 2002, Pariah decided to expand into film production with Screen Gems, Columbia Pictures and Senator International for a production-and-distribution deal. Shortly afterwards, on May 27, 2002, he moved his Pariah Television production division to NBC, creating projects that were designed solely for the network. On July 26, 2004, NBC decided to cut their ties with Pariah Television, and on April 14, 2005, the production company was moved back to Sony Pictures Entertainment for film and television projects.

Polone, formerly a member of Writers Guild of America West, left and maintained financial core status in 2015.

== Filmography ==
=== Film ===
Producer

- 8mm (1999)
- Drop Dead Gorgeous (1999)
- Stir of Echoes (1999)
- Panic Room (2002)
- Secret Window (2004)
- Seeing Other People (2004)
- Little Manhattan (2005)
- My Super Ex-Girlfriend (2006)
- Primeval (2007)
- Ghost Town (2008)
- Zombieland (2009)
- Premium Rush (2012)
- Nerdland (2016)
- A Dog's Purpose (2017)
- A Dog's Way Home (2019)
- A Dog's Journey (2019)
- Zombieland: Double Tap (2019)
- Psycho Killer (2026) (Also director)
- Cold Storage (2026)

Executive producer

- Population 436 (2006) (uncredited)

Acting roles

| Year | Title | Role |
|---|---|---|
| 1997 | An Alan Smithee Film: Burn Hollywood Burn | Gary Samuels |
| 1998 | Thick as Thieves | Simons |
| 2006 | Population 436 | Aames (uncredited) |

Special thanks

- Urge (2016)

=== Television series ===
Executive producer

| Year | Title | Notes |
|---|---|---|
| 1999 | Larry David: Curb Your Enthusiasm | Television special |
| 1999−2024 | Curb Your Enthusiasm | |
| 2000−2007 | Gilmore Girls | |
| 2002 | Family Affair | |
| 2002−2003 | Hack | |
| 2003 | Untitled Howie Mandel Project | Television pilot |
| 2003 | The Ortegas | |
| 2003 | American P.I. | |
| 2004 | Celebrity Blackjack | |
| 2005 | Sports Illustrated Swimsuit Model Search | |
| 2005 | Revelations | |
| 2006 | Thief | |
| 2005−2007 | The Showbiz Show with David Spade | |
| 2006−2008 | Emily's Reasons Why Not | |
| 2006−2010 | My Boys | |
| 2007 | Tell Me You Love Me | |
| 2011 | Bachelorette Party: Las Vegas | |
| 2012 | Jane by Design | |
| 2013 | Zombieland | Television pilot |
| 2013−2014 | Twisted | |

Director

| Year | Title |
|---|---|
| 2012 | Jane by Design |
| 2013−2014 | Twisted |
| 2015 | Finding Carter |

Acting roles

| Year | Title | Role |
|---|---|---|
| 1993 | Seinfeld | Man in Jerry Audience |
| 1999 | Action | Dodi |

Special thanks

- Twisted: Socio Studies 101 (2013)

=== Television movies ===
Executive producer

- When Trumpets Fade (1998)
- Sam's Circus (2001)
- More, Patience (2001)
- Life at Five Feet (2002)
- Suspense (2003)
- Celebrity Temps (2003)
- D.O.T.S. (2004)
- The Angriest Man in Suburbia (2006)
- More, Patience (2006)
- Backyards & Bullets (2007)
- Cinema Verite (2011)
