= Paul Wernick =

American screenwriter

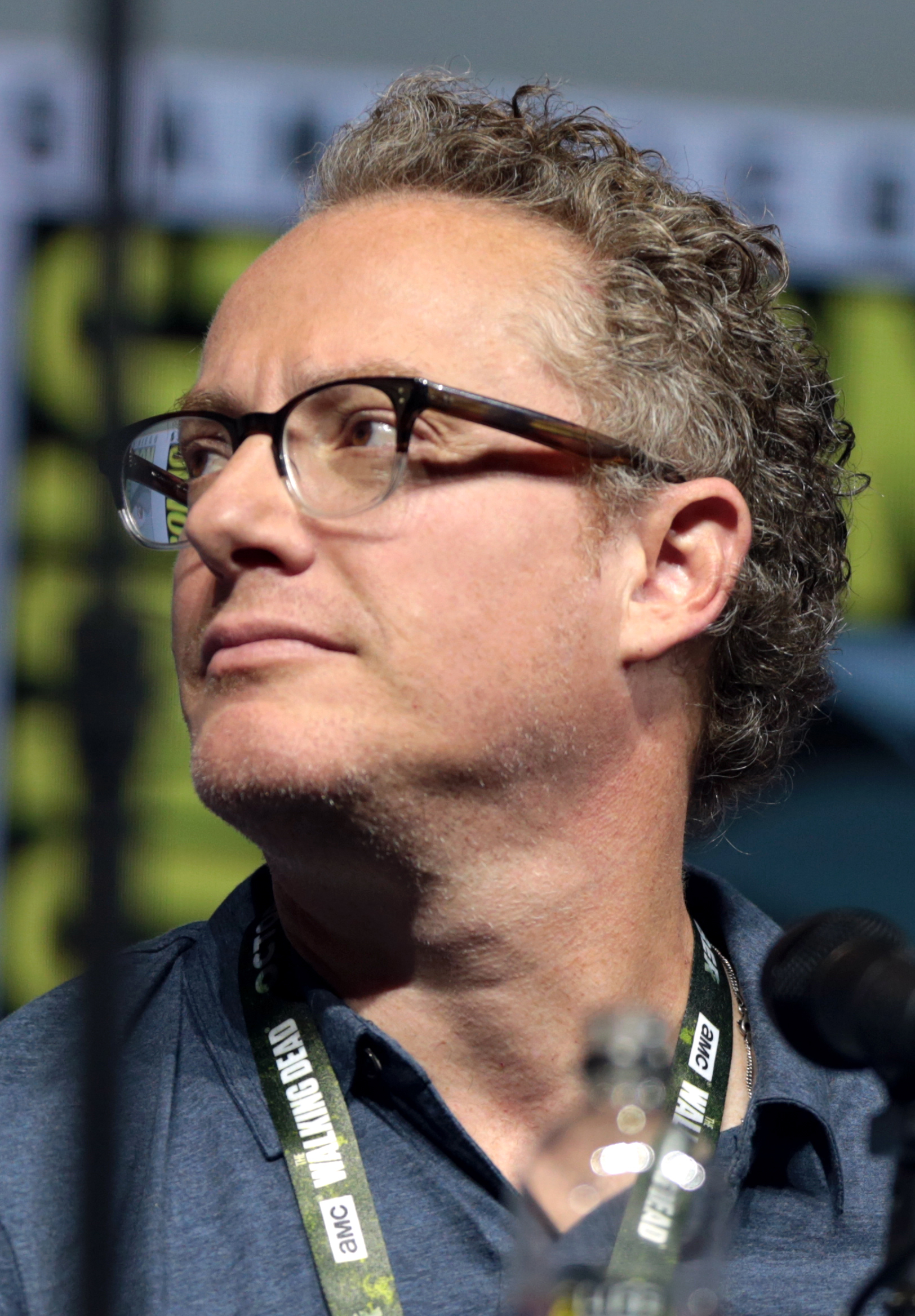
- Wernick at the 2018 San Diego Comic-Con
- Spouse: Rita Hsiao
- Children: 2

Paul Wernick is a Canadian screenwriter and producer. He is best known for writing screenplays for the Zombieland films and the Deadpool films with his creative partner Rhett Reese.

== Career ==
Wernick has produced several network reality shows, including CBS's Big Brother 2 and ABC's I'm a Celebrity... Get Me out of Here!. Wernick won three Emmy Awards for his work in news, which included producing stints at KVOA, KOLD, KTVK, KSL and KCAL.

Big Brother 2 inspired Wernick and Rhett Reese, a screenwriter friend of his brother back from Phoenix, Arizona, where both attended high school to create their own take on reality television, The Joe Schmo Show. Broadcast on Spike TV, the series drew the highest ratings for the channel. The Joe Schmo Show was also named on numerous Best Of lists, including Time magazine's "Top 10 TV Shows of 2003" and Entertainment Weekly's "50 Best TV Shows Ever on DVD."

In 2004, Reese and Wernick created and executive-produced Stuck on ODB, a comedy reality show starring Ol' Dirty Bastard (ODB) of the Wu Tang Clan for Spike TV. However, ODB died before the show ever aired. A year later, Wernick and Reese followed up with Invasion Iowa, a high-concept, high-stakes comedy hybrid starring William Shatner. The show premiered on Spike on March 29, 2005.

Wernick and Reese's first feature collaboration was the 2009 film Zombieland, which they created and also executive-produced. The film was released by Sony Pictures on October 2, 2009, and became the highest-grossing zombie film at the time.

Wernick and Reese followed Zombieland with Paramount Pictures' G.I. Joe: Retaliation (2013), starring Dwayne Johnson, Channing Tatum, and Bruce Willis. The sequel outperformed the original, grossing $375 million.

In February 2012, it was announced Universal Studios had acquired Wernick and Reese's script for a feature film adaptation of Cowboy Ninja Viking. In September 2012, their original science fiction spec screenplay Epsilon was sold to Sony Pictures, with plans to co-produce with Michael De Luca. In April 2015, Wernick and Reese had optioned Thomas Oliver's book The Real Coke, The Real Story to produce a film about the failed launch of New Coke.

== Filmography ==
Film

Year	Title	Writer	Executive Producer	Director
2009	Zombieland	Yes	Yes	Ruben Fleischer
2013	G.I. Joe: Retaliation	Yes	No	Jon M. Chu
2016	Deadpool	Yes	Yes	Tim Miller
2017	Life	Yes	No	Daniel Espinosa
2018	Deadpool 2	Yes	Yes	David Leitch
2019	6 Underground	Yes	Yes	Michael Bay
2019	Zombieland: Double Tap	Yes	Yes	Ruben Fleischer
2022	Spiderhead	Yes	No	Joseph Kosinski
2023	Ghosted	Yes	No	Dexter Fletcher
2024	Deadpool & Wolverine	Yes	Yes	Shawn Levy
2025	Now You See Me: Now You Don't	Yes	No	Ruben Fleischer
2025	Eenie Meanie	No	Producer	Shawn Simmons
2026	Balls Up	Yes	No	Peter Farrelly

Television

Year	Title	Writer	Producer	Creator
2005	Invasion Iowa	Yes	No	Yes
2003–2004, 2013	The Joe Schmo Show	Yes	Yes	Yes
2019	Wayne	Yes	Executive	No
2023–present	Twisted Metal	Yes	Yes	Yes
2023	The Continental: From the World of John Wick	No	Executive	No
