= Zombieland =

2009 film by Ruben Fleischer

- Theatrical release poster
- Directed by: Ruben Fleischer
- Written by: Rhett Reese; Paul Wernick
- Produced by: Gavin Polone
- Starring: Woody Harrelson; Jesse Eisenberg; Emma Stone; Abigail Breslin
- Narrated by: Jesse Eisenberg
- Cinematography: Michael Bonvillain
- Edited by: Peter Amundson; Alan Baumgarten
- Music by: David Sardy
- Production companies: Columbia Pictures; Relativity Media; Pariah
- Distributed by: Sony Pictures Releasing
- Release dates: September 25, 2009 (Fantastic Fest); October 2, 2009 (United States)
- Running time: 88 minutes
- Country: United States
- Language: English
- Budget: $23.6 million
- Box office: $102.4 million

Zombieland is a 2009 American post-apocalyptic zombie comedy film directed by Ruben Fleischer, in his directorial debut, and written by Rhett Reese and Paul Wernick. It stars Woody Harrelson, Jesse Eisenberg, Emma Stone, Abigail Breslin and Bill Murray. In the film, four survivors of a zombie apocalypse, Tallahassee (Harrelson), Columbus (Eisenberg), Wichita (Stone) and Little Rock (Breslin) make their way on an extended cross-country road trip to find a sanctuary free from a virus that turns people into zombies.

Development for Zombieland began in 2005, when Reese and Wernick originally wrote the film as a spec script for a television pilot. Fleischer helped develop the teleplay into a screenplay for a self-contained feature. Tony Gardner was hired as the film's special effects makeup designer, which primarily features physical prosthetics to create the look of the zombies. Principal photography for the film began in February 2009 and lasted until that March, with filming locations including Hollywood, Atlanta and in and around Georgia. Some of the film's scenes contained improvisation by the actors.

Zombieland premiered at Fantastic Fest on September 25, 2009, and was theatrically released in the United States on October 2, by Sony Pictures Releasing. The film received positive critical reception, with praise for its screenplay, dialogue, comedy, and cast performances. It grossed $102 million worldwide, becoming the tenth-highest grossing zombie film in the U.S. until the release of World War Z (2013), and $54 million in home sales. A sequel, Zombieland: Double Tap, was released in October 2019.

== Plot ==
Two months since a strain of mad cow disease mutated to become infectious to humans and turn them into zombies, survivors of the epidemic are advised to use their city of origin as nicknames when meeting other survivors, to not get too attached to them and protect themselves. Columbus, a former college student with a unique set of zombie survival rules, travels from Austin, Texas, towards Columbus, Ohio, to search for his parents. On the way, he meets Tallahassee, who reluctantly agrees to give Columbus a ride in his armored Escalade to Ohio. On the way, he mentions to Columbus that he misses his "puppy named Buck", who was killed by zombies.

The pair meet con artist sisters Wichita and Little Rock, who trick Tallahassee and Columbus and steal their weapons and truck after Little Rock feigns being bitten by a zombie. The two men find a yellow Hummer H2 loaded with weapons and continue on before running into another trap set by the girls, who take them hostage. Tallahassee steals his gun back and has a stand-off with Wichita, until Columbus intervenes saying that they have bigger problems to worry about, resulting in an uneasy truce between them.

The sisters reveal they are going to the Pacific Playland amusement park in Los Angeles, an area supposedly free of zombies. After learning his hometown has been destroyed, and his parents likely died, Columbus and Tallahassee decide to accompany them to the amusement park. When the group reaches Hollywood, Tallahassee directs them to Bill Murray's house. Tallahassee and Wichita meet Murray, uninfected and disguised as a zombie, and they play a prank on Columbus and Little Rock by having him pretend to be a zombie, only for Columbus to accidentally kill Murray. Columbus soon realizes during a game of Monopoly that "Buck" was actually Tallahassee's human son, who got infected and died as a result.

Despite Wichita and Columbus falling for each other, Wichita abruptly leaves with Little Rock for Pacific Playland the next morning. Columbus decides to go after Wichita and convinces Tallahassee to join him. At Pacific Playland, the sisters activate all the rides and lights, only to unwittingly draw the attention of many zombies in the area. They become trapped on a drop tower ride as Tallahassee and Columbus arrive. Tallahassee lures the zombies to a game booth and kills several as Columbus heads to the drop tower; he evades and shoots through a horde and safely helps the girls down. Wichita kisses Columbus and reveals her real name: Krista. Deciding to stick together from now on, the group then leaves Pacific Playland.

=== The rules ===
A running gag (and a central theme throughout the film) is the list of rules Columbus comes up with for surviving in the zombie-infested world. By the end of the film, his list has 33 rules, yet only a few are mentioned. A series of promotional videos starring Woody Harrelson and Jesse Eisenberg expanded on the list presented in the film.

1. "Cardio"
2. "Double tap" ("Ziploc bags" in a deleted scene, Zombieland: Double Tap added it as rule 23.)
3. "Beware of bathrooms"
4. "Seatbelts"
5. "No attachments"
6. "Cast iron skillet"
7. "Travel light"
8. "Get a kick-ass partner"
9. "With your bare hands"
10. "Don't swing low"
11. "Use your foot"
12. "Bounty paper towels"
13. "Shake it off"
14. "Always carry a change of underwear"
15. "Bowling ball"
16. "Opportunity knocks"
17. "Don't be a hero"; Columbus later changes the rule to "Be a hero" at the amusement park, after facing his greatest fear (a clown-zombie) to help Wichita and Little Rock.
18. "Limber up"
19. "Break it up"
20. "It's a marathon, not a sprint, unless it's a sprint, then sprint"
21. "Avoid strip clubs"
22. "When in doubt, know your way out"
24. "Use your thumbs"
25. "Shoot first"
26. "A little sunscreen never hurt anybody"
27. "Incoming!"
28. "Double-knot your shoes"
29. "The buddy system"
30. "Pack your stain stick"
31. "Check the back seat"
32. "Enjoy the little things"
33. "Swiss army knife"
34. "Clean socks"
48. "Hygiene"
49. "Always have backup"

Wichita and Little Rock have their own rule: "Trust no one. Just you and me."

== Cast ==
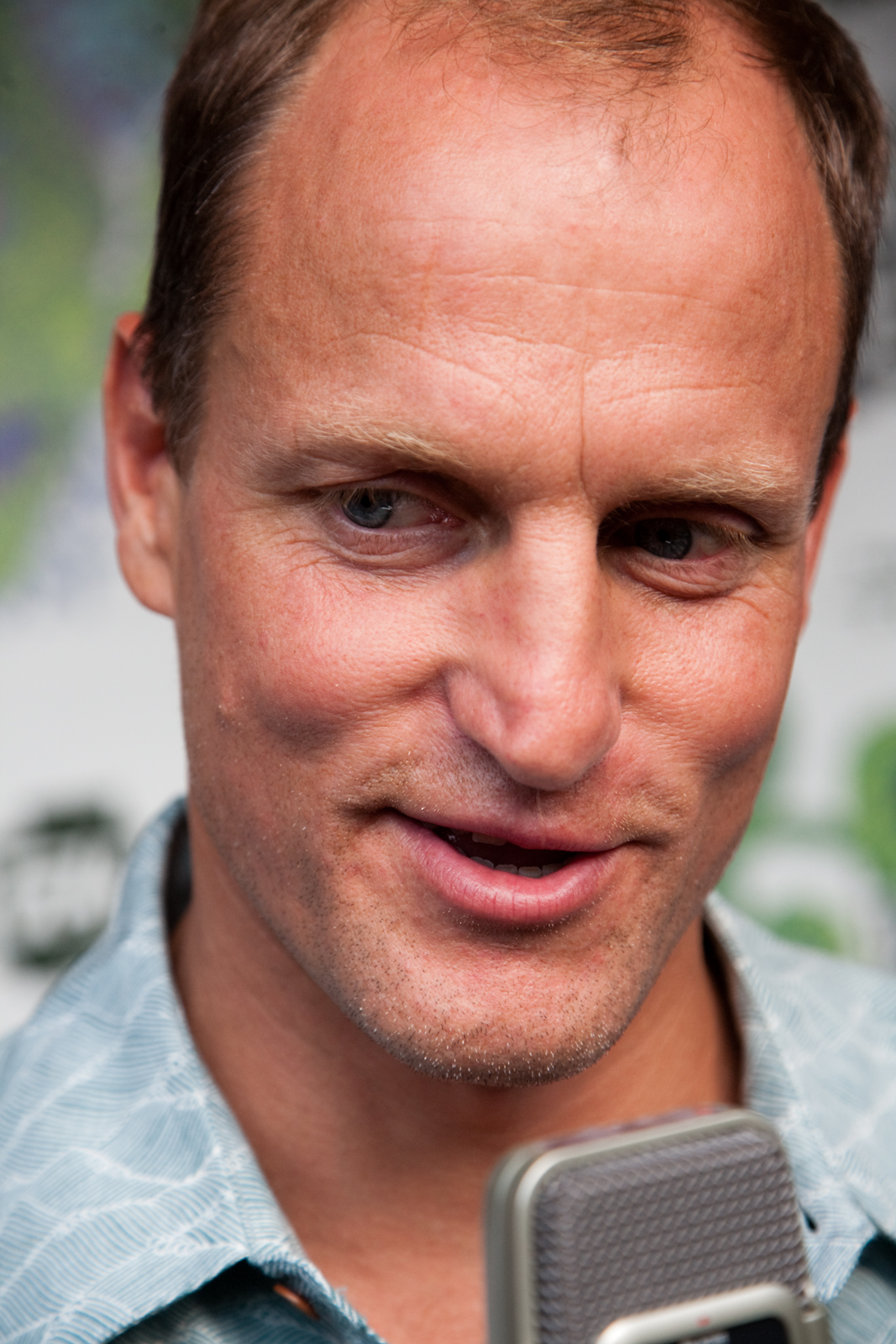
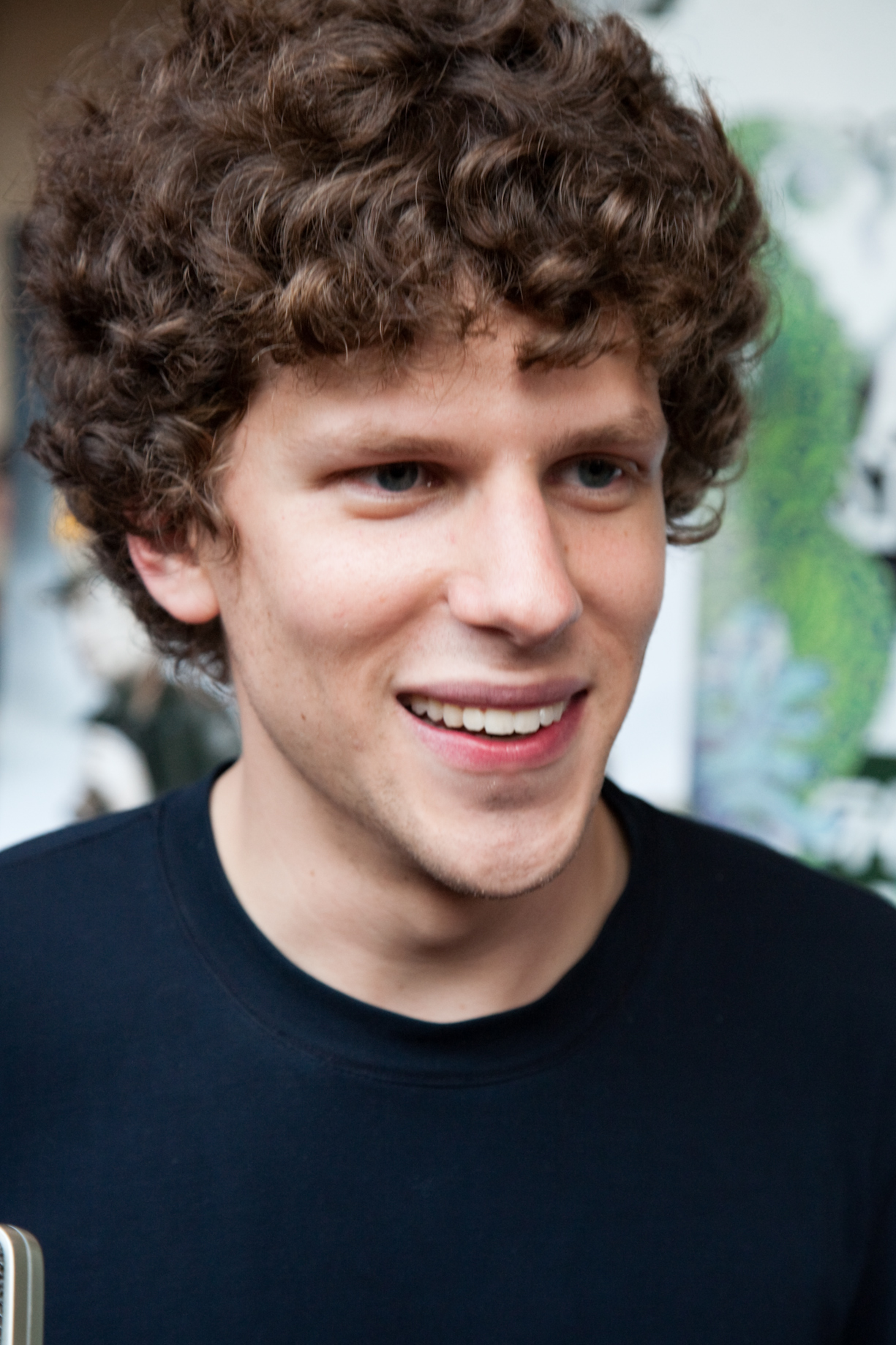
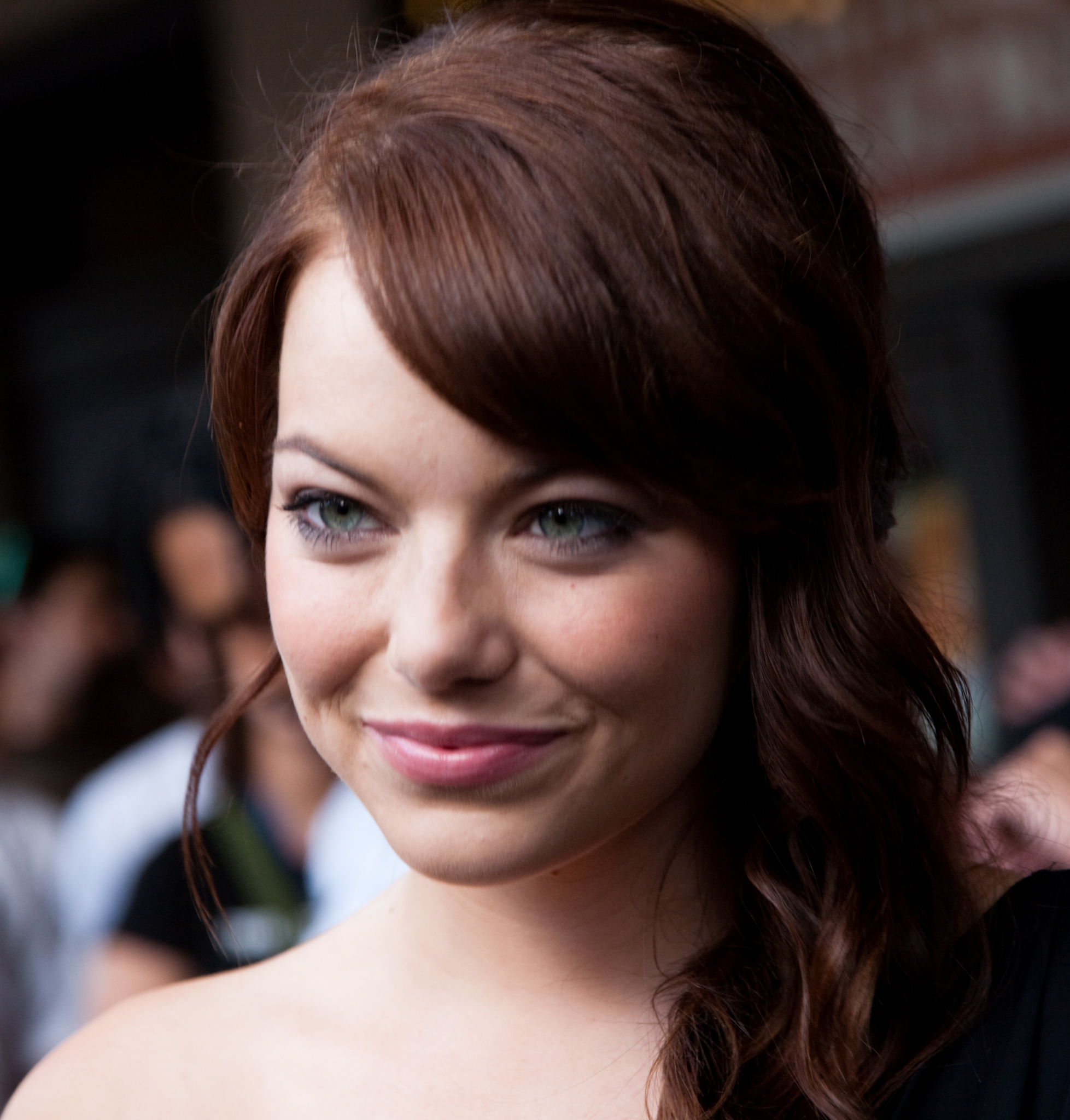
Left to right: Woody Harrelson, Jesse Eisenberg and Emma Stone at the film's premiere, at FantasticFest 2009
- Jesse Eisenberg as Columbus, a young man who lived by himself in a beat-up apartment before becoming one of the few survivors of the zombie apocalypse. He lives by a strict set of rules to stay alive. The character is also the narrator of the film.
- Woody Harrelson as Tallahassee, Columbus's trusted partner who spends the majority of the movie searching for a Twinkie. He despises zombies and enjoys killing and torturing them.
- Emma Stone as Wichita / Krista, Little Rock's older sister and Columbus's love interest. She is distrustful of strangers, and overly protective of her little sister.
- Abigail Breslin as Little Rock, Wichita's 12-year-old sister. She is sweet, but not that innocent and has had to grow up very quickly because of the apocalypse.
- Bill Murray as a fictionalized version of himself, still living in his Los Angeles home and regularly disguising himself as a zombie to travel around the area.
- Amber Heard as 406, Columbus's ill-fated neighbor who becomes the first zombie he kills.

=== Character names ===
The main characters do not use each other's real names but identify themselves using place names (Columbus, Tallahassee, Wichita, and Little Rock) that relate to them. This includes Columbus's neighbor, named 406 after her room, and his fictional sexual conquest Beverly Hills, as well as Sister Cynthia Knickerbocker, whom Columbus identifies as a "Zombie Kill of the Week" winner, and whose surname is actually an obsolete term for a citizen or inhabitant of New York City. The one exception is Murray playing himself. At the end of the film, Wichita tells Columbus that her real name is Krista.

== Production ==
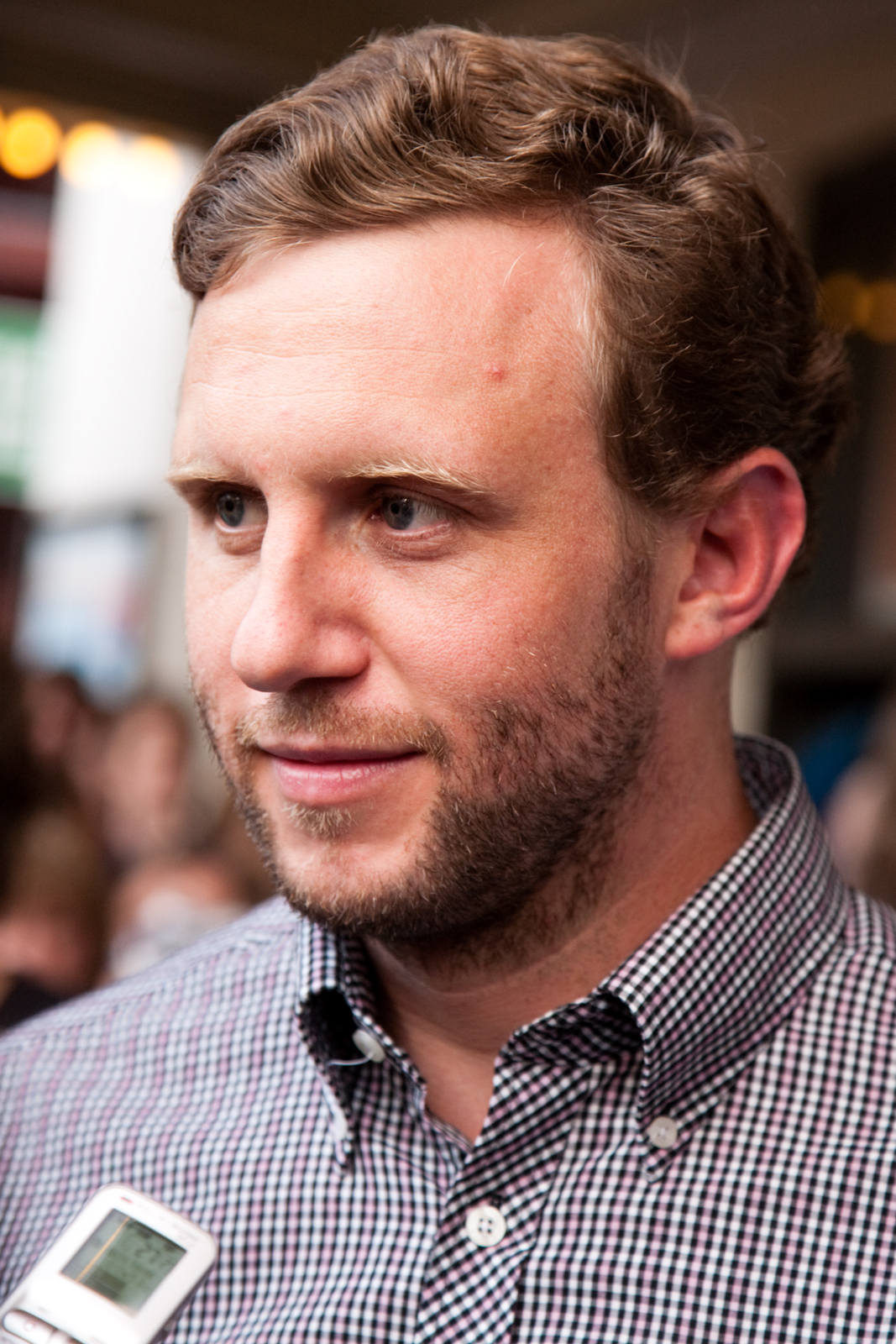
Ruben Fleischer at the film's premiere

=== Writing ===
Writers Rhett Reese and Paul Wernick stated that the idea for Zombieland had "lived in [their] heads" for four-and-a-half years. The story was originally developed as a spec script for a television pilot in the summer of 2005. Wernick stated, "We've got a long brainstorming document that still to this day gets updated on a near-weekly basis with ideas". Director Ruben Fleischer helped develop the script from a series into a self-contained feature by providing a specific destination to the road story, the amusement park. Earlier versions of the script called the protagonists Flagstaff and Albuquerque, rather than Columbus and Tallahassee, and the female characters were called Wichita and Stillwater.

=== Casting ===
Woody Harrelson accepted the role on four conditions, two of which were about casting and crew. The third condition required the film to have an environmentally conscious set. The fourth condition required that the director will not eat dairy products for a week, a task that Fleischer described as "like for an alcoholic not to drink". He succeeded and maintained a vegetarian diet for 11 months.

The cameo role was originally written for Patrick Swayze, as a zombified, dancing character, including references to highlights of Swayze's career, even including a recreation of the potter's wheel scene from Ghost. However, Swayze was battling pancreatic cancer at the time and was too sick to make it to set. Swayze died in September 2009. Later versions of the script considered Sylvester Stallone, Joe Pesci, Mark Hamill, Dwayne Johnson, Kevin Bacon, Jean-Claude Van Damme, or Matthew McConaughey as the celebrity. The actor cast in the part dropped out a week before filming, and Harrelson made a few calls and was able to get Bill Murray to play the part instead. According to Harrelson most of the scene was improvised.

=== Filming and design ===
Zombieland zombies in a scene from the film's climax

Principal photography began February 2009 in Hollywood, California, with scenes being shot at Scream Fest Theme Park and other locations. Filming continued in March in Atlanta, Hapeville, Morrow, Decatur, Newnan and Powder Springs, Georgia, where actress Abigail Breslin celebrated her 13th birthday by adopting a shelter puppy. Zombieland was filmed in digital, using the Panavision Genesis digital camera and had a 41-day shooting schedule.

The theme-park scenes for the film's climax, Pacific Playland, were mostly shot in Valdosta's local theme park Wild Adventures Water and Theme Park. Some of the amusement rides prominently featured in the film include Pharaoh's Fury, the Double Shot (redubbed "Blast Off"), the Rattler, the Aviator, and the Bug Out. A haunted-house facade was constructed at the theme park, but the interior was filmed on location at Netherworld Haunted House outside Atlanta.

Special effects makeup designer Tony Gardner, who helped Rick Baker create the signature look of Michael Jackson's zombie-featured music video "Thriller", was brought on to design the look of the film's zombies. Michael Bonvillain, who was cinematographer for the found footage film Cloverfield, was brought on for the "lively" hand-held camerawork. "Basically, it's the end of the world; the entire nation is zombies", stated Gardner. "And [the humans] are trying to get from the east coast to the west coast". For one shooting scene, Gardner said, "There were 160 zombies, in prosthetics, on set in an amusement park". He said it is "how you present yourself as a zombie that determines how people will react to you" and that "once the contact lenses go in", he thinks "all bets are off".

Gardner said he was excited about working on the film with first-time filmmaker Fleischer, who gave him free rein in his zombie design. "[We] are just trying to be real extreme with it", stated Gardner, "and trying to balance the scares out with the comedy". He described having to makeover physically attractive actors who usually benefit from their looks as "a little off-putting" after seeing some of them in their character makeup for the first time.

The zombies in Zombieland were described by the casting director as: "Ferocious, infected people who move erratically. They are diseased, as opposed to undead. These are not the lumbering walking dead of Romero's zombie movies, but instead the super jacked up 28 Days Later/Dawn of the Dead zombies. They are scary, gnarly, and gross.

Harrelson had input into the wardrobe for his character, Tallahassee. "I never worked so long and hard on an outfit in my life," he stated. "What this guy wears is who he is. You want to get a sense of this guy as soon as you see him. So I pick out the necklaces, the sunglasses. But the hat? The minute you see that on Tallahassee, you buy him. He's real. And he's got a real cool hat". Harrelson's choice of headwear for Tallahassee came not just down to style, but also to his environmental passions: the distinctive hat is handmade in Brazil by a company called the Real Deal using recycled cargo-truck tarps and wire from old truck tires.

Shortly after finishing the filming of Zombieland, Harrelson had an altercation with a TMZ photographer at New York City's LaGuardia Airport. His defense was that he was still in character and thought the cameraman was a zombie.

=== Effects ===
The special-effects team created several visual elements, including "The Rules for Survival", which appear on-screen as they are related to the audience by Columbus: "Do cardio", "Beware of bathrooms", "Check the back seat", and so forth. The texts are rendered in three dimensions. "When a previously stated rule becomes relevant—when nature calls, for instance—the relevant text pops up, occasionally getting splattered with blood." Slate's Josh Levin said, "The pop-up bit works precisely because Zombieland unspools like a game—how can you survive a zombie horde armed with a shotgun, an SUV and a smart mouth?"

== Release ==
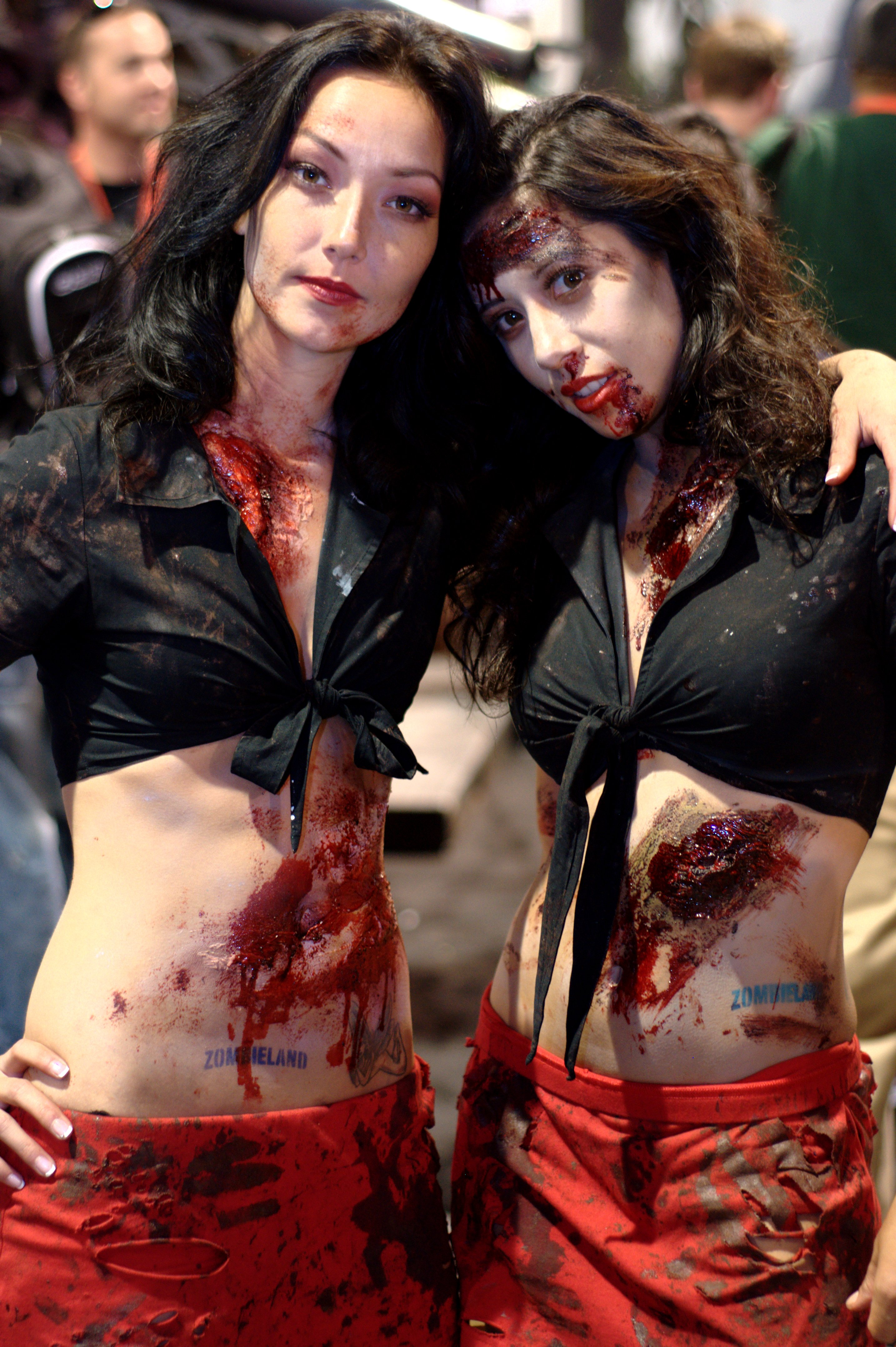
Models promoting the film at the 2009 San Diego Comic-Con

A trailer of Zombieland was released on June 18, 2009. Distributed by Sony Pictures Releasing's Columbia Pictures, the film was released on October 2, 2009, a week earlier than originally advertised.

=== Home media ===
Zombieland was released by Sony Pictures Home Entertainment on February 2, 2010, on Blu-ray and DVD. The film was released on March 15, 2010, on DVD and Blu-ray in the UK. Select Best Buy stores sold a special edition on both DVD and Blu-ray with an additional disc featuring two featurettes. It was also released as a film for the PSP UMD.

The film grossed $54.1 million in home sales.

Zombieland was released on Ultra HD Blu-ray on October 1, 2019, a few weeks before the sequel was released in theatres.

== Reception ==
=== Box office ===
The film debuted at number one at the box office in North America, with ticket sales of $24,733,155 over its opening weekend, averaging about $8,147 from 3,036 theaters, matching its production budget. It was credited as having the second-highest-grossing start on record for a zombie film behind the 2004 Dawn of the Dead remake, and as "the first American horror comedy in recent memory to find significant theatrical success". The film grossed $60.8 million in 17 days, becoming the top-grossing zombie film in history; the record was previously held by the Dawn of the Dead remake. It was later surpassed by Resident Evil: Afterlife which grossed over $290 million worldwide and World War Z which grossed over $540 million worldwide. Zombieland closed on December 13, 2009, with a final gross of $75,590,286 in North America and $26,801,254 in other territories for a worldwide gross of $102,391,540.

=== Critical response ===
Zombieland received positive reviews from critics. On Rotten Tomatoes the film has an approval rating of 89% based on reviews from 259 critics, with a rating average of 7.4/10. The website's consensus reads: "Wickedly funny and featuring plenty of gore, Zombieland is proof that the zombie subgenre is far from dead." On Metacritic, which assigns a weighted average rating to reviews from mainstream critics, the film holds a score of 73 out of 100 based on 31 reviews, indicating "generally favorable reviews". Audiences surveyed by CinemaScore during the opening weekend, gave Zombieland an average grade of "A−" on an A+ to F scale.

Roger Ebert was surprised by Zombieland's ability to be significantly humorous while zombies remained the focus of the film, and felt that "all of this could have been dreary, but not here. The filmmakers show invention and well-tuned comic timing". He credited Bill Murray's cameo appearance as receiving the "single biggest laugh" of the year and gave the film 3 out of 4 stars. Murray's cameo was called out for attention by other reviewers: Marc Savlov of the Austin Chronicle credited it as "the single most outrageously entertaining unexpected celebrity cameo of any film—genre or otherwise—" that he had seen in a "long, long time" and that while the film did little to advance the genre, its smart script and high action made it very enjoyable. Savlov categorized Zombieland as being "dead set against being dead serious" with its tonal pallor "ha[ving] more in common with a foreshortened It's a Mad, Mad, Mad, Mad World than with 28 Days or Weeks Later".

The film's witty use of dialogue and popular culture was also praised by Ty Burr of The Boston Globe, who said the film "makes no claims to greatness", but that what it "has instead—in spades—is deliciously weary end-of-the-world banter". Michael Ordona of Los Angeles Times praised director Fleischer for "bring[ing] impeccable timing and bloodthirsty wit to the proceedings".

Some reviewers saw deeper levels in the plot and cinematography; cinematographer Michael Bonvillain was praised for capturing "some interesting images amid the postapocalyptic carnival of carnage, as when he transforms the destruction of a souvenir shop into a rough ballet", while Stephanie Zacharek of Salon.com said, "the picture is beautifully paced" and highlighted "a halcyon middle section where, in what could be viewed as a sideways homage to Rebel Without a Cause, our rootless wanderers share a brief respite in an empty, lavish mansion".

Claudia Puig of USA Today said, "underlying the carnage in Zombieland is a sweetly beating heart", and, "This road movie/horror flick/dark comedy/earnest romance/action film hybrid laces a gentle drollness through all the bloody mayhem". Entertainment Weekly's Lisa Schwarzbaum concluded, "At the bone, Zombieland is a polished, very funny road picture shaped by wisenheimer cable-TV sensibilities and starring four likable actors, each with an influential following".

Josh Levin of Slate drew parallels with Adventureland: in both films, Jesse Eisenberg tries to win over his dream girl, a girl who has been hardened by life, and both feature a theme park. He goes so far as to call the film "an undead Adventureland—a Pride and Prejudice and Zombies for the Facebook generation".

Time's Richard Corliss described the film as "an exhilarating ride, start to finish" and reasoned "Edgar Wright and Simon Pegg set a high bar for this subgenre with Shaun of the Dead, but Reese, Wernick, and Fleischer may have trumped them". "This isn't just a good zombie comedy. It's a damn fine movie, period. And that's high praise, coming from a vampire guy", he stated.

Not all comparisons with Shaun of the Dead were favorable: Joshua Rothkopf of Time Out New York characterized the "extra injection of pop-culture neuroticism" as "the one innovation" of the film, declaring that while Zombieland was funny, it was not particularly scary and stated that it "simply isn't as witty as Shaun of the Dead, forever the yuks-meet-yucks standard". Similarly, The Globe and Mail's Rick Groen said "It's far more charming than chilling and way more funny than frightening", though he suggested that Rule No. 32 to 'enjoy the little things' was worth observing for a light comedy. Manohla Dargis of The New York Times classified the film as "[a] minor diversion dripping in splatter and groaning with self-amusement" and lamented the lack of a real plot more concrete than a series of comedy takes on zombie-slaying.

Rotten Tomatoes lists the film on its 100 Best Zombie Movies, Ranked by Tomatometer.

=== Accolades ===
List of awards and nominations
Award	Category	Recipients	Result
Broadcast Film Critics Association	Best Comedy Movie	Zombieland	Nominated
Detroit Film Critics Society	Best Supporting Actor	Woody Harrelson	Nominated
Detroit Film Critics Society	Best Ensemble	Abigail Breslin; Jesse Eisenberg; Woody Harrelson; Amber Heard; Bill Murray; Emma Stone	Nominated
Empire Awards	Best Horror	Zombieland	Nominated
Golden Schmoes	Best Comedy of the Year	Zombieland	Nominated
Golden Schmoes	Best Horror Movie of the Year	Zombieland	Won
Golden Schmoes	Biggest Surprise of the Year	Zombieland	Nominated
Golden Schmoes	Coolest Character of the Year	Tallahassee (Woody Harrelson)	Nominated
Golden Schmoes	Best Action Sequence of the Year	Tallahassee vs. the Amusement Park	Nominated
Golden Schmoes	Most Memorable Scene of the Year	Bill Murray cameo	Won
Golden Schmoes	Best T&A of the Year	Emma Stone	Nominated
MTV Movie Awards	Best Scared-As-S**t Performance	Jesse Eisenberg	Nominated
MTV Movie Awards	Best WTF Moment	"Bill Murray?! A Zombie?!"	Nominated
Saturn Awards	Best Horror Film	Zombieland	Nominated
Saturn Awards	Best Supporting Actor	Woody Harrelson	Nominated
Sitges Film Festival	Audience Award	Ruben Fleischer	Won
Scream Awards	Ultimate Scream	Zombieland	Nominated
Scream Awards	Best Horror Movie	Zombieland	Won
Scream Awards	Best Scream-Play	Rhett Reese; Paul Wernick	Nominated
Scream Awards	Best Horror Actress	Emma Stone	Nominated
Scream Awards	Best Horror Actor	Woody Harrelson	Nominated
Scream Awards	Best Supporting Actress	Abigail Breslin	Nominated
Scream Awards	Best Cameo	Bill Murray	Won
Scream Awards	Best Ensemble	Abigail Breslin; Jesse Eisenberg; Woody Harrelson; Amber Heard; Bill Murray; Emma Stone	Won
Scream Awards	Best F/X	Zombieland	Nominated
St. Louis Gateway Film Critics Association	Best Comedy	Zombieland	Nominated
Teen Choice Awards	Choice Movie Actress: Comedy	Emma Stone	Nominated
Teen Choice Awards	Choice Movie: Breakout Actor	Jesse Eisenberg	Nominated

== Soundtrack ==
The film's music was composed by David Sardy. The soundtrack was released on October 6, 2009, by Relativity Music Group.

The song For Whom the Bell Tolls by the band Metallica was used in the opening credits scene.

== Franchise ==
=== Zombieland: Double Tap ===
Due to the film's success, writers Reese and Wernick always planned a possible sequel, with many more ideas they wanted to explore. In August 2016, Reese and Wernick confirmed that they were working on Zombieland 2 and meeting with Woody Harrelson to discuss the film, while stating "all the cast is pretty excited."

The film, Zombieland: Double Tap, featuring the return of the original cast, was released on October 18, 2019, the tenth anniversary of the original film's release, and was once again a critical and financial success.

=== Possible third film ===
On the possibility of a third film, Fleischer can not decide if the cast will return or not. He has stated that he "would love to do a Madison stand-alone movie."

=== Cancelled television series ===
In October 2011, it was reported that Fox Broadcasting Company and Sony Pictures were considering a television adaption of the series to be aired on CBS, with Paul Wernick and Rhett Reese writing the script, but with the main actors of the original film likely not returning. The television program was planned to begin in the fall of 2012. These plans did not come to fruition. In January 2013, it was revealed that the casting call for the production just went out for the main characters, with a few changes to the movie for the show and the addition of two new characters, Atlanta and Ainsley.

In March 2013, it was announced that Amazon Studios had ordered a pilot episode. Reese, Wernick, and Polone were joined by Eli Craig, who directed the pilot. Tyler Ross plays Columbus, Kirk Ward plays Tallahassee, Maiara Walsh plays Wichita and Izabela Vidovic plays Little Rock. A new character named Detroit (voiced by Kendra Fountain) was introduced as an ex-OnStar operator, serving as the gang's navigator. The pilot was released in April 2013 on Lovefilm and at Amazon Video. On May 17, 2013, Rhett Reese, creator of the TV adaptation, announced that Zombieland: The Series would not be picked up to be a series by Amazon. Reese commented on the fan backlash, saying "I'll never understand the vehement hate the pilot received from die-hard Zombieland fans. You guys successfully hated it out of existence."
