= Zombieland: Double Tap =

2019 film by Ruben Fleischer

- Theatrical release poster
- Directed by: Ruben Fleischer
- Written by: Rhett Reese; Paul Wernick; David Callaham
- Based on: Characters by: Rhett Reese; Paul Wernick
- Produced by: Gavin Polone
- Starring: Woody Harrelson; Jesse Eisenberg; Emma Stone; Abigail Breslin; Rosario Dawson; Zoey Deutch; Luke Wilson; Avan Jogia; Thomas Middleditch
- Cinematography: Chung-hoon Chung
- Edited by: Dirk Westervelt
- Music by: David Sardy
- Production companies: Columbia Pictures; 2.0 Entertainment; Pariah; Reese/Wernick Productions
- Distributed by: Sony Pictures Releasing
- Release dates: October 10, 2019 (Los Angeles); October 18, 2019 (United States)
- Running time: 99 minutes
- Country: United States
- Language: English
- Budget: $42–48 million
- Box office: $125.2 million

Zombieland: Double Tap is a 2019 American post-apocalyptic zombie comedy film directed by Ruben Fleischer and written by Rhett Reese, Paul Wernick, and David Callaham. The sequel to Zombieland (2009), it stars an ensemble cast including Woody Harrelson, Jesse Eisenberg, Abigail Breslin, Emma Stone (all reprising their roles), Rosario Dawson, Zoey Deutch, Avan Jogia, Luke Wilson, and Thomas Middleditch. In the sequel, Tallahassee (Harrelson), Columbus (Eisenberg), and Wichita (Stone) face evolved zombies and encounter other survivors as they travel from the White House to Graceland to search for Little Rock (Breslin).

A sequel to the original film began development in November 2009, with the returns of Reese, Wernick, Fleischer and the main cast planned. It soon faced several delays, and the writers instead wrote a Zombieland television pilot in 2013 featuring a new cast, which ultimately failed in being ordered for a series release. Development for the sequel film was revived in February 2016, the screenplay was completed in March 2017, and the film was confirmed in July 2018. The rest of the cast was rounded out under a year later, and principal photography began in January 2019 and concluded that March, with filming primarily taking place in Atlanta.

Zombieland: Double Tap premiered in Los Angeles on October 10, 2019, was theatrically released in the United States on October 18, by Sony Pictures Releasing. It received mostly positive reviews from critics, who found it to be a worthwhile successor to the original and praised the cast performances (particularly those of Stone and Deutch). The film grossed $125 million worldwide, surpassing its predecessor.

== Plot ==
Ten years after the zombie outbreak, (Note: As depicted in Zombieland (2009)) Tallahassee, Columbus, Wichita and Little Rock encounter new strains of zombies: "Homers" (slow and dumb), "Hawkings" (partial intelligence), and "Ninjas" (silent and deadly).

Living in the White House, Tallahassee rebuffs Little Rock's hopes of searching for a boyfriend, while Columbus awkwardly proposes to Wichita. The day after they celebrate Christmas, Tallahassee finds a note from the girls, revealing they took off in a weaponized version of The Beast. A month later, while exploring a mall, Columbus and Tallahassee meet dumb blonde Madison, who survived the apocalypse hiding in a Pinkberry store. The guys take her back to the White House, where she and Columbus have sex. Tallahassee hears a noise in the garage, and he and Columbus investigate to find Wichita has returned for more weapons and ammo. She reveals Little Rock stole The Beast and left for Graceland with Berkeley, a mysterious pacifist.

Fearing for Little Rock's safety, the group heads to Graceland. Attempting to switch cars, they fight off a horde of zombies, leading to Madison being scratched on the foot by a Ninja and being saved by Columbus. The last zombie in the bunch is labelled "T-800": a strain which can only be killed by completely destroying the head. Retreating in their original car, Madison appears to be turning into a zombie; this forces them to pull over, and Columbus decides to lead her into the forest to kill her.

The trio arrives at a ruined Graceland, with no sign of Little Rock, Berkeley, or The Beast. They discover The Beast at a nearby Elvis-themed motel and meet Nevada, who reveals Little Rock and Berkeley took another vehicle to Babylon, a hippie commune. Nevada and Tallahassee spend the night together. The next morning, The Beast is crushed by a monster truck owned by Albuquerque and Flagstaff, who share history with Nevada. They then encounter several T-800s, leading to Albuquerque and Flagstaff getting bitten and ultimately killed by Tallahassee and Columbus.

While traveling to Babylon, they encounter Madison driving an ice cream truck heading in the same direction. She explains her nut allergy caused symptoms similar to zombification and that Columbus spared her life by shooting above her head to scare her off. Arriving in Babylon, the group gives up their weapons and finds Little Rock and Berkeley. Tallahassee decides to go out on his own, now that he knows Little Rock is safe. As he departs, however, he sees a horde of T-800s drawn to the commune's fireworks and devises a plan to kill them: using exploding biodiesel, he tells the commune, armed with barricade shields, to corral the zombies off of a nearby skyscraper, with himself as the bait.

With the exploding biodiesel ineffective, the commune is overwhelmed until Nevada arrives in Albuquerque's truck, rescuing them. They take out several zombies, causing the vehicle to roll over. Escaping to the skyscraper, they corral the zombies off the roof. Tallahassee uses a construction crane hook to dangle out of reach, but a zombie seizes his leg as it falls. Using a gun previously gifted to her by Tallahassee, Little Rock shoots the zombie and rescues him. The group then reconciles: Wichita accepts Columbus' proposal, while Madison and Berkeley get together, as do Nevada and Tallahassee. The original quartet, including Nevada, then departs Babylon.

During the film's mid-credits scene, the narration cuts back to 2009. At the start of the outbreak, Bill Murray witnesses Al Roker turn into a zombie during a promotional interview for a third Garfield film. He kills several zombies, including Lili Estefan, and escapes. In the post-credits scene, an outtake of Murray making Estefan break character by trying to cough up a hairball is shown.

=== The rules ===
Continuing the rules from Zombieland, Columbus's list of 73 rules includes:

23. "Ziploc bags"
36. "Sunscreen"
42. "Keep your hands to yourself"
52. "Don't be afraid to ask for help"
53. "Wet naps"

Flagstaff's commandments or rules for staying alive:

1. "Teamwork"
5. "Confirm your kill"
12. "The world is your bathroom"
13. "Avoid perishables"
16. "Expect the unexpected"
20. "Warm up"
28. "Shade"
29. "Cardiovascular fitness"
45. "Mind your manners"

Tallahassee considers adding a rule of his own: "It takes a real man to drive a pink Cadillac"

Madison's rule for surviving Zombieland: "Mostly stay in the freezer."

== Cast ==
- Woody Harrelson as Tallahassee, Columbus' trusted partner
- Jesse Eisenberg as Columbus, who survives thanks to a strict set of rules
- Emma Stone as Wichita / Krista, a hardened survivor who is reluctant to settle down with Columbus
- Abigail Breslin as Little Rock, Wichita's rebellious younger sister
- Rosario Dawson as Nevada, owner of an Elvis-themed motel
- Zoey Deutch as Madison, a dumb blonde who has been living in a mall since the zombie apocalypse began when she was 14
- Luke Wilson as Albuquerque, Flagstaff's partner whose personality mirrors Tallahassee
- Avan Jogia as Berkeley, a pacifist, whom Little Rock picks up
- Thomas Middleditch as Flagstaff, Albuquerque's partner who has his own set of commandments for survival, and whose personality mirrors Columbus'

A mid-credits scene features Bill Murray reprising his role as a fictionalized version of himself being interviewed by Al Roker, Lili Estefan, Josh Horowitz, and Grace Randolph (also as fictionalized versions of themselves) during the final minutes before the zombie apocalypse hit them, promoting a fictitious Garfield 3.

== Production ==
=== Development ===
After Zombieland's success, writers Rhett Reese and Paul Wernick soon planned a possible sequel, with many more ideas they wanted to explore. "We would love it, and everybody involved creatively wants to do another one," Wernick said in 2009. "Woody Harrelson came up to us after the final cut of the last scene and gave us a hug and said, 'I've never wanted to do a sequel in the previous movies I've done until this one.'" Wernick said he wanted to have Jesse Eisenberg, Harrelson, Emma Stone, and Abigail Breslin star again, with Ruben Fleischer returning as the director, and that the writers had "tons of new ideas swimming in their heads." Additionally, they wanted to make the comedy into an enduring franchise. "We would love to do several sequels," stated Wernick. "We would love to also see it on television. It would make a wonderful TV series." From this, they wrote a TV pilot, starring a different cast, released in April 2013 on Lovefilm and Amazon Video.

At the time of the first film's release, Reese and Wernick said they were not planning on an immediate sequel, due to being heavily involved with other writing projects. By November 2009, the original cast and director were all set to return, with Fleischer enthusiastic about the idea of making the sequel in 3D. In 2010, Fleischer stated that he was working on the screenplay, and the creators had begun searching for another "superstar cameo".

In July 2011, Eisenberg said that he was "not sure what's happening" with the sequel, but that the writers were working on Zombieland 2. He also expressed concern that a sequel would no longer be "relevant". Harrelson said that he was hesitant to return for a sequel as well, adding, "It's one thing to do it when it came out real good and it made a lot of people laugh, but then do a sequel? I don't know. I don't feel like a sequels guy."

In February 2016, the project was officially revived, with Reese and Wernick again set to write the script. In August 2016, Reese and Wernick confirmed that they were working on Zombieland 2 and meeting with Woody Harrelson to discuss the film, while stating "all the cast is pretty excited."

In March 2017, it was revealed that the script for Zombieland 2 had been completed, with Wernick and Reese stating:

It is [in active development]. We're trying to get it going. All of our cast have read the script and love it. Ruben Fleischer is signed on. It's just a matter of making our cast deals and making it for a budget number. All the cast have become superstars now so, we made Zombieland with 20 million, so it's trying to fit that financial model into the sequel model so it makes sense for the studio and being able to pay the actors what they now get paid and deserve to get paid. We see [film executive] Tom Rothman pretty frequently now and we're pestering that dude. He's like, 'Please, enough with the Zombieland talk!' We're pestering him the way we pestered Fox on Deadpool. We're not letting it go. We really want to see Zombieland 2.

In May 2018, Harrelson said that he hoped the film would be in production by early 2019, and that it would be released in time for the original's tenth anniversary.

=== Pre-production ===
On July 13, 2018, Zombieland: Double Tap was officially greenlit by Sony Pictures. Ruben Fleischer returned to direct while Eisenberg, Harrelson, Stone and Breslin reprised their roles. Sanford Panitch, president of Columbia Pictures, declared in a press release:

This is one of those projects that fans have wanted to see happen for a long time—and no one wanted to see it happen more than Emma, Woody, Jesse and Abigail. These are some of the most in-demand actors, and I think they are making this movie because they love these characters. We are thrilled Ruben was willing to come back to direct the sequel, as his work on Venom has been truly amazing.

In November 2018, Zoey Deutch and Avan Jogia joined the cast. In December 2018, it was confirmed that Bill Murray would return for the sequel, once again playing the fictionalized version of himself. In January 2019, Rosario Dawson joined the cast of the film. Thomas Middleditch and Luke Wilson joined in February. The writers originally envisioned Ryan Reynolds in the role of Bill, but scheduling conflicts and family obligations prevented him starring in the film.

=== Filming ===
Filming began on January 19, 2019, in Atlanta, Georgia. Primary production finished on March 15, 2019. The building used for the Babylon commune is located in Atlanta near the spaghetti junction. It was used for a hotel for many years, and is now abandoned. The film was also shot at Pinewood Atlanta Studios.

== Release ==
The film was released in the United States on October 18, 2019. Worldwide, Sony spent about $60 million on prints and advertising for the film.

=== Home media ===
Zombieland: Double Tap was released on Digital HD on December 24, 2019, and on DVD, Blu-ray, and Ultra HD Blu-ray on January 21, 2020. The film grossed $16.7 million in home sales.

== Reception ==
=== Box office ===
Zombieland: Double Tap grossed $73.1 million in the United States and Canada, and $52.1 million in other territories, for a worldwide total of $125.2 million.

In the United States and Canada, the film was released alongside Maleficent: Mistress of Evil, and was projected to gross $25–30 million from 3,468 theaters in its opening weekend. The film made $10.2 million on its first day, including $2.85 million from Thursday night previews. It went on to debut to $26.8 million, finishing third, behind Maleficent and Joker. It then dropped 56% in its second weekend to $11.8 million, finishing fourth, and made $7.4 million in its third weekend, finishing sixth.

=== Critical response ===
On Rotten Tomatoes, the film holds an approval rating of 68% based on 258 reviews, with an average rating of 6.2/10. The site's critical consensus reads, "Zombieland: Double Tap makes up for a lack of fresh brains with an enjoyable reunion that recaptures the spirit of the original and adds a few fun twists." On Metacritic, the film has a weighted average score of 56 out of 100, based on 37 critics, indicating "mixed or average reviews". Audiences polled by CinemaScore gave the film an average grade of "B+" on an A+ to F scale, down from the "A−" received by the first film, while those surveyed at PostTrak gave it four out of five stars and a 64% "definite recommend".

Richard Roeper of the Chicago Sun-Times praised the performances, saying "They're all terrific, but Emma Stone in particular kills with a sharply honed, funny and endearing performance as the battle-tested and cynical Wichita, who is fearless when it comes to taking on zombies, but terrified when it comes to fully committing to a human connection." Simon Thompson at IGN also praises the acting, writing, "Zombieland: Double Tap is a riot, and a lot of that is due to Zoey Deutch and her character, Madison. While it doesn't quite achieve classic status in its own right, when it comes to sequels that do the original film justice, it is up there. It's worth the wait, your time and your money."

Kate Erbland of IndieWire gave the film a "C+", saying, "Zombieland: Double Tap still finds space for big laughs (the pairing of Eisenberg and Harrelson remains nutty and fun), a welcome cameo in the credits, and a banger of a final battle in which the body count soars to ridiculous numbers. But, after 10 years of anticipation, it would have been nice to see a zombie movie with more on its mind than the same goofy undead routine." Peter Debruge of Variety wrote, "The zombies have evolved[...] the comedy not so much," and, "Here, humor turns every kill into a sick punchline, and while the writers do a fine job of making them funny, like macabre cartoons in which Wile E. Coyote can rebound from unthinkable injuries, the movie's tone negates a fundamental respect for human life. Yeah, yeah, it's just a movie, you say. But like the first-person-shooter video games the film's Double Tap title references, society can't just passively sit back and accept an attitude that mocks pacifism and makes light of such extreme violence. Or else we're the zombies, and the joke's on us."

Rotten Tomatoes lists the film on its 100 Best Zombie Movies, Ranked by Tomatometer.

== Other media ==
=== Video games ===
A mobile game, titled Zombieland: Double Tapper, was released along with the film, featuring the characters.

The film also inspired a twin-stick shooter video game titled Zombieland: Double Tap – Road Trip. Developed by High Voltage Software and published by GameMill Entertainment and Maximum Games in North America and Europe respectively, it was released on October 15, 2019, for Microsoft Windows, Nintendo Switch, PlayStation 4, and Xbox One, three days before the film's US release.

On Metacritic, the PlayStation 4 version of Zombieland: Double Tap – Road Trip received a score of 39% based on 5 reviews, indicating "generally unfavorable" reviews.

=== Halloween Horror Nights ===
Zombieland: Double Tap was featured as a scare zone at Universal Studios Florida's Halloween Horror Nights. The zone included the modified presidential limousine "Beast" as seen in the film.

== Future ==
During the press tour for the film, the director, writers, and cast have all stated an interest in reuniting every ten years to do a Zombieland film. Director Ruben Fleischer said, "I think we all had so much fun making this one, we'd be really lucky if we could return to Zombieland. Although, I will say, Emma Stone said she thought it would be fun if we did one of these every 10 years. Knowing that Woody Harrelson's just the healthiest guy there is, he's going to outlive all of us, and so we can just keep doing them every 10 years, 'til the end of time.… I can't imagine a better way to look forward to my future than knowing that every 10 years I get to hang out with those guys and make a movie with them again."

In another interview, Fleischer said, "I would love to do a Madison stand-alone movie."

In 2025, Fleischer expressed hope that a third film could be done in 2029.
