= Livin' the Dream =

- The Office episode
- Episode no.: Season 9 Episode 21
- Directed by: Jeffrey Blitz
- Written by: Niki Schwartz-Wright
- Cinematography by: Sarah Levy
- Editing by: Claire Scanlon; Rob Burnett
- Production code: 9021
- Original air date: May 2, 2013
- Running time: 41 minutes

Guest appearances
- Andy Buckley as David Wallace; Michael Imperioli as Sensei Billy; Nora Kirkpatrick as Esther Bruegger

Episode chronology
← Previous "Paper Airplane"	Next → "A.A.R.M."
- The Office (American season 9)

"Livin' the Dream" is the twenty-first episode of the ninth season of the American comedy television series The Office and the 197th episode overall. It originally aired on NBC on May 2, 2013. The episode guest stars Michael Imperioli as Sensei Billy, and was initially scheduled to air in its half-hour timeslot, before being expanded to a full hour.

The series—presented as if it were a real documentary—depicts the everyday lives of office employees in the Scranton, Pennsylvania, branch of the fictional Dunder Mifflin Paper Company. In the episode, Andy Bernard (Ed Helms) decides to pursue a career as a professional actor, and quits his job at Dunder Mifflin. Meanwhile, Dwight Schrute (Rainn Wilson) finally receives his black belt in karate from his new sensei (Imperioli) and, on the recommendation of Jim Halpert (John Krasinski), is promoted to Regional Manager of the Scranton branch. Jim reconnects with Pam Halpert (Jenna Fischer), and makes it clear that he will choose her over Philadelphia.

The episode received a 1.8/5 percent share among adults between the ages of 18 and 49, ranking third in its first half-hour timeslot and fourth in its second, marking a slight increase in the ratings from the previous episode. "Livin' the Dream" received mostly positive reviews from television critics. Critical praise mainly went towards the dynamic between Jim, Pam and Dwight, particularly for the former two's reconciliation and the latter's promotion. Andy's subplot, meanwhile, received more mixed reviews.

== Synopsis ==
CEO David Wallace plans to fire Andy Bernard due to his missing work for acting gigs. However, Andy tells David he is resigning to pursue his dreams of stardom full-time, and David is relieved to not have to dismiss him. Dwight Schrute finally receives his black belt in karate from his new sensei, Billy. Seeing Dwight's tenacity and devotion, David is inspired to make Dwight Andy's replacement.

Jim Halpert has returned to Scranton full-time, saying he has realized that he cannot devote himself to both his family and his new job, and has decided to go "all in" on his family since that is what makes him most happy. David asks Jim his opinion on promoting Dwight, and Jim says that, despite Dwight's various eccentricities, he deserves the job and will be a great manager. David then officially offers the job to Dwight, who is elated that he has accomplished his dream; proudly exclaiming the news to the office. He appoints Jim the new assistant to the regional manager. Darryl Philbin informs Jim that Athlead has found a buyer and wants them to do a promotional tour around the country for three months. With undisguised regret, Jim says he will not do the tour because he cannot put his wife Pam through that, unaware that Pam is listening in.

Everyone in the office tells Andy that quitting is a foolish move and he has no chance of achieving stardom. Andy eventually goes back on his decision, and David allows him to stay on in a sales position. However, mere hours later Andy feels that he is sticking with his Dunder-Mifflin job only because it is safe and that he has to take a shot at achieving fame. Fearing his conviction will falter a second time, he decides he cannot simply quit, but get fired. To do this, he initially tells Toby to enter falsified and incriminating information in his record. After this fails, he attempts to grope Toby. Andy eventually resorts to shouting obscenities at David and defecating on his car, which is successful at getting him fired. Andy bids farewell to his coworkers with an unexpectedly moving rendition of "I Will Remember You", prompting them to comment to the documentary crew that he may have star potential after all.

Angela Martin has gotten divorced, and is evicted from her studio apartment after her cats were taken away by Animal Control. She considers living in a tent in the woods, prompting Oscar Martinez to offer her to stay with him until she gets back on her feet. She accepts with gratitude. As they set off to take Angela's things to Oscar's place, Oscar mentions her marriage to Robert Lipton and she breaks down into tears, saying "I love him." However, she denies she still has feelings for Robert and confesses she was talking about Dwight, and Oscar comforts her as she cries.

== Production ==
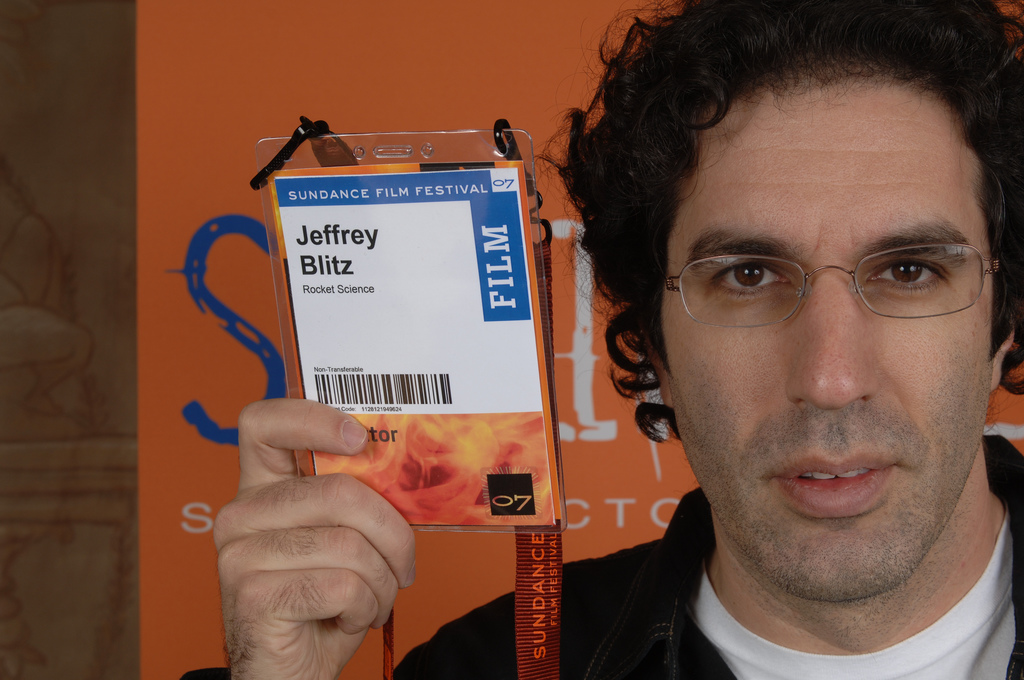
Jeffrey Blitz directed "Livin' the Dream".

"Livin' the Dream" was written by story editor Niki Schwartz-Wright, marking her second writing credit for the series, after the earlier season episode "Lice". It was directed by regular Office director Jeffrey Blitz, who last directed season eight's "Gettysburg". The episode was originally scheduled to air in its regular half-hour time slot, but NBC later announced it would be expanded to fill an hour time slot beginning a half hour early, although it still counts as one official episode, similar to the earlier season episode "Moving On". Rogers noted that "we knew the last two episodes would be hour-longs, and The Finale might even end up running longer, but we still had a lot of great storytelling to do leading up to them, and 'Livin' the Dream' was one that ultimately deserved to be an hour long episode as well!"

== Reception ==
=== Ratings ===
"Livin' the Dream" originally aired on May 2, 2013 on NBC. In its original American broadcast, "Livin' the Dream" was viewed by an estimated 3.51 million viewers and received a 1.8 rating/5% share among adults between the ages of 18 and 49. This means that it was seen by 1.8 percent of all 18- to 49-year-olds, and 5 percent of all 18- to 49-year-olds watching television at the time of the broadcast. This marked a slight increase in the ratings from the previous episode, "Paper Airplane". The episode ranked third in its first half-hour timeslot, being beaten by an episode of the CBS comedy series Two and a Half Men which received a 3.2/10 rating and an entry of the Fox reality series American Idol which scored a 2.6/9 rating. The second half-hour ranked fourth in its timeslot, being beaten by an episode of the ABC series Grey's Anatomy which scored a 3.0/9 rating, an entry of the CBS series Person of Interest which garnered a 2.4/7 rating, and installment of the Fox series Glee which received a 1.9/5 rating.

=== Reviews ===
"Livin' the Dream" received positive reviews from television critics. Roth Cornet of IGN wrote that "it pleases me greatly that at the conclusion of this super-sized episode I was left, once again, truly looking forward to seeing what these next few weeks, and that final hour of The Office, will bring." Cornet praised the full-use of the ensemble, particularly the "Phyllis and Stanley Lil' Romeo mini-debate" and Creed's confused mimicking of Dwight's declaration. Cornet also called the Dwight storyline "perfectly executed", as well as the Jim-Pam-Dwight dynamic featured throughout the episode, calling their companionship to be "entirely earned". She also praised Kinsey's performance during her character's storyline, and said her final scenes with Oscar "[tugged] at my heart-string". She gave the episode an 8.5 out of 10, calling it "Great". M. Giant of Television Without Pity awarded the episode an "A−" and wrote that "almost everybody is having their best day in a long time, in the best episode of The Office in an even longer time".

Nick Campbell of TV.com complimented the sentimental storylines in the episode, specifically between Jim, Pam and Dwight. He was positive towards Jim and Pam's reconciliation, but felt "something hollow about their reunion". He also noted that the Jim-Pam storyline caused the Dwight-Angela relationship to go "darker". Alan Sepinwall of HitFix gave the episode a slightly more mixed review, writing that "the non-Andy parts of "Livin' the Dream" were fairly interesting". He appreciated the drama coming from Angela's desperation, despite disagreeing with the logic in the situation. Sepinwall praised the Jim-Dwight dynamic in the episode, considering it an enjoyable payoff, and also praised Jim and Pam's reconciliation, particularly them annoying their co-workers with their flirting. Joshua Alton of The A.V. Club was more negative towards the episode, saying it felt "padded-out" to fill the full hour timeslot, and that "this episode might be the nadir for the show's hour-long installments". He was complimentary towards the Jim-Pam storyline, but felt "there wasn't much happening" beyond Pam overhearing Jim's talk with Darryl. Alton praised the Dwight storyline and his dynamic with Jim and Pam, calling it "the true fan service". Alton gave the episode a "C−".
