= Couples Discount =

- The Office episode
- Episode no.: Season 9 Episode 15
- Directed by: Troy Miller
- Written by: Allison Silverman
- Cinematography by: Matt Sohn
- Editing by: David Rogers; Curtis Thurber
- Production code: 9016
- Original air date: February 7, 2013
- Running time: 22 minutes

Guest appearances
- Melora Hardin as Jan Levinson (voice); Andy Buckley as David Wallace; Chris Diamantopoulos as Brian; Amy Hill as Nail Salon Manager

Episode chronology
← Previous "Vandalism"	Next → "Moving On"
- The Office (American season 9)

"Couples Discount" is the fifteenth episode of the ninth season of the American comedy television series The Office and the 191st episode overall. It originally aired on NBC on February 7, 2013. The episode features return guest appearances from Melora Hardin, Andy Buckley, and Chris Diamantopoulos.

The series—presented as if it were a real documentary—depicts the everyday lives of office employees in the Scranton, Pennsylvania, branch of the fictional Dunder Mifflin Paper Company. In the episode, the office pairs into couples so that they may all be able to take advantage of a Valentine's Day discount at a mini-mall. After Andy Bernard (Ed Helms) returns from his boat trip, Erin Hannon (Ellie Kemper) decides that she is going to break up with him so that she can be with Pete Miller (Jake Lacy), but Pete begins to doubt her. Meanwhile, Pam Halpert (Jenna Fischer) and Jim Halpert (John Krasinski) share lunch with Brian (Chris Diamantopoulos).

"Couples Discount" marked the final appearance for Melora Hardin (Jan Levinson). The episode received mixed reviews from television critics and was viewed by 4.15 million viewers and received 2.1/6% share among adults between the ages of 18 and 49. The episode ultimately ranked fourth in its timeslot. Despite this, The Office ranked as the highest-rated NBC series of the night.

== Synopsis ==
The office pairs into couples so they may all be able to take advantage of a Valentine's Day discount at a nail salon in a local mini-mall and enjoy one last boss-free day before Andy Bernard returns from his three-month boating sojourn. Erin Hannon decides that she is going to break up with Andy so she can be with Pete Miller, but he begins to doubt her because she goes to inordinate lengths to make their last day without Andy a happy one. At the salon, Darryl is uneasy about posing as part of a same-sex couple with Oscar, while Nellie does pose as part of a couple with Clark but is so rude to him that he tells the staff that they're not together and Nellie was lying to get the discount; Nellie sourly tells the camera crew she can't even make a fake relationship work.

Andy surprises everyone by showing up a day early and proceeds to alienate the entire office through a series of selfish and arrogant actions: he arrives at work without having washed or shaved since he left, he wrecks Dwight Schrute's record-setting sale with the Scranton White Pages while trying to reassert his authority as boss (in a later episode, Andy confesses that he intentionally ruined the sale out of spite), shows no shame at accepting all of his absentee paychecks and a "merit bonus" because the branch exceeded their quarterly sales goal while he was gone, and holds a meeting to get up to speed on recent events so he can bluff his way through a meeting with CEO David Wallace, who has no idea that Andy was gone at all. The employees decide not to tell David about Andy's unapproved absence, but at the meeting they cannot resist crafting made-up recent events in the hope that he will blow his own cover. However, when David meets with Andy he is almost completely oblivious to Andy's erroneous statements, and Andy is able to bluff his way through the meeting. He later expresses low-key anger with the staff over their attempt to sabotage him, and they respond by treating him with silent contempt.

Pam and Jim Halpert share lunch with Brian to thank him for protecting her from Frank. They are expecting his wife Alyssa to join him, but Brian reveals they are getting a divorce after having been fighting for a while. In an awkward attempt to lighten the mood, Brian makes a joke referencing how he consoled Pam when she broke down after her fight with Jim over the phone in "Customer Loyalty". After the lunch Jim admits, with some prodding, that he is angry that Pam did not tell him about this incident. Pam explains that she had not wanted to add to his worries, which only makes Jim angrier, but he brushes the matter off to avoid an argument. The couple had planned on sharing an evening bottle of wine for Valentine's Day, but Jim later tells Pam he wants to go down to Philadelphia instead because he fears they would only end up fighting on Valentine’s Day. Pam initially accepts this, but realizing that the silence between them is even worse than fighting, she tells Jim he should stay and fight with her, and Jim agrees.

At the end of the day, Erin tries to break up with Andy, saying she no longer loves him and is angry that he left and barely communicated with her. Andy vehemently protests the breakup and says their relationship can work out if she just pretends to still love him, using the example of his own parents (oblivious to the horrible end of their marriage). Erin walks outside to Pete, saying she could not do it. Pete tells her he is okay with this, since all he wants is for her to be happy. Emboldened by his selfless response, she kisses him, runs back up to Andy's office, and breaks up with him, also asserting the fact that she thought he had died. In her brief breakup speech she repeats her complaints about his three-month absence, not realizing that he is talking to David on speakerphone. Andy looks horrified as David says "What was that about three months?"

== Production ==
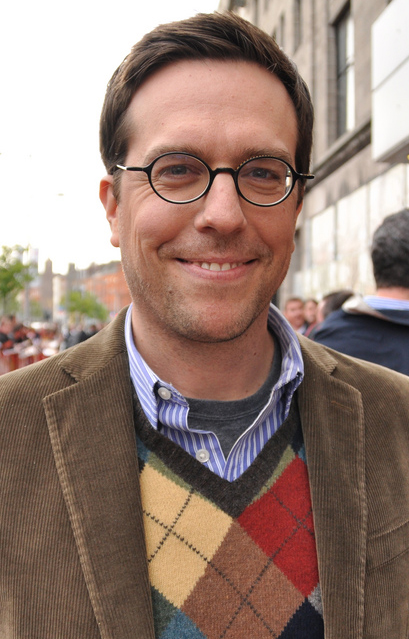
The episode marks the return of series regular Ed Helms, after departing the series for several episodes.

"Couples Discount" was written by co-executive producer Allison Silverman, marking her second writing credit for the season after "Roy's Wedding". It was directed by Troy Miller, his third directorial credit for the series. Originally, it was reported that the episode would be titled "Andy's Return". However, it was later renamed to "Couples Discount". The episode features the return of series regular Ed Helms, who had left for several episodes to film The Hangover Part III. His character was written out for eight episodes, leaving the office on a boat trip to the Bahamas for three months with his brother Walter.

== Broadcast and reception ==
=== Ratings ===
"Couples Discount" originally aired on NBC on February 7, 2013. In its original American broadcast, the episode was viewed by an estimated 4.15 million viewers and received a 2.1 rating/6% share. This means that it was seen by 2.1 percent of all 18- to 49-year-olds, and 6 percent of all 18- to 49-year-olds watching television at the time of the broadcast. This marked a slight increase in the ratings from the previous episode, "Vandalism". The Office ranked fourth in its timeslot, being beaten by an episode of the ABC series Grey's Anatomy and the CBS police procedural Person of Interest, both of which received a 3.1/8 percent rating, and an installment of the Fox series Glee that received a 2.2/6 percent rating.

=== Reviews ===
"Couples Discount" received mixed reviews. The A.V. Club reviewer Erik Adams complimented the transformation of Andy into a villain, calling it "intriguing" and "curious", although he said the characterization would not "stick" to the character for the following episodes. Adams gave more praise to the subplots, particularly Jim and Pam's storyline, calling it a "refreshingly honest take on the vagaries of marriage" and compared their decision to fight at home to the early "Pam-and-Jim charm". Adams gave the episode a B−. TV.com columnist Nick Campbell complimented the choice of using Andy as a villain, for further developing the Erin-Pete relationship, which he called "one of two satisfying events in this episode". He also praised the Jim and Pam storyline and the writers for focusing on their relationship, rather than Brian, writing that their final scene was "almost sweet, how nervous they were about heading into the Thunderdome". He criticized the plot inconsistency and the nail salon plot for feeling "jammed in" and for using predictable jokes. Campbell ultimately called it a "satisfying episode".

IGN's Roth Cornet was more critical towards Andy's return, writing that it serves as further example of the writers treating him as a plot device, rather than a character. Cornet continued that the episode featured "some fairly compelling drama, as well as some of the more cohesive moments of the season, character-wise", but "very little comedy". Cornet complimented the turn in the Jim-Pam-Brian storyline, and for the writers using Brian as a catalyst for a "real conversation between Pam and Jim", instead of a love triangle between the three. She also went on to praise their final scene, for showcasing "what The Office has created with these two characters – a human, and real relationship." Cornet gave the episode a 6.9, considering it an "okay" episode.
