= The Farm (The Office) =

- The Office episode
- Episode no.: Season 9 Episode 17
- Directed by: Paul Lieberstein
- Written by: Paul Lieberstein
- Cinematography by: Matt Sohn
- Editing by: Rob Burnett; David Rogers; Claire Scanlon
- Production code: 9005
- Original air date: March 14, 2013
- Running time: 22 minutes

Guest appearances
- Majandra Delfino as Fannie Schrute; Matt Jones as Ziek Schrute; Thomas Middleditch as Jeb Schrute; Blake Garrett Rosenthal as Cameron Whitman; David Koechner as Todd Packer; Allan Havey as Henry Bruegger; Nora Kirkpatrick as Esther Bruegger; Mary Gillis as Shirley; Michael Schur as Mose Schrute

Episode chronology
← Previous "Moving On"	Next → "Promos"
- The Office (American season 9)

"The Farm" is the seventeenth episode of the ninth season of the American comedy television series The Office and the 193rd overall. It originally aired on NBC on March 14, 2013. The episode guest stars Majandra Delfino, Matt Jones, Thomas Middleditch, Blake Garrett Rosenthal, David Koechner, Allan Havey, Nora Kirkpatrick, Mary Gillis, and Michael Schur.

The series—presented as if it were a real documentary—depicts the everyday lives of office employees in the Scranton, Pennsylvania, branch of the fictional Dunder Mifflin Paper Company. The episode revolves around Dwight Schrute (Rainn Wilson) attending the funeral of his Aunt Shirley at Schrute Farms, where his family reunites. Meanwhile, Todd Packer (David Koechner) returns to the office claiming to be a reformed man.

"The Farm" was produced to serve as a backdoor pilot for a proposed spin-off series starring Wilson as Dwight, which NBC ultimately did not pick up. The episode received mostly negative reviews from television critics, with many criticizing Dwight's farm storyline and some critics calling it a "Frankenstein episode". The episode was viewed by 3.54 million viewers and received a 1.9/5 rating among adults between the ages of 18 and 49. The episode ranked fourth in its timeslot, and it was the highest-rated NBC series of the night.

== Plot ==
Dwight Schrute informs the office that his Aunt Shirley has died. The only co-worker he invites to the funeral is Oscar Martinez, who flees when Dwight begins shooting the corpse with a shotgun to ensure it is really dead. At the funeral, Dwight's family gathers: his cousins Mose and Zeke, his brother Jeb, his sister Fannie, his nephew Cammy, and his uncle Heinrich. The family learns that Aunt Shirley has willed the siblings her estate on the condition that they all come back home to run it. Though Jeb and Fannie do not share Dwight's enthusiasm for country life, Dwight manages to convince them to move back to Scranton and help him run the farm, thereby inheriting it.

Meanwhile, Todd Packer visits the office and announces that he wants to make amends for his past behavior. He makes rude remarks masked as apologies and hands out store-bought cupcakes. Pam Halpert argues that they should not eat the cupcakes to spite Packer. She remains adamant on this point even after Packer leaves, but the remaining employees eat their cupcakes. Packer reveals to the documentary crew that he spiked the cupcakes with drugs in retaliation for his firing. He then visits Jim Halpert and Darryl Philbin at Athlead in Philadelphia, pulling the same trick on them. In the morning, Pam returns to the office and announces she is going to eat her cupcake, only to find everyone else reeling from the aftereffects of Packer's deed.

== Production ==
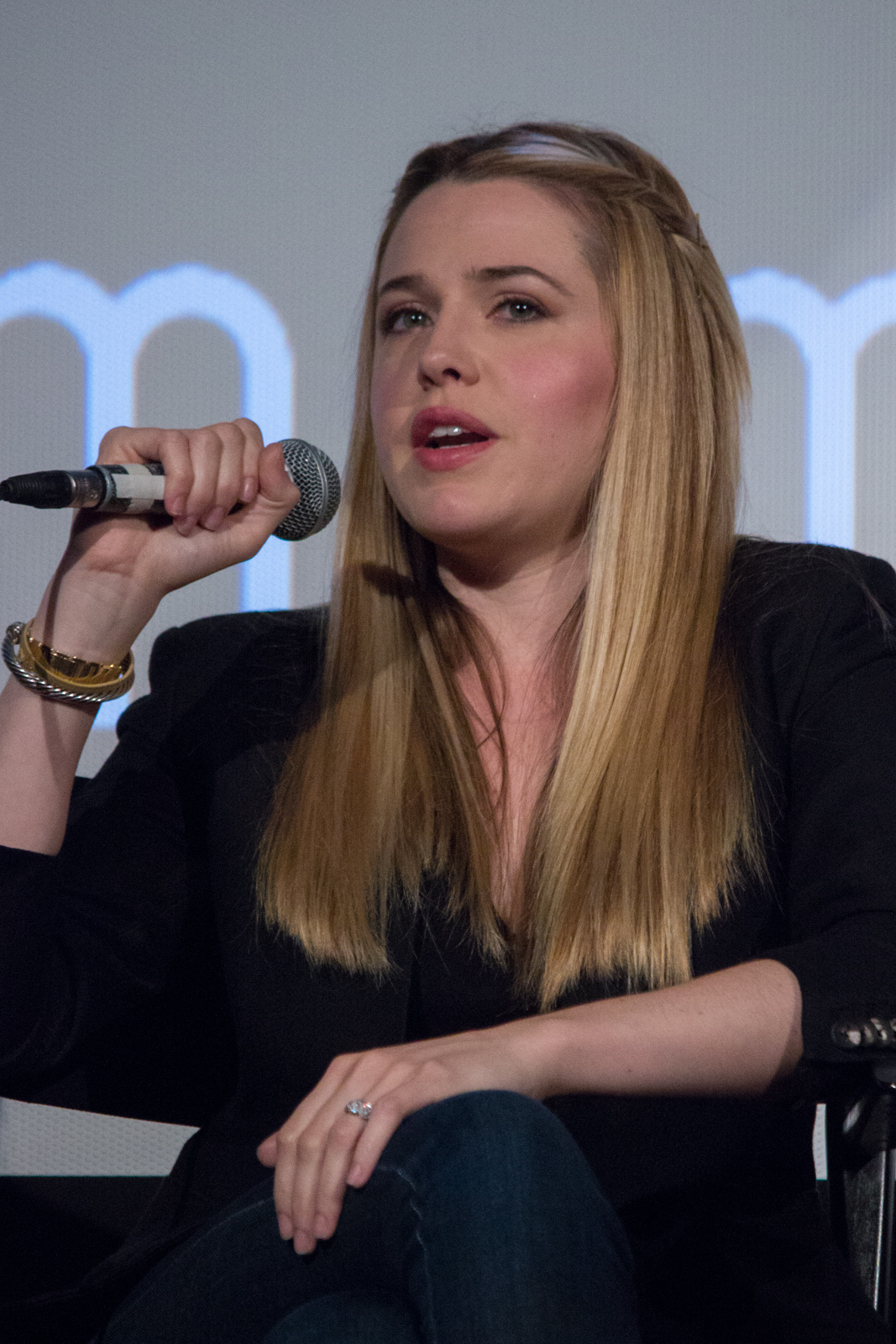
Majandra Delfino guest-starred as Dwight's sister.

The episode was written and directed by executive producer and former showrunner Paul Lieberstein, marking his thirteenth writing credit, sixth directorial credit and fourth dual credit. "The Farm" was the fifth episode produced, but was the seventeenth aired, as noted by its production number. It was originally supposed to act as a backdoor pilot for a spin-off series, also called The Farm starring Wilson and focusing on Dwight. As such, Wilson was initially slated to appear in only 13 episodes of The Office's ninth season before leaving for the spin-off. Paul Lieberstein, the showrunner for The Office for seasons five through eight, stepped down at the start of season nine in order to focus more energy on the potential spin-off. However, upon review, the spin-off was not picked up by NBC. Executive producer Greg Daniels revealed that the episode would have additional material shot so that it fits better into the season, as the original version contained "certain aspects that were appropriate for a pilot of a new show".

The episode guest stars Majandra Delfino, Blake Garrett Rosenthal, Thomas Middleditch and Matt Jones as members of Dwight's family, who were intended to form the main cast of The Farm with Wilson; Delfino plays Dwight's sister Fannie, Rosenthal plays Dwight's nephew Cammy, Middleditch portrays Dwight's brother Jeb, and Jones portrays Dwight's cousin Zeke. Tom Bower appears as Dwight's great uncle Heinrich in a deleted scene only, although he retains his credit in the broadcast episode. Jones had previously appeared in the ninth season entry, "Junior Salesman".

== Broadcast and reception ==
=== Ratings ===
"The Farm" originally aired on NBC on March 14, 2013, after a four-week hiatus. In its original American broadcast, the episode was viewed by an estimated 3.54 million viewers and received a 1.9 rating/5 percent share. This means that it was seen by 1.9 percent of all 18- to 49-year-olds, and 5 percent of all 18- to 49-year-olds watching television at the time of the broadcast. This marked a decrease in the ratings from the previous episode, "Moving On". The Office ranked fourth in its timeslot, being beaten by an episode of the CBS police procedural Person of Interest which received a 2.9/8 percent rating, an entry of the ABC series Grey's Anatomy which received a 2.6/7 percent rating, and an installment of the Fox series Glee which received a 2.0/6 percent rating. Despite this, the episode was the highest-rated NBC series for the night. 1.90 million viewers watched the episode via DVR playback, bringing the total viewership to 5.36 million viewers and a 3.0 18–49 rating.

=== Reviews ===
"Then there was the open-endedness of Dwight walking onto the farm with his brother and sister, the beginning of the new life. The tone didn't match. None of this was necessarily bad on its own, but because we know what we know, it came off less like a weird outing for Dwight and revealed the stitching of people trying to patch in a standalone episode... which by mere approach made it feel larger and grander, the seams of the monster."

— Nick Campbell, TV.com

"The Farm" received mostly negative reviews from critics, many criticizing Dwight's farm storyline and some critics calling it a "Frankenstein episode". M. Giant of Television Without Pity awarded the episode a C. Alan Sepinwall of HitFix considered NBC's decision not to pick up the spin-off for more episodes the right decision, writing that the characters and scenes were "barely sketches" and featured too much "cartoonishness". Sepinwall also criticized the Todd Packer scenes, and only saw Dwight's interactions with his nephew, Cammy, in a positive light. TV.com columnist Nick Campbell called the farm storyline "unnatural" compared to the episode and the series, as a whole, and wrote that the tone to the ending "didn't match". Despite this, he complimented the storyline for "establishing tone, characters, and direction in literally half the time usually allotted". The A.V. Club reviewer Erik Adams complimented the episode for serving as a "breather" from the season's long arcs, and gave good background information into Dwight's personality. He went on to criticize the pilot's broad humor, writing that following the scene featuring Dwight shooting a shotgun into his aunt's casket, "it would be next to impossible for The Farm to heighten from that point". Adams graded the episode a B. Damon Houx of ScreenCrush called the two storylines "two pieces of that [sic] didn't work all that well together", which all added to a "dull" episode. Houx complimented Koechner's performance, calling him a "great improviser" but wrote that the whole plot was lacking. He also considered the farm plotline to be pointless and aimless, especially due to it airing in the last few episodes of the series.
