= Paper Airplane (The Office) =

- The Office episode
- Episode no.: Season 9 Episode 20
- Directed by: Jesse Peretz
- Written by: Halsted Sullivan; Warren Lieberstein
- Cinematography by: Matt Sohn
- Editing by: David Rogers; Curtis Thurber
- Production code: 9020
- Original air date: April 25, 2013
- Running time: 22 minutes

Guest appearances
- Roseanne Barr as Carla Fern; Nora Kirkpatrick as Esther Bruegger; Mark Proksch as Nate Nickerson; Blake Robbins as Tom Halpert; Bobby Ray Shafer as Bob Vance

Episode chronology
← Previous "Stairmageddon"	Next → "Livin' the Dream"
- The Office (American season 9)

"Paper Airplane" is the twentieth episode of the ninth season of the American comedy television series The Office. It originally aired on NBC on April 25, 2013. The episode features guest stars Roseanne Barr, Nora Kirkpatrick, Mark Proksch, Blake Robbins, and Bobby Ray Shafer. It was also the final half-hour episode of the series, being the fourth-to-last episode aired.

The series—presented as if it were a real documentary—depicts the everyday lives of office employees in the Scranton, Pennsylvania, branch of the fictional Dunder Mifflin Paper Company. In the episode, the office staff compete against each other in a paper airplane contest. Meanwhile, Andy Bernard (Ed Helms) prepares for a potential acting job, and Jim (John Krasinski) and Pam Halpert (Jenna Fischer) utilize new skills that they learned in couples' counseling.

The episode received mostly mixed reviews from critics; some felt that the episode was humorous, whereas others were critical of the main plot involving Pam and Jim. The episode was viewed by 3.25 million viewers and received a 1.7/5 rating among adults between the ages of 18 and 49, giving it the lowest viewership rating of any episode of The Office. "Paper Airplane" ranked fourth in its timeslot, but was nevertheless the highest-rated NBC series of the night.

== Synopsis ==
A paper airplane contest is being hosted at Dunder Mifflin by a new paper supplier. All of the office workers compete against each other for a $2,000 prize. Erin Hannon in particular is fiercely competitive, and even as she realizes that she is showing an ugly side of herself to her boyfriend Pete Miller, she cannot hold back from smashing a box of packing peanuts when she loses in the semi-finals. After several intense rounds, it comes down to Dwight Schrute and Angela Lipton. Dwight, who is dating Esther, tries to throw the contest. Angela is flattered by the gesture. However, when Esther expresses her condolences to Angela about her financial situation since her husband separated from her, she realizes that Dwight is letting her win out of pity, not love. Angered, she rebuffs Dwight's pity and lets him win the contest.

Andy Bernard prepares for an acting job in a laboratory safety video that was arranged by his talent agent, Carla Fern. The directors continuously have to talk him out of overacting, and he backs down from shooting a scene using an eye wash, since he has an aversion towards anything being shot into his eye. However, Carla threatens to have him blacklisted if he does not go through with the scene. Darryl Philbin, who came along as friendly support, gives Andy the confidence to shoot the scene, and in the end Andy even insists on doing two takes, impressing Carla.

In couples' counseling, Jim and Pam Halpert have been told to express appreciation for the things their spouse does for them, be frank about things that make them unhappy, and refer to anything they do not want to do but must as “an opportunity”. Their exercising of these three habits is stiff and formal to begin with, and becomes increasingly snarky as the day goes on. Despite this, as Jim leaves the office to return to his business, he confesses to Pam that he thinks the three habits are helping and that they should keep them up. After he leaves, Pam runs after him to give him an umbrella. Jim takes the umbrella, and then embraces his wife, who finds that she lacks the emotional conviction to hug him back. It then flashbacks to their wedding with their co-workers present, she remembers that by marrying Jim she promised to love him in spite of any hardships, and she lovingly embraces him and kisses him.

== Production ==
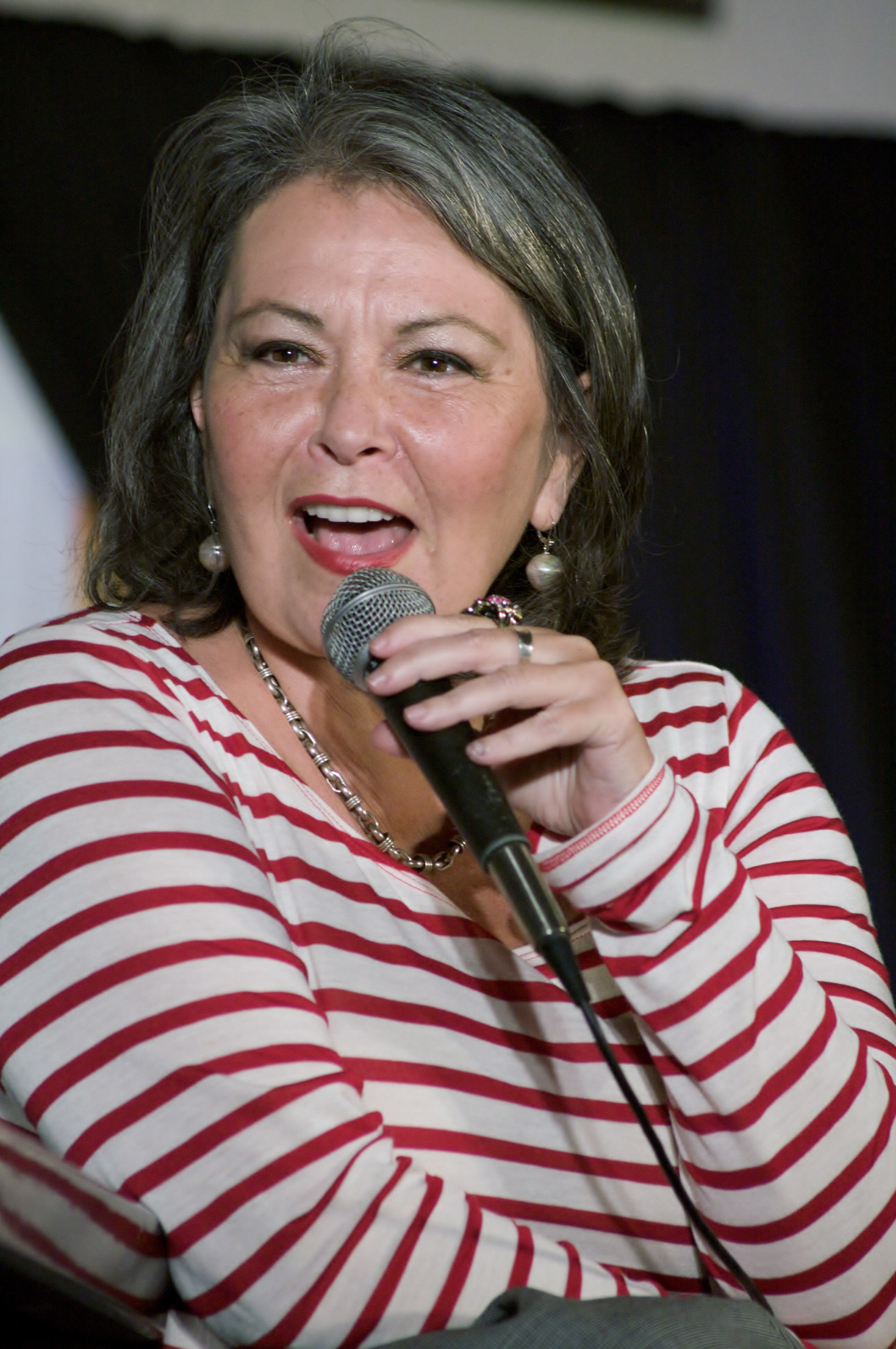
The episode was the second to guest star Roseanne Barr as talent agent Carla Fern.

"Paper Airplane" was written by co-executive producers Halsted Sullivan and Warren Lieberstein, marking their first writing credit for the season, as well as their first writing credit since season eight's "Turf War". It was directed by first-time Office director, Jesse Peretz. Comedian Roseanne Barr guest stars in this episode. It was announced on January 31, 2013 that she would be doing a two episode arc and would play a talent agent named Carla Fern. Barr began filming her scenes the week following January 31. She first appeared in the previous episode, "Stairmageddon".

The episode features both archival footage—as well as new footage—of Pam and Jim's wedding from the sixth-season episode "Niagara". In order to get a shot of Pam and Jim looking into the camera, Greg Daniels restaged the scene four years after "Niagara" had been filmed. Daniels noted, "To get Jim and Pam's eye line right for the camera, I stepped in as the minister [when the camera was facing them] so they were both looking at me with the full actor-power of all the emotions they were supposed to be feeling at their own wedding, just blasting in my face. I got chills and a fever."

== Cultural references ==
Dwight refers to the new paper as the "Cadillac of paper". Andy notes that if he is successful in his industrial film, he could potentially land a role in the movie Moneyballs 2, a sequel to the 2011 film Moneyball starring Brad Pitt. When told to act like he is doing a newscast, Andy does a Tom Brokaw impersonation. Andy also says that if necessary he will go all-nude for the role in a "full-on Lena Dunham", a reference to her skit at the 64th Primetime Emmy Awards. Darryl tells Andy that he was in a production of The Wiz in high school. Kevin mistakes Orville and Wilbur Wright—the credited inventors of the airplane—for "Wilbur and Orville Redenbacher"—a brand of popcorn. In the last scene, when Jim and Pam resolve their differences, the cut-scene shows Jim's brother Tom reading 1 Corinthians 13:7–13 from the Bible.

== Reception ==
=== Ratings ===
"Paper Airplane" originally aired on April 25, 2013 on NBC. In its original American broadcast, the episode was viewed by an estimated 3.25 million viewers and received a 1.7 rating/5 percent share. At 3.25 million viewers, it is the lowest rated episode of the series to ever air. This means that it was seen by 1.7 percent of all 18- to 49-year-olds, and 5 percent of all 18- to 49-year-olds watching television at the time of the broadcast. This marked a decrease in the ratings from the previous episode, "Stairmageddon". The Office ranked fourth in its timeslot, being beaten by an episode of the ABC series Grey's Anatomy which scored a 2.7/7 rating, an entry of the CBS series Person of Interest which garnered a 2.4/7 rating, and installment of the Fox series Glee which received a 1.8/5 rating. When DVR numbers were included, the episode was watched by 4.956 million viewers and increased its ratings up 65 percent to a 2.8, meaning it was seen by, in total, 2.8 percent of all 18- to 49-year-olds.

=== Reviews ===
Roth Cornet of IGN awarded the episode an 8.5 out of 10, denoting a "great" episode. She praised the final scene, and said that Pam's decision was "a gorgeously simple emotional shift". She was complimentary towards the balance between characters and felt that "the rest of the episode was entertaining and well constructed, if not earth shatteringly hilarious." Dan Forcella of TV Fanatic awarded the episode four out of five stars, summarizing that "An otherwise funny episode of The Office, highlighted by Toby's awkwardness, Dwight's craziness and Kevin's pride, was held back by yet another trip down Pam and Jim's boring avenue of problems."

Nick Campbell of TV.com gave the episode a more moderate review, writing that "The Jam story was probably the only bright spot for me in an episode generally devoid of chuckles", and that it was "not a terrible episode, but basic and a little boring." He was complimentary towards the conclusion of the Jim-Pam plot, noting that the final scene was "a warm moment", although he was surprised by the scene's placement in the season as a whole. Alan Sepinwall of HitFix wrote positively of the finale scene, noting that "it really worked", and that Krasinski and Fischer were "terrific" during the sequence. However, he said that the "comedy parts of 'Paper Airplane' were so dire I'm not going to dwell on them at all".

Erik Adams of The A.V. Club awarded the episode a "C+" and felt that the finale scene, while set up to be emotional, was "hollow". He argued that the tension does not feel as threatening as it should; he compared it to the second season episode "Casino Night", which had invoked real fears about the future of Jim and Pam. He summed up: "I wish the final scene of 'Paper Airplane' made me feel something deeper." Adams also was not impressed with the Dwight-Angela storyline, but was "enjoying Andy's day on the industrial-safety film—much more so than anticipated" due to the "unintentional hilarity" that ensued.

Roseanne Barr's performance was later submitted by the producers of The Office for an "Outstanding Guest Actor in Comedy Series" Emmy consideration.
