= Junior Salesman =

- The Office episode
- Episode no.: Season 9 Episode 13
- Directed by: David Rogers
- Written by: Carrie Kemper
- Cinematography by: Matt Sohn
- Editing by: David Rogers
- Production code: 9014
- Original air date: January 31, 2013
- Running time: 22 minutes

Guest appearances
- Chris Diamantopoulos as Brian; Beth Grant as Melvina Whitaker; Chris Gethard as Trevor Bortmen; Matt L. Jones as Ziek Schrute; Lance Krall as Ira Glicksberg; Will McCormack as Wolf von Weyler; Mark Proksch as Nate Nickerson; Michael Schur as Mose Schrute; James Urbaniak as Rolf Ahl; Eric Wareheim as Gabor Csupczyk

Episode chronology
← Previous "Customer Loyalty"	Next → "Vandalism"
- The Office (American season 9)

"Junior Salesman" is the thirteenth episode of the ninth season of the American comedy television series The Office and the 189th episode overall. It originally aired on NBC on January 31, 2013. The episode was written by Carrie Kemper and directed by David Rogers. The episode features the return and introduction of several guest stars, including Chris Diamantopoulos, Beth Grant, Chris Gethard, Matt L. Jones, Lance Krall, Will McCormack, Mark Proksch, Michael Schur, James Urbaniak and Eric Wareheim.

The series—presented as if it were a real documentary—depicts the everyday lives of office employees in the Scranton, Pennsylvania, branch of the fictional Dunder Mifflin Paper Company. In the episode, Dunder Mifflin CEO David Wallace (Andy Buckley) tasks Dwight Schrute (Rainn Wilson) with finding a part-time replacement for Jim Halpert (John Krasinski), and Dwight must choose among Clark (Clark Duke) and several of his close friends, including his cousin Mose (Schur).

The episode received mixed reviews from television critics, however many considered it superior to "Vandalism", particularly for the lessened presence of Brian. "Junior Salesman" was viewed by 4.45 million viewers and received a 2.1/5 rating among adults between the ages of 18 and 49. Although The Office, ranked third in its timeslot, it ranked as the highest-rated NBC series of the night.

== Synopsis ==
Dunder Mifflin CEO David Wallace has tasked Dwight Schrute with finding a part-time replacement for Jim Halpert. Pam Halpert is concerned about this, as Jim's replacement will be her new "deskmate". Clark Green feels he is ready for the position, citing his key role in various sales, but Dwight wants someone who he can be sure will not team up with Pam against him. To that end, he brings in a bizarre gallery of his relatives and close friends, including his cousin Mose, best friend Rolf, part-time private investigator Trevor, former Corporate executive Troy Underbridge, and his karate teacher Sensei Ira. To Dwight's horror, though, none of his candidates are competent enough to even make it through the full job interview, much less be paper salesmen. Clark ends his interview after answering Dwight's complicated questions perfectly, pointing out that he has no choice but to hire him if he wants someone who can do the job.

Jim calls Wallace to pitch for the CEO to invest in Athlead. Dwight puts the conversation on speaker phone, allowing him to hear Wallace first tell Jim his salary is going to be cut to reflect his part-time status, and then bluntly shoot down the idea of investing in Athlead. Dwight, though praising his friends' outlandish delinquent behavior to the cameras, gradually comes to realize his professional integrity will not allow him to hire any of them, and sadly notes that he outgrew all of his friends in just three hours. Afraid they will hate him if he does not pick one of them, he asks Jim to pretend to take over the hiring decision and make the call to hire no one. Being willing to do anything to save Pam from being stuck with an unbearable deskmate, Jim agrees. However, when Jim announces the decision, Rolf immediately intuits that Dwight is using Jim as a scapegoat. Dwight's friends storm off to play paintball without him, later sending an e-mail with a photo of their paintball outing and the message "Glad you're not here" while giving Dwight the finger. Clark gets the salesman job. Pam is grateful to Jim for arranging this but says she still misses her "old deskmate" Jim. Pam briefly lifts Dwight's spirits by suggesting they "haze the new guy", though she makes Dwight stop that plan when he nearly suffocates Clark with shrink wrap. It is also hinted that Brian, the boom mike operator for the documentary crew, has developed a crush on Pam, paired with audio of Jim’s talking head, “Because of where my desk was, I spent all those years looking at Pam, and I fell in love.”

== Production ==
"Junior Salesman" was written by executive story editor Carrie Kemper, who is the younger sister of cast member Ellie Kemper, making it her fourth writing credit for the series, following the ninth-season entry, "The Whale". The episode was directed by series editor David Rogers, marking his eighth directing credit for the series, following the ninth season entry, "Andy's Ancestry". The episode features guest appearances from Matt L. Jones as Dwight's cousin, Zeke. Jones had initially been cast for a proposed Office spin-off centered on Dwight titled "The Farm". A backdoor pilot was filmed, but upon review, the spin-off was not picked up by NBC. The episode also features the first time appearance of Eric Wareheim as Gabor and Will McCormack as Wolf. In addition to new guest stars, the episode saw the return of several minor characters, including Lance Krall as Sensei Ira, Chris Gethard as Trevor, Noel Petok as Troy Underbridge, Beth Grant as Dwight's babysitter, Melvina, and James Urbaniak as Rolf.

The press release for the episode included, "Erin tries to find her birth parents with Pete's help", although this plotline was completely absent from the episode. David Rogers, who is also an editor on the series, said that storyline was cut because "we had so much great comedy and needed the time for Dwight and his freaky friends and how Jim and the gang reacted". Rogers also commented since they shoot in a documentary style, they can shoot faster than regular single-camera comedies, meaning their first cut of the episodes can be 15–21 minutes longer than the 22-minute air length, and several scenes need to be cut.

== Broadcast and reception ==
=== Ratings ===
"Junior Salesman" originally aired on NBC on January 31, 2013, alongside the following episode, "Vandalism". The hour-long timeslot for The Office followed the one-hour series finale of 30 Rock. In its original American broadcast, "Junior Salesman" was viewed by 4.45 million viewers and received a 2.1 rating/5 percent share among adults between the ages of 18 and 49, marking a slight rise in the ratings from the previous episode, "Customer Loyalty". This means that it was seen by 2.1 percent of all 18- to 49-year-olds, and 5 percent of all 18- to 49-year-olds watching television at the time of the broadcast. The Office ranked third in its timeslot, and was the highest-rated NBC series of the night, although the hour-long installment of 30 Rock received more viewers. 1.91 million viewers watched the episode through DVR playback, bringing the total viewership to 6.36 million.

=== Reviews ===
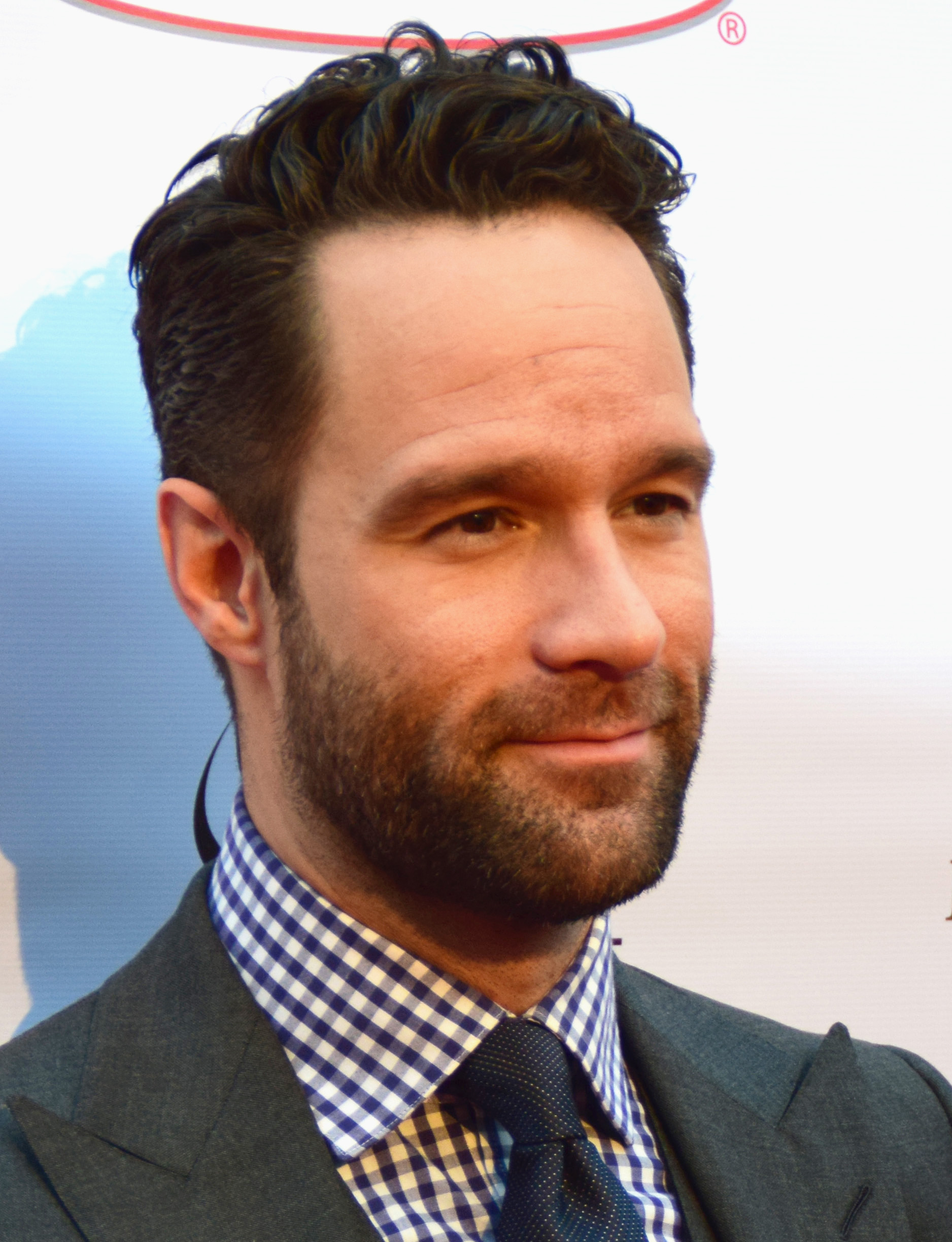
The presence of Chris Diamantopoulos throughout the episode was the main criticism from most critics.

The episode received mixed reviews from television critics. Michael Tedder of Vulture awarded the episode—along with "Vandalism"—four stars out of five. He called it "one of the silliest episodes in recent memory", and complimented the break from the dramatic ending of "Customer Loyalty". He also complimented the maturation of Dwight throughout the episode, calling this episode a "mile-marker" for his character. He considered it superior to the succeeding episode, "Vandalism". IGN writer Roth Cornet said the Dwight plotline yielded the "funniest and most disturbing moments of the night", but that the episode did not allow for much work to be given to the rest of the ensemble cast. Cornet also went on to criticize Brian's infatuation towards Pam and the potential "other-man" outcome for their storyline, stating that it would ultimately just be a "gimmick". She gave the episode a 7.5/10, calling it "Good". Bonnie Stiernberg of Paste considered the episode to be a build-up to the "gut-punch" scene between Brian and Pam in "Vandalism", considering the only other important plot from the episode to be the Dwight-Jim one. Stiernberg considered the Dwight-Jim subplot to be "moderately funny", but "predictably bizarre". She gave the episode a seven out of ten, along with "Vandalism".

Brett Davinger of The California Literary Review called Brian's antics "creepy", particularly his smile at the end of the episode. Despite this, Davinger complimented the episode for focusing on one single plot. Nick Campbell of TV.com wrote that "Junior Salesman"—along with "Vandalism"—was "so much sharper than last week's trial in Dullsville". Campbell also complimented the return of Michael Schur as Mose and the performances of Matt L. Jones and Brian Baumgartner. Multiple critics considered the episode superior to "Vandalism", particularly due to their displeasure with the Brian-Pam storyline, which was more prevalent in "Vandalism".
