= Stairmageddon =

- The Office episode
- Episode no.: Season 9 Episode 19
- Directed by: Matt Sohn
- Written by: Dan Sterling
- Cinematography by: Sarah Levy
- Editing by: Claire Scanlon
- Production code: 9019
- Original air date: April 11, 2013
- Running time: 22 minutes

Guest appearances
- Roseanne Barr as Carla Fern; Jack Coleman as Robert Lipton; Hugh Dane as Hank Tate; Paul Feig as a client

Episode chronology
← Previous "Promos"	Next → "Paper Airplane"
- The Office (American season 9)

"Stairmageddon" is the nineteenth episode of the ninth season of the American comedy television series The Office. It originally aired on NBC on April 11, 2013. The episode features guest appearances from Roseanne Barr as Andy's agent Carla Fern and Paul Feig as a man auditioning his act for Carla.

The series—presented as if it were a real documentary—depicts the everyday lives of office employees in the Scranton, Pennsylvania, branch of the fictional Dunder Mifflin Paper Company. In the episode, the office workers are forced to walk up the stairs while the elevator is being serviced. Dwight Schrute (Rainn Wilson) kidnaps Stanley Hudson (Leslie David Baker) to assist in an important sales call. Pam Halpert (Jenna Fischer) and Jim Halpert (John Krasinski) talk with Nellie Bertram (Catherine Tate) and Toby Flenderson (Paul Lieberstein) about marital troubles. Meanwhile, Angela Lipton (Angela Kinsey) supports her husband during a press conference.

"Stairmageddon" received mixed reviews from television critics. The episode was viewed by 3.84 million viewers and received a 1.9/5 percent among adults between the ages of 18 and 49. The episode ranked second in its timeslot and The Office was the highest-rated NBC series of the night.

== Synopsis ==
Everyone in the office grows anxious as the premiere of the PBS TV documentary The Office: An American Workplace draws near. Andy Bernard combines an unflattering appraisal of himself from an early newspaper review of the program and his blunt self-assessment that he is unlikely to remain employed at Dunder Mifflin for very long after it airs, and decides it is time to pursue his dreams of stardom. After many fruitless calls to dismissive talent agencies, he finds himself at the dual talent agency/real estate office run by Carla Fern. Carla agrees to represent Andy, who is thrilled that he only has to pay $5,000 for the privilege.

The office workers are forced to use the stairs while the elevator is being serviced, a situation everyone deems "Stairmageddon". The out-of-shape Stanley Hudson undergoes a painful struggle in climbing the stairs, only to be greeted at the top by Dwight Schrute ordering him to take part in an important sales call. Unwilling to climb the stairs a second time, Stanley refuses. Since the client is a friend of Stanley's sister, Dwight (who is operating without concern for niceties now that the documentary has driven home the point that he will never be the branch manager at Dunder Mifflin) cannot take no for an answer, so after getting Andy's permission to bring Stanley through "whatever means possible," he shoots Stanley with bull tranquilizers. With help from Clark Green, Dwight gets Stanley to the car, injuring him various times in the process. The tranquilizers inexplicably make Stanley intoxicated, and his unusually jolly mood helps them close the sale. When Stanley regains full awareness, he is pleased to learn that he made a sale with no effort whatsoever, but still refuses to take the stairs again. He instead knocks himself out with one of Dwight's darts, leaving Dwight and Clark to figure out how to get him back upstairs.

Jim Halpert talks with Toby Flenderson about his going to marriage counseling with Pam Halpert, and Pam does the same with Nellie Bertram. Toby tells Jim that it is not fair to tell Pam that he needs an indeterminate amount of time before Athlead pays off for the family; Pam vents to Nellie that Jim is always making unilateral decisions involving her and they each agree they are not leaving Philly for Scranton or vice versa. At the end of the day, Nellie and Toby both complain to each other about how exhausting Jim and Pam are, while the Halperts leave the office looking sad and awkward together.

Angela Lipton agrees to be the supportive "good wife" for her state senator husband Robert at a press conference in the aftermath of the documentary's reveal of his affair with Oscar Martinez. Angela assumes this means he intends to deny the affair and reassert his devotion to family values. Instead, Robert tells the press that he is gay and further humiliates Angela by insinuating that his relations with her drove him to homosexuality. Oscar is also dumbstruck when Robert, while openly proclaiming his affair with Oscar, says that he is in love with his chief of staff, Wesley Silver. Kevin Malone happily gloats to the office staff about his keeping Oscar's secret to the very end, and is immensely relieved that he doesn't have to keep it secret anymore.

== Production ==
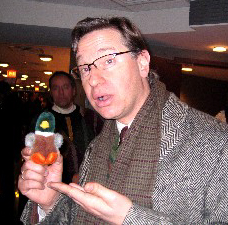
Paul Feig, director of fifteen episodes for the series, appeared in a cameo in "Stairmageddon".

"Stairmageddon" was written by executive producer Dan Sterling, his second writing credit for the series after the ninth season entry, "The Boat". It was directed by series cinematographer Matt Sohn, his eighth directorial effort for the series, following the ninth season entry, "Suit Warehouse". Comedian Roseanne Barr guest stars in this episode. It was announced on January 31, 2013, that she would be doing a two episode arc and would play a talent agent named Carla Fern. Barr began filming her scenes the week following January 31. Director Paul Feig also guest stars in the episode, his first time appearing in the series. He previously directed several episodes of the series, with his last entry being "Goodbye, Michael" in season seven.

== Reception ==
=== Ratings ===
"Stairmageddon" originally aired on April 11, 2013, on NBC. In its original American broadcast, the episode was viewed by an estimated 3.83 million viewers and received a 1.9 rating/5 percent share. This means that it was seen by 1.9 percent of all 18- to 49-year-olds, and 5 percent of all 18- to 49-year-olds watching television at the time of the broadcast. This marked a slight increase in the ratings from the previous episode, "Promos". The Office ranked second in its timeslot, being beaten by an installment of the Fox series Glee which received a 2.4/6 rating.

=== Reviews ===
"Stairmageddon" received mixed reviews from television critics, with praise going to the drama in the Jim-Pam storyline, while the zaniness of other storylines received more mixed opinions. The A.V. Club reviewer Erik Adams complimented the drama between Jim and Pam, writing that it has "been given just the right amount of weight". He criticized the episode for being "one of the loudest tonal clashes in the history of The Office", comparing it negatively to the previous episode, "Promos". He said that the other storylines seemed crammed into the episode, particularly due to the writers' decision to flesh out the supporting cast. Adams gave the episode a C. M. Giant of Television Without Pity awarded the episode a "B".

Roth Cornet of IGN called "Stairmageddon" an "odd one" for feeling like both a standalone episode that utilized the full ensemble, but also "one of the final five episodes of this nine-year series", due to the Jim-Pam and Dwight-Angela storylines. He praised the Jim-Pam storyline for its realism and depth, but worried that their eventual reconciliation would not feel earned, due to the few episodes left in the series. He praised the Dwight-Clark-Stanley storyline, writing that "the true comedy in the episode came primarily from Dwight" and called it Clark Duke's "strongest appearance to date". Cornet gave the episode a 7.8 out of 10, calling it "Good". Dan Forcella of TV Fanatic called the episode "the funniest episode on television this week", considering it a "gem" from the season. Forcella also praised the Jim-Pam-Dwight dynamic throughout the episode and the humor coming from Andy's storyline. He awarded the episode 5 stars out of 5.

Roseanne Barr's performance was later submitted by the producers of The Office for an "Outstanding Guest Actor in Comedy Series" Emmy consideration.
