= Allan Havey =

American stand-up comic and actor

- Born: St. Louis, Missouri, United States
- Occupations: Actor, comedian

Allan Havey is an American stand-up comic and actor. He started his career as a comedian in New York City in 1981.

== Overview ==
Havey made his national debut in 1986 on Late Night with David Letterman and made many appearances on the show throughout the 1980s and 1990s. When Letterman left NBC for CBS after not being chosen to replace Johnny Carson as host of The Tonight Show, Havey was one of several comedians considered by NBC to replace Letterman on Late Night (Conan O'Brien was chosen as Letterman's successor on the latter show).

In November 1989, he was chosen by HBO Downtown Productions to host a show on The Comedy Channel (which later merged with Ha! to form Comedy Central). The show, Night After Night with Allan Havey, which initially ran for three hours nightly, presented Allan's unique stream of consciousness, celebrity interviews, news and film clips (with commentary), and unusual "on location" scenarios. Havey often recounted stories from his life, sometimes apocryphal or tongue in cheek, sometimes very real, in tandem with his breaking the fourth wall via riffing with those behind the camera, such as producer Sue Fellows or head writer Eddie Gorodetsky. Night After Night became a cult classic among fans. The show also featured the sketch "Audience of One," a "Viewer Mail" segment, "Dave the Weatherman," and announcer Nick Bakay, who left in 1992, to perform the same role on The Dennis Miller Show. Night After Night ran for three years.

In a Vanity Fair interview in April 2016, Havey discussed his long-standing fear of tadpoles and Battenburg cake.

Havey's film roles include Internal Affairs, Checking Out, Rounders, Hancock, Jerry Seinfeld's documentary Comedian, and Steven Soderberg's The Informant! On television, Havey's comedy was featured twice on HBO's One Night Stand; both appearances were nominated for CableACE Awards. As a television actor, Havey has guest starred on Seinfeld, Curb Your Enthusiasm, Punk'd, and The Sarah Silverman Program. In 2006, Havey was cast as a lead in the Fox sitcom Free Ride, where he played Bob Stahlings, father of the main character Nate Stahlings. In 2012, he appeared on Ray Romano's Men of a Certain Age, in Disney's Good Luck Charlie and FX's Louie. In 2013, he was featured on two episodes of The Office and appeared on the AMC show Mad Men. In 2015, he appeared in episodes of the Amazon Studios series The Man in the High Castle and W/ Bob and David on Netflix.

Havey appeared on Ken Reid's TV Guidance Counselor Podcast on April 8, 2015.

From 2017-2023, Havey appeared as Karl Allard on Showtime's series Billions. From 2025-2026 he's had a recurring role as Enervate CEO Marv Putnam in The Paper on Peacock, a sitcom set in The Office universe.

== Filmography ==
=== Film ===
Year	Title	Role	Notes
1989	Checking Out	Pat Hagen	
1990	Love or Money	Hank Peterson	
1990	Internal Affairs	Judson	
1998	Rounders	Guberman	
2001	Knockaround Guys	Dean the Greenskeeper	
2009	The Informant!	FBI Special Agent Dean Paisley	
2014	Top Five	Pilot	
2016	Hail, Caesar!	Protestant Clergyman	
2018	Happy Anniversary	Weatherman	
2019	Plus One	Hannon	
2019	Bombshell	Victorious Player	
2022	Fourth of July	Dentist	

=== Television ===
Year	Title	Role	Notes
1989-92	Night After Night With Allan Havey	Host	
1996	Viper	Jay Lowery	"Talk Is Cheap"
1996	Seinfeld	Policeman	"The Wait Out"
2006	Free Ride	Bob Stahlings	Main role
2008	The Sarah Silverman Program	Judge	"The Mongolian Beef"
2008–09	Easy to Assemble	Illeana's Stalker / Frank	Recurring role
2012	Good Luck Charlie	Quint	"Catch Me If You Can"
2012	Louie	Allan Harvey	"Telling Jokes/Set Up"
2012	Up All Night	Uncle Dennis	"The Wedding"
2013	The Office	Mr. Bruegger	"The Farm", "Promos"
2013–15	Mad Men	Lou Avery	Recurring role
2015	W/ Bob & David	Glen 'The Optimist' Forbes	"1.4"
2015	The Man in the High Castle	Man with Lined Face	"The New World", "Sunrise", "The Illustrated Woman"
2016	Experts Guide to Bumble	Mr. Phillips	TV miniseries
2016	Code Black	Dennis	"Hero Complex"
2016	2 Broke Girls	Bill the Dealer	"And the Duck Stamp"
2017	Bosch	Roger	"God Sees", "Blood Under the Bridge"
2017	GLOW	Ron	"Debbie Does Something"
2017–23	Billions	Karl Allard	Recurring role
2024	Loot	Norm Lofton	"We Shouldn't Exist"
2025–26	The Paper	Marv Putnam	Recurring role
