= Promos (The Office) =

- The Office episode
- Episode no.: Season 9 Episode 18
- Directed by: Jennifer Celotta
- Written by: Tim McAuliffe
- Cinematography by: Matt Sohn
- Editing by: Rob Burnett
- Production code: 9018
- Original air date: April 4, 2013
- Running time: 22 minutes

Guest appearances
- Chris Diamantopoulos as Brian; Ryan Howard as himself; Allan Havey as Henry Bruegger; Nora Kirkpatrick as Esther Bruegger

Episode chronology
← Previous "The Farm"	Next → "Stairmageddon"
- The Office (American TV series) season 9

"Promos" is the eighteenth episode of the ninth season of the American comedy television series The Office and the 194th overall. The episode was written by Tim McAuliffe and directed by Jennifer Celotta. It originally aired on NBC on April 4, 2013. The episode guest stars sports star Ryan Howard, Chris Diamantopoulos, Nora Kirkpatrick, and Allan Havey. Former series regulars Steve Carell and B. J. Novak also appear through archival footage.

The series—presented as if it were a real documentary—depicts the everyday lives of office employees in the Scranton, Pennsylvania, branch of the fictional Dunder Mifflin Paper Company. In this episode, everyone in the office is excited when international promos for the documentary surface, but are soon horrified to discover how much candid filming has taken place. While everyone panics about their secrets being revealed, Pam Halpert (Jenna Fischer) reflects upon how much she and Jim (John Krasinski) have changed over the past nine years. Dwight Schrute (Rainn Wilson) makes Angela Lipton (Angela Kinsey) jealous when he starts dating a Brussels sprout farmer. Meanwhile, at Athlead's office in Philadelphia, Jim and Darryl Philbin (Craig Robinson) have a big meeting with baseball player Ryan Howard (not to be confused with the former series regular), who pitches a bizarre sci-fi sports movie about himself.

The episode received mostly positive reviews from critics; many felt that while the episode had an interesting theme and that much of the drama was successful, the humor was too broad or forced. The episode was viewed by 3.44 million viewers and received a 1.8/5 percent rating among adults between the ages of 18 and 49. The episode ranked fourth in its timeslot, and it was the highest-rated NBC series of the night, though it was lowest rated episode of The Office at the time of airing.

== Synopsis ==
The office is excited to see promos for the upcoming WVIA documentary The Office: An American Workplace, which consists of the footage of them that has been compiled over the past nine years. However, many of the workers are dismayed to learn just how much of their activities have been recorded; for instance, Dwight and Angela's affair that occurred a year ago was captured. Several excuse themselves and go to the warehouse to talk, turning off their microphones in an unsuccessful effort to keep the discussion private. Pete Miller suggests that Pam Halpert talk to dismissed crew member Brian to learn more. At Brian's house, Pam tells him that upon seeing the old footage she thinks Jim's feelings for her have largely faded, and Brian agrees. When she asks about what the crew filmed, he tells her that every important moment was captured even when not wearing their microphones. Realizing the extent to which their privacy has been violated, Pam storms out of Brian's house. On re-watching the promo, Pam decides she is glad that the history of her relationship with Jim has been captured.

Angela Lipton and Oscar Martinez call Angela's husband Senator Robert Lipton to inform him that the documentary will probably out him and reveal that Angela slept with Dwight. Andy Bernard becomes obsessed with online comments regarding his brief appearance in the promo, posting lengthy replies and even uploading his own video in response to negative reactions. The documentary crew discovers that Nellie Bertram has left at least some of the negative comments, taking pleasure in Andy's annoyance.

Dwight Schrute starts dating a Brussels sprout farmer, Esther Bruegger, while negotiating the purchase of a tractor with her father Henry. Dwight does poorly in the negotiations, yielding to all of Henry's terms. During the haggling, Esther's sisters flirt with Clark Green and try to coax him into buying farming equipment. Clark stops Dwight from signing the papers and takes him aside to tell him that he thinks Esther and her sisters are too physically attractive to be interested in men like them, and that Esther is probably just dating him so that her father can take advantage of him on the tractor deal. Dwight sees the logic in Clark's suspicion. However, Esther appears and tells Dwight that he should not sign the contract and negotiate for a better deal. Dwight realizes that Esther does care for him after all, and they go for a ride on the tractor, much to Angela's dismay.

At the Athlead offices, Jim Halpert and Darryl Philbin have a meeting with Major League Baseball player Ryan Howard. The meeting ends up with Darryl and Jim reading Ryan's self-written screenplay of a baseball player turned alien-fighting superhero.

== Production ==
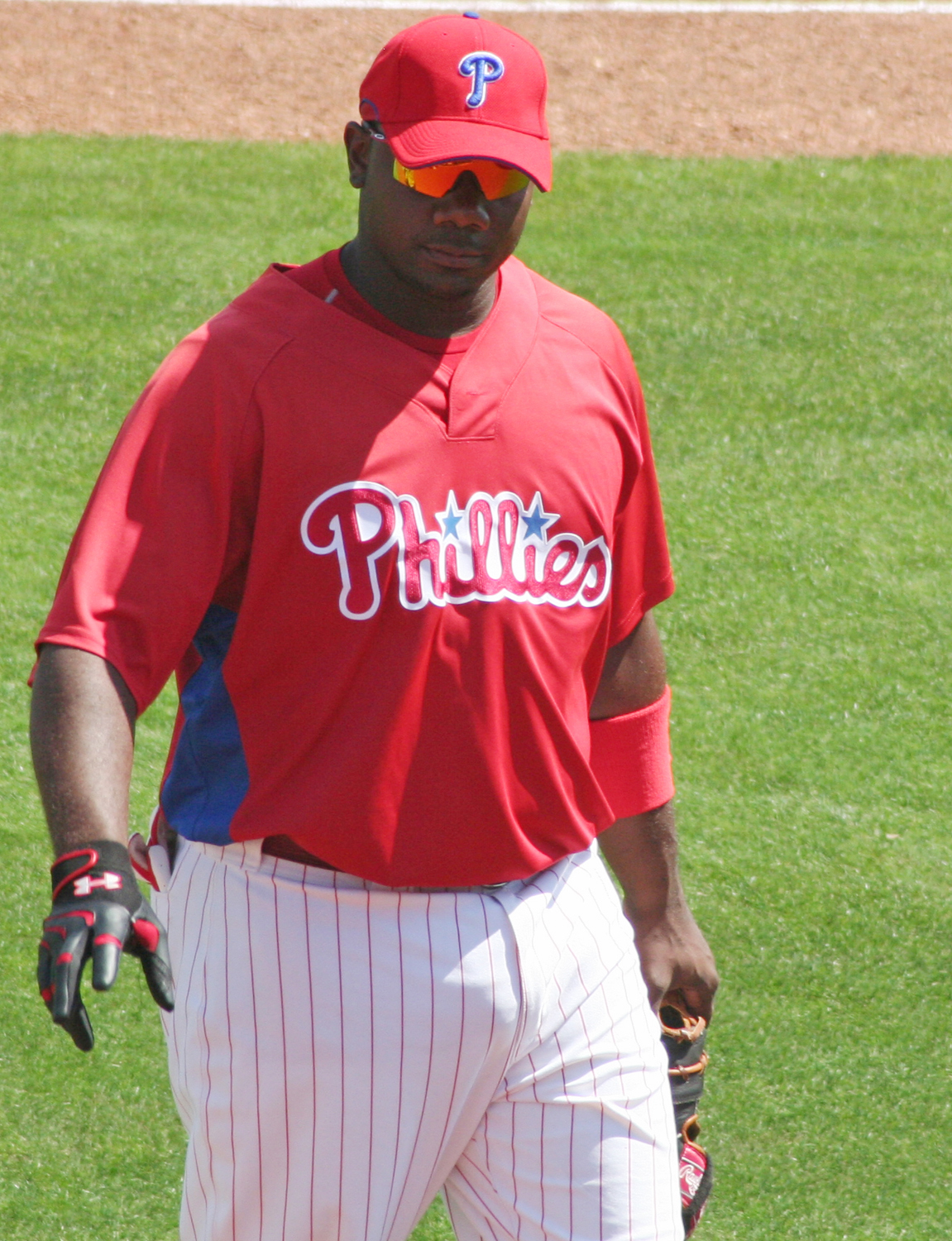
The episode guest stars sports star Ryan Howard.

"Promos" was written by consulting producer Tim McAuliffe, his first writing credit for the series. It was directed by former series writer, director, and co-showrunner Jennifer Celotta, her third such credit for the series. The episode features Philadelphia Phillies star Ryan Howard playing himself. This marks the second time a major sports star has played themselves for the season, as former Philadelphia 76ers star Julius Erving portrayed himself in the episode "Lice". Robinson later said that Ryan "killed it" and that "He's pretty damn funny in real life, which doesn't always translate to TV". He also joked that Howard is "definitely a better actor than John Krasinski. Without a doubt." The titular promos are composed of stock footage from The Office, primarily from early seasons of the series. They feature the departed characters Michael Scott (Steve Carell) and Ryan Howard (B. J. Novak).

== Cultural references ==
In the cold open, Phyllis is seen listening to an audiobook of the erotic romance novel Fifty Shades of Grey on her iPod, which makes everyone uncomfortable due to her arousal. Ryan Howard makes reference to the restaurant Subway's slogan, "Eat Fresh", a reference to the fact that he is a spokesman for the franchise. During the table read of Howard's screenplay, he mentions that it is of utmost importance for them to secure the rights to the character Darth Vader from the popular space movie series Star Wars. Oscar notes that Angela's husband—when he was dressed as former US president Ronald Reagan for Halloween—kissed him like former president John F. Kennedy. The title of the in-series documentary, The Office: An American Workplace, is the name given to the series itself when it was broadcast in the UK to differentiate it from the British version of the show. In the context of the series and episode, it is revealed that the documentary is scheduled to air on WVIA-TV, the actual Scranton PBS affiliate.

== Reception ==
=== Ratings ===
"Promos" originally aired on April 4, 2013 on NBC. In its original American broadcast, the episode was viewed by an estimated 3.44 million viewers and received a 1.8 rating/5 percent share. This means that it was seen by 1.8 percent of all 18- to 49-year-olds, and 5 percent of all 18- to 49-year-olds watching television at the time of the broadcast. This marked a decrease in the ratings from the previous episode, "The Farm". The Office ranked fourth in its timeslot, being beaten by an entry of the ABC series Grey's Anatomy which received a 2.8/8 percent rating, an episode of the CBS police procedural Person of Interest which received a 2.7/8 percent rating, and an installment of the Fox comedy series New Girl which earned a 2.0/6 rating.

=== Reviews ===
Erik Adams of The A.V. Club awarded the episode a "B−". He noted that it "represents a tipping point for The Office" because it eliminates the fact that—while the characters have known they were on camera—many of the people that the documentary is following have not realized the extent to which the camera people have been following and recording them." Adams said that strong plots such as Pam's realization about her relationship with Jim were rushed, and that other plots, like Dwight's, were made to "[run] out the clock". M. Giant of Television Without Pity awarded the episode a "B−".

Roth Cornet of IGN awarded the episode a 7.9 out of 10, denoting a "good" episode. She argued the episode had a "cohesive, united feel", even though Jim and Darryl were separated from the main action, that "past, present, and (possible) future combined together nicely", and that "the emotion wasn't overplayed". However, she said that this was not the "funniest episode of The Office that we've ever seen". Dan Forcella of TV Fanatic awarded the episode 3.5 stars out of 5, and criticized the reintroduction of Brian, saying it felt "forced" and that it ruined "something so innately interesting".

Nick Campbell of TV.com wrote that the quality of the episode hinged on whether or not the viewer could accept the fact that the characters were unaware of the extent of the footage that the camera crew caught. He wrote that "If you can ride with the Scranton branch not understanding what 'being filmed all the time' means, this might have been a pretty funny episode. If you can't ... then the premise of this episode is pretty awful." He concluded that while "Promos" had "its moments", it was not the most solid of the series' episodes. Alan Sepinwall of HitFix felt that "there was good idea hiding inside of 'The Promo' [sic]", but that much of the episode was undermined by the broad nature of the humor.
