= Moving On (The Office) =

- The Office episode
- Episode no.: Season 9 Episode 16
- Directed by: Jon Favreau
- Written by: Graham Wagner
- Cinematography by: Matt Sohn
- Editing by: Claire Scanlon
- Production code: 9017
- Original air date: February 14, 2013
- Running time: 41 minutes

Guest appearances
- Andy Buckley as David Wallace; Bob Odenkirk as Mark Franks; Zach Woods as Gabe Lewis; Mary Gillis as Shirley; Michael Weston as Roger; Collette Wolfe as Alice

Episode chronology
← Previous "Couples Discount"	Next → "The Farm"
- The Office (American season 9)

"Moving On" is the sixteenth episode of the ninth season of the American comedy television series The Office and the 192nd episode overall. The episode was written by Graham Wagner and directed by Jon Favreau. It originally aired on NBC on February 14, 2013. The episode guest stars Bob Odenkirk, Mary Gillis, Collette Wolfe and Andy Buckley. The episode also features the return of former series regular Zach Woods as Gabe Lewis.

The series—presented as if it were a real documentary—depicts the everyday lives of office employees in the Scranton, Pennsylvania, branch of the fictional Dunder Mifflin Paper Company. In this episode, Pam Halpert (Jenna Fischer) interviews for a job in Philadelphia, but her potential manager (Odenkirk) reminds her of her former boss, Michael Scott. Dwight Schrute (Rainn Wilson) recruits Angela Martin (Angela Kinsey) to help give his elderly aunt (Gillis) a bath. Meanwhile, Andy Bernard (Ed Helms) attempts to make Pete Miller (Jake Lacy) and Erin Hannon (Ellie Kemper) feel uncomfortable by hiring their ex-lovers.

On February 8, 2013, NBC announced that the episode would be expanded to fill a one-hour television block, although it still counts as one official episode. The episode received largely positive reviews, although many were critical of the episode's extended length, which they argued felt padded. The episode was viewed by 4.06 million viewers and received a 2/6 percent rating among adults between the ages of 18 and 49. The episode ranked third in its timeslot, and it was the highest-rated NBC series of the night.

== Synopsis ==
David Wallace scolds Andy Bernard for lying about his three-month absence from the office. David later tells Andy that he will not fire him, thanking him for helping him buy the company, but warns Andy that he is on very thin ice. Andy learns that Erin Hannon is dating Pete Miller, which they have been holding in secrecy from him in order to make his breakup with Erin easier. Though Andy does not figure this out at first, having called Pete "Plop" for so long he forgot his name, he realizes the truth upon finding a lunch bag with his name on it.

Andy attempts to fire Pete, but Toby Flenderson points out that he cannot do this since Pete and Erin already disclosed their relationship and that he cannot fire people simply over grudges. Erin and Pete then both lecture Andy about moving on, claiming that working alongside one's ex-lover does not have to be awkward. To refute this claim, Andy hires both Pete's ex-girlfriend Alice and Erin's ex-boyfriend Gabe Lewis. After giving Pete and Erin time to appreciate how uncomfortable this is, he holds a meeting with them and their ex-lovers, leading the two couples to argue with each other. Andy tells the camera that seeing Erin and Pete unhappy has made him feel better.

Dwight Schrute requests the help of Angela Lipton in caring for his ailing Aunt Shirley. Angela initially refuses, but gives in when Dwight begins describing her ailments in grotesque detail. At the house, Angela is horrified by Dwight's treatment of his Aunt: he consistently speaks to her in a condescending tone, proposes to cut off her worn-out clothing with a utility knife, and "bathes" her by spraying her with a high-pressure water hose like a cow. After subduing Dwight by spraying him with the hose, Angela insists on washing and grooming Shirley in a more dignified manner. Through the process, Dwight and Angela recall their feelings for each other. At the end of the day, they begin kissing, but Angela reminds Dwight that she is married and says she will not leave her husband even though he does not care for her. Dwight accepts this, admitting that he would want that same loyalty from her if she were his wife.

Toby has been discussing the details of the Scranton Strangler case with Nellie Bertram for some time, feeling the guilty verdict he helped deliver was rushed. Having grown weary of the subject, she snaps at him that he should do something about it. Toby accordingly goes to the local prison to talk to the person convicted of being the notorious local murderer and tell him he believes he is innocent. Offscreen, the convict begins strangling Toby for his part in the conviction. However, Toby does have his spirits lifted, realizing he was guilty and after Nellie gives him a lift from the hospital and commends him for his bravery.

Pam Halpert leaves the office to interview for a job in Philadelphia; when Andy tries to assert his authority by asking where she is going, Pam snaps "not on a three-month boat trip" and walks out as Andy looks on in defeat while the rest of the office looks at him with disgust. At the interview, Pam finds her potential manager, Mark, is remarkably like her former Dunder Mifflin regional manager Michael Scott. While this initially amuses her, Pam gradually realizes that the prospect of working under another Michael Scott is abhorrent, and her horror increases when Mark reveals that she is interviewing for a glorified receptionist's job. During dinner, Pam talks about her interview to Jim Halpert, during which she tells him that even if she liked the prospective job and boss, she would not have wanted to take it. Her reasons being that she does not want to move to Philadelphia, despite Jim having started his own business there.

Oscar Martinez cues up a television show on his computer, and while the ad loads, he does gravity-boot sit-ups. While he is struggling to get down, the camera zooms in on an upcoming television guide on Oscar's computer screen that reveals that the in-series documentary—called The Office: An American Workplace—will air in May.

== Production ==
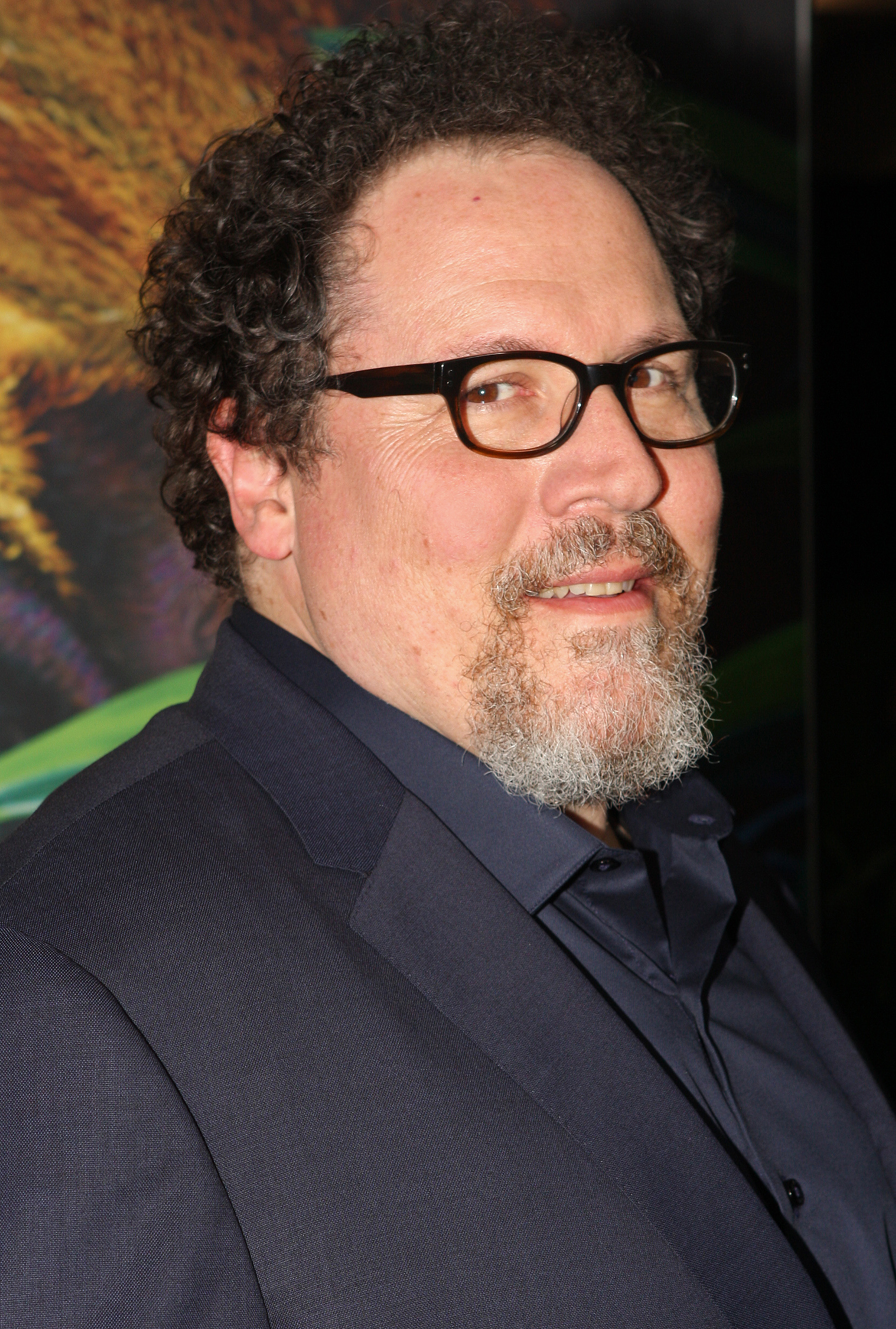
The episode was directed by Jon Favreau.

"Moving On" was written by series producer Graham Wagner, making it his second episode for the series after the earlier ninth-season episode "The Target". The episode was directed by filmmaker Jon Favreau, marking his first directing credit for the series and the first time he has directed for a television comedy since Fox's Undeclared. Fischer noted that, because Favreau got his start as an actor in "quiet, character-based comedies", his directing of The Office was a "return to that" type of comedy. On February 8, 2013, NBC announced that the episode would be expanded to fill a one-hour television block, although it still counts as one official episode.

The episode guest stars Bob Odenkirk—who had previously been considered for the role of Michael Scott—as Pam's potential employer, Mary Gillis as Aunt Shirley, and Andy Buckley as David Wallace. The episode also features the return of former series regular Zach Woods as Gabe Lewis. Woods was introduced in the sixth-season episode "Sabre" and was added to the series as a regular with the premiere of the seventh season. Woods's contract was not renewed at the beginning of the ninth season, but series showrunner Greg Daniels revealed that Woods would be returning; he noted "It's kind of a neat story turn ... He's going to come back and we're all excited to see him back".

== Cultural references ==
When he is being yelled at by Wallace, Andy references American rapper Vanilla Ice and musician Jon Bon Jovi. Andy gives Clark (Clark Duke) various nicknames, including "Clarker Posey" (a reference to American actress Parker Posey), "Clarkwork Orange" (a reference to the novel A Clockwork Orange and the film of the same name) and "Zero Clark Thirty" (a reference to the film Zero Dark Thirty). At the Philadelphia office, Mark alludes to pop culture, with references to the 2011 film Horrible Bosses and the 2012 film Django Unchained. He also sings the K-pop hit "Gangnam Style" by Psy, and reads Pam's resume as if he were Bob Dylan. Mark also makes a reference to the Spanish Inquisition sketch from Monty Python, but misattributes it to the Canadian sketch comedy group The Kids in the Hall. Near the end of Pam's interview, Mark questions her on whether she enjoys the HBO series Curb Your Enthusiasm; Odenkirk actually had a role in the third episode of the first season of Curb Your Enthusiasm. The title of the in-series documentary, The Office: An American Workplace, is the name given to the series itself when it was broadcast in the UK to differentiate it from the British version of the show.

== Broadcast and reception ==
=== Ratings ===
"Moving On" originally aired on NBC on February 14, 2013. In its original American broadcast, the episode was viewed by an estimated 4.06 million viewers and received a 2.0 rating/6 percent share. This means that it was seen by 2.0 percent of all 18-to-49-year-olds, and 6 percent of all 18-to-49-year-olds watching television at the time of the broadcast. This marked a slight decrease in the ratings from the previous episode, "Vandalism". The Office ranked third in its timeslot, being beaten by an episode of the CBS police procedural Person of Interest which received a 3.0/8 percent rating, and an entry of the ABC series Grey's Anatomy which received a 2.8/8 percent rating. The ratings for "Moving On" were the best for NBC in the 9–10 p.m. Thursday timeslot since November 8, 2012.

=== Reviews ===
Jeff Alexander of Television Without Pity awarded the episode an "A−". Damon Houx of Screen Crush called the episode the "highlight" of the season. In particular, he was pleased with the way Pam and Jim's strife was portrayed; he wrote that "tonight the ... drama felt earned in a way it hadn't previous" and that "Jim and Pam were used well". Houx was also extremely pleased with Odenkirk's performance, writing that, "Even if Odenkirk is doing an impression of Steve Carell's character, not only is it great for the non-comedy comedy, but you can totally see a parallel universe where Odenkirk played Michael Scott and nailed it as well as Carell did." He concluded that, with Odenkirk's presence, "In about twenty seconds this became the best episode of the season." Kelly West of Cinema Blend gave a moderately positive review, noting that the entry "dealt with some of the ongoing issues among the staff of Dunder Mifflin. With the exception of a pretty great guest appearance by Breaking Bad's Bob Odenkirk (Better call Saul!) and some interesting developments in the relationship department for some of the characters, the episode was fairly standard. And then came the very end, which offered an interesting reveal and a teaser of something big."

IGN writer Roth Cornet awarded the episode a 6.9, denoting an "okay" episode. She called the episode "the real beginning of the end". Cornet, however, was critical of the episode's length, specifically pin-pointing the Philadelphia scenes, noting that they "went on too long". She concluded that "I feel for the writers, who I honestly believe were forced to stretch their content this season", as well as for the episode. Nick Campbell of TV.com was unhappy that the episode did not show or comment on Pam and Jim's fight in the previous episode. He felt that the beginning of the dinner scene was nice, due to the two's banter. However, he felt that the end pretended as if they had not discussed the move in any previous episodes. Campbell felt that Odenkirk was used in a good way, but that was "a waste of amazing talent at the real estate office". He also felt that Dwight and Angela's kiss was a good progression for their story.

Erik Adams of The A.V. Club awarded the episode "C−", and criticized its extended nature. He said that it was "both brimming with narrative yet straining to fill its allotted time." Adams argued that elements, like Toby's visit to the prison, seemed like tacked on codas intended to increase the length of the show. He also felt that Odenkirk's performance was humorous, but dragged on too long and played the joke too far. Adams, however, was complimentary towards Angela and Dwight's subplot, calling it the most "daring" of the episode's various subplots, and saying it provided momentum for the episode. Alan Sepinwall of HitFix called the episode "unpleasant', largely due to Andy's presence; he felt that the character "continues to dominate the action and crush all the goodwill generated earlier in the season". However, he was very pleased with Odenkirk's performance, calling his acting "a pretty spot-on recreation of the early years [of The Office]". Bob Odenkirk's performance was later submitted by the producers of The Office for an "Outstanding Guest Actor in Comedy Series" Emmy consideration.
