= Customer Loyalty (The Office) =

- The Office episode
- "Customer Loyalty" was the first episode of The Office to reveal a member of the show's fictional documentary crew, in this case a man named Brian, shown here comforting a tearful Pam after her fight with Jim.
- Episode no.: Season 9 Episode 12
- Directed by: Kelly Cantley
- Written by: Jonathan Green; Gabe Miller
- Cinematography by: Matt Sohn
- Editing by: Rob Burnett
- Production code: 9013
- Original air date: January 24, 2013
- Running time: 22 minutes

Guest appearances
- Chris Diamantopoulos as Brian; Linda Purl as Helen Beesly

Episode chronology
| ← Previous "Suit Warehouse" | Next → "Junior Salesman" |
- The Office (American season 9)

"Customer Loyalty" is the twelfth episode of the ninth season of the American comedy television series The Office and the 188th episode overall. The episode was written by Jonathan Green and Gabe Miller, and directed by Kelly Cantley. It originally aired on NBC on January 24, 2013. The episode guest stars Chris Diamantopoulos as Brian the boom mike operator, and Ben Silverman as Isaac, a coworker of Jim's.

The series—presented as if it were a real documentary—depicts the everyday lives of office employees in the Scranton, Pennsylvania, branch of the fictional Dunder Mifflin Paper Company. In this episode, Jim Halpert (John Krasinski) is forced to miss his daughter's first recital after a major investor exits his company, leading to a fight with his wife Pam (Jenna Fischer). Dwight Schrute (Rainn Wilson) tries to prevent Darryl Philbin (Craig Robinson) from leaving the office. Nellie Bertram (Catherine Tate) tries to put an end to Pete Miller (Jake Lacy) and Erin Hannon's (Ellie Kemper) flirting with each other. This episode also begins to finally reveal who is behind the documentary.

The episode received largely positive reviews from television critics; many praised Krasinski and Fischer for the dramatic fight at the end. Furthermore, the reveal of the camera crew was commented upon by many critics. The episode was viewed by 4.19 million viewers and received a 2.0/5 percent rating among adults between the ages of 18 and 49, ranking third in its timeslot. The episode ultimately ranked as the highest-rated NBC series of the night.

== Synopsis ==
Dwight Schrute is upset that Darryl Philbin will be leaving Dunder-Mifflin to join Athlead, Jim Halpert's startup. He tries to browbeat Darryl into staying with Dunder-Mifflin by tallying up his perceived job failures since taking the Athlead job and holding a meeting on customer loyalty with a customer he describes as "enraged", but who demurs at the characterization. When this is ineffective, Dwight joins Darryl's delivery run to make the job more "fun", including ordering a milkshake at a fast food drive-through and throwing it at the server, shouting "Fire in the hole!" Morally outraged, Darryl forces Dwight to stay behind and clean up the mess, whereupon another customer pulls the same prank on Dwight himself. Darryl later laughs at footage of the event that has been uploaded onto the internet, saying that this is what he will miss when he moves to Philadelphia.

Nellie Bertram assigns Erin Hannon and Pete Miller to a social media project that meets with some success. She notices the two flirting with each other for the first time and assumes that she brought it on with the project, citing several unintentional double entendres in her project e-mails. She feels guilty because Erin is Andy Bernard's girlfriend and Andy recommended Nellie to the adoption agency, and is afraid that Andy will fire her when he finds out. She hijacks Dwight's customer loyalty meeting to talk about fidelity in relationships, which soon zeroes in on Erin and Pete. Nellie also ends the social media project so they will not be able to flirt. Shamed by Nellie's fidelity speech, Erin assumes a coldly professional attitude towards Pete. However, a talk with Toby Flenderson reminds Nellie that Andy was not the best boyfriend to Erin and Nellie has second thoughts. She soon restarts the project, "forcing" Erin and Pete to work together again, much to their delight.

Jim's plan to drive home from Philadelphia to see his daughter Cece's ballet recital hits a snag when a major investor says he is backing out. Jim asks his wife Pam Halpert to record the recital with her phone, which she agrees to do. During the opening of the recital, she stops recording to take a phone call informing her that she has been chosen to paint an important public mural. In her excitement, she messes up the recording and fails to record any of Cece's appearance. Jim calls her that evening to tell her the investor backed out, and his group will have to work long hours to make up the lost funds. He asks her to send him her recording of the recital as a way to cheer him up, and Pam confesses that she did not tape it. She tries to make light of the mishap by making self-deprecating remarks and pointing out that they can get recordings of the recital from other attendees, but he becomes frustrated at her, scolding her and starting a fight over his new job, the time he spends away from the family, and the sacrifices they are making to get their new life to work. After he hangs up, Pam breaks down in tears. A previously unseen boom operator named Brian enters into the shot and comforts her, and tells the crew to stop filming.

== Production ==
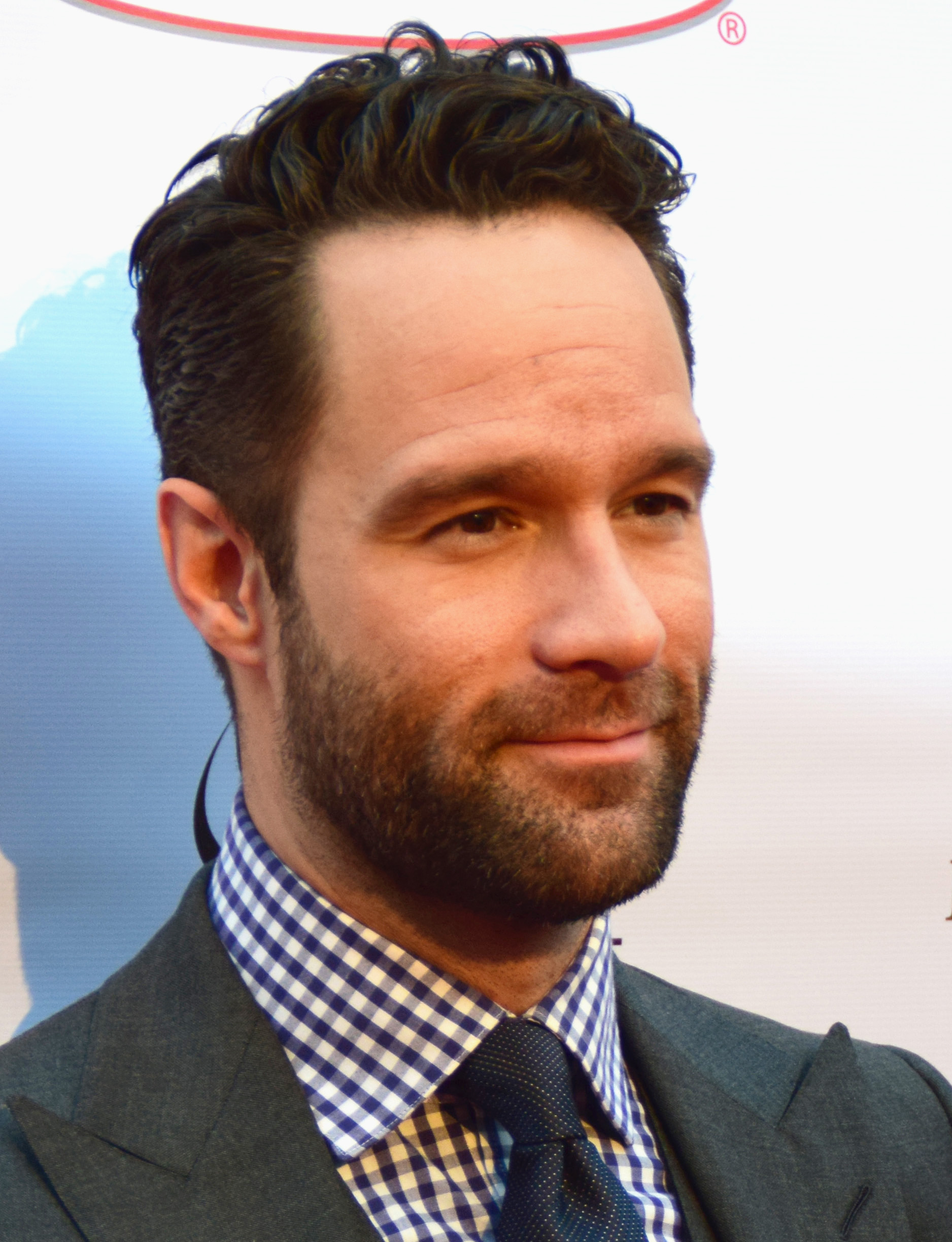
The episode guest starred Chris Diamantopoulos as the boom mic operator for the fictional documentary.

"Customer Loyalty" was written by co-executive producers Jonathan Green and Gabe Miller, their second writing credit for the series after "Andy's Ancestry". It was directed by Kelly Cantley, making her television directorial debut; Cantley previously served as a first assistant director on the series and directed The Office webisode series The Mentor.

The episode is the first of the series to actively feature a member of the documentary crew interacting with the characters on screen; before the episode was aired, showrunner Greg Daniels stated that this episode would begin to reveal who was behind the documentary. Originally, the idea to have a sound man named Brian comfort Pam when she was crying was proposed by former series actress and writer Mindy Kaling. According to an interview with B. J. Novak, she had proposed it during the show's third season. The episode guest stars Chris Diamantopoulos as Brian the boom operator. Brian's character is named after the series' actual boom mic operator, Brian Wittle. Wittle played the part of one of the annoyed parents at Cece's recital. Ben Silverman also appears as Issac, one of Jim's coworkers at Athlead. This marks Silverman's third appearance, after cameoing in the episodes "Here Comes Treble" and "Suit Warehouse".

The cold open features a montage of Jim setting up a prank—which involves sending Dwight on a quest for the Holy Grail. Through Jim's voice-over, it is heavily suggested that Jim set up the prank sometime circa 2006, which would have taken place during the show's second season. Appropriately, the montage was filmed to look as if the documentarians were using archival footage of Jim; his hair matches the style that Jim had during the first few seasons of the show. This is not the first time this technique has been used on the show. During the cold open for the sixth season episode "Shareholder Meeting", a montage of Dwight harassing past receptionists was shown. Furthermore, during the seventh season episode "Threat Level Midnight" was filmed to give the impression that Threat Level Midnight, an amateur feature directed by Michael Scott, had been filmed and edited during the first seven or so seasons of the show.

== Broadcast and reception ==
=== Ratings ===
"Customer Loyalty" originally aired on NBC on January 24, 2013. Before the premiere of the episode, OfficeTally—the largest fan site for the series—was given a message by the show's producers that urged fans to watch "Customer Loyalty" due to the major reveal at the end of the episode. Reportedly, the producers had never done this before. In its original American broadcast, the episode was viewed by 4.19 million viewers and received a 2.0 rating/5 percent share among adults between the ages of 18 and 49. This means that it was seen by 2.0 percent of all 18- to 49-year-olds, and 5 percent of all 18- to 49-year-olds watching television at the time of the broadcast. The Office ranked third in its timeslot, being beaten by an episode of the ABC series Grey's Anatomy which received a 3.0/8 percent rating, and an installment of the Fox series Glee which received a 2.6/7 percent rating. The Office was the highest-rated NBC television program on the night it aired. 2.04 million viewers watched the episode through DVR playback, bringing the total viewership to 6.24 million.

=== Reviews ===
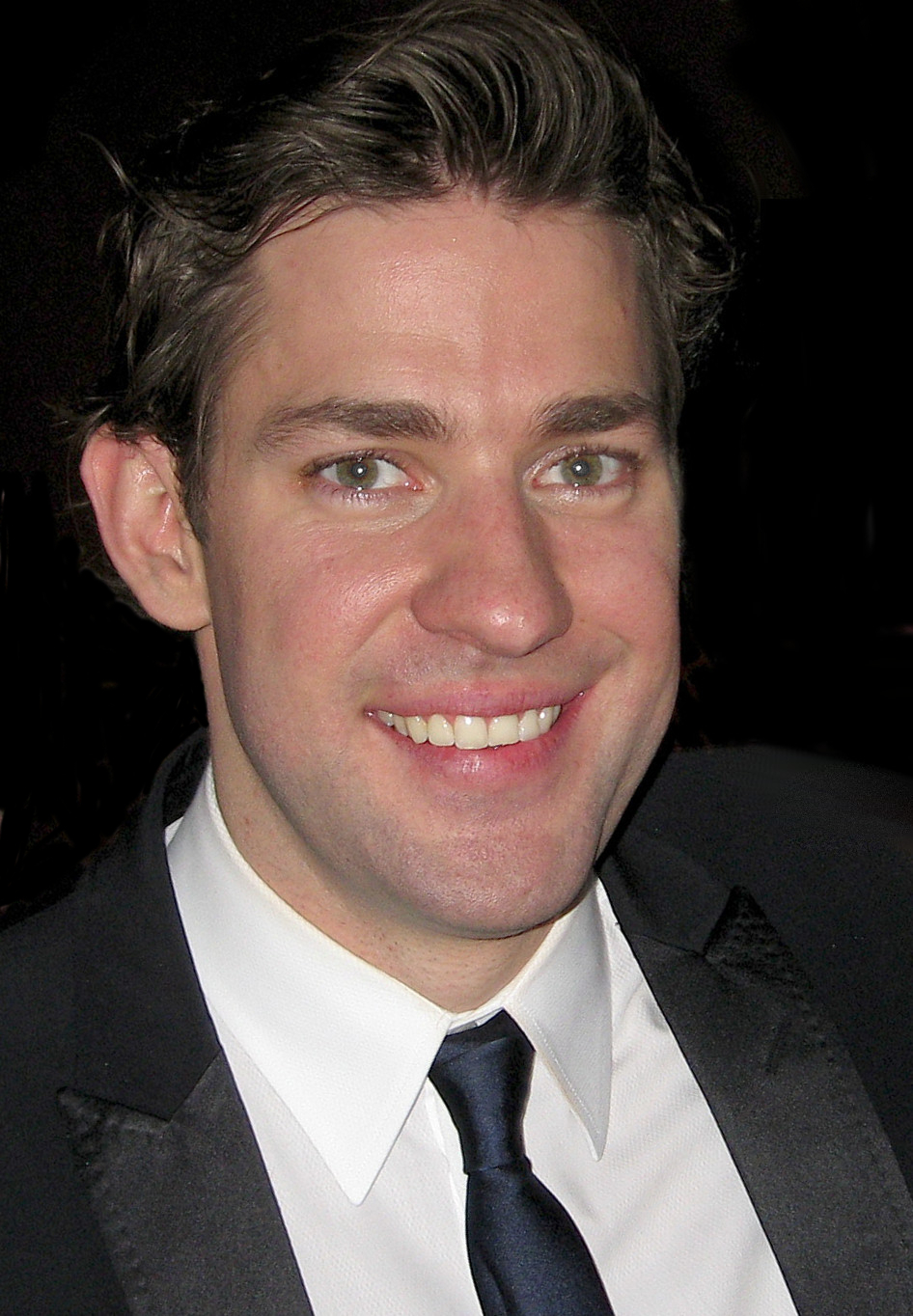
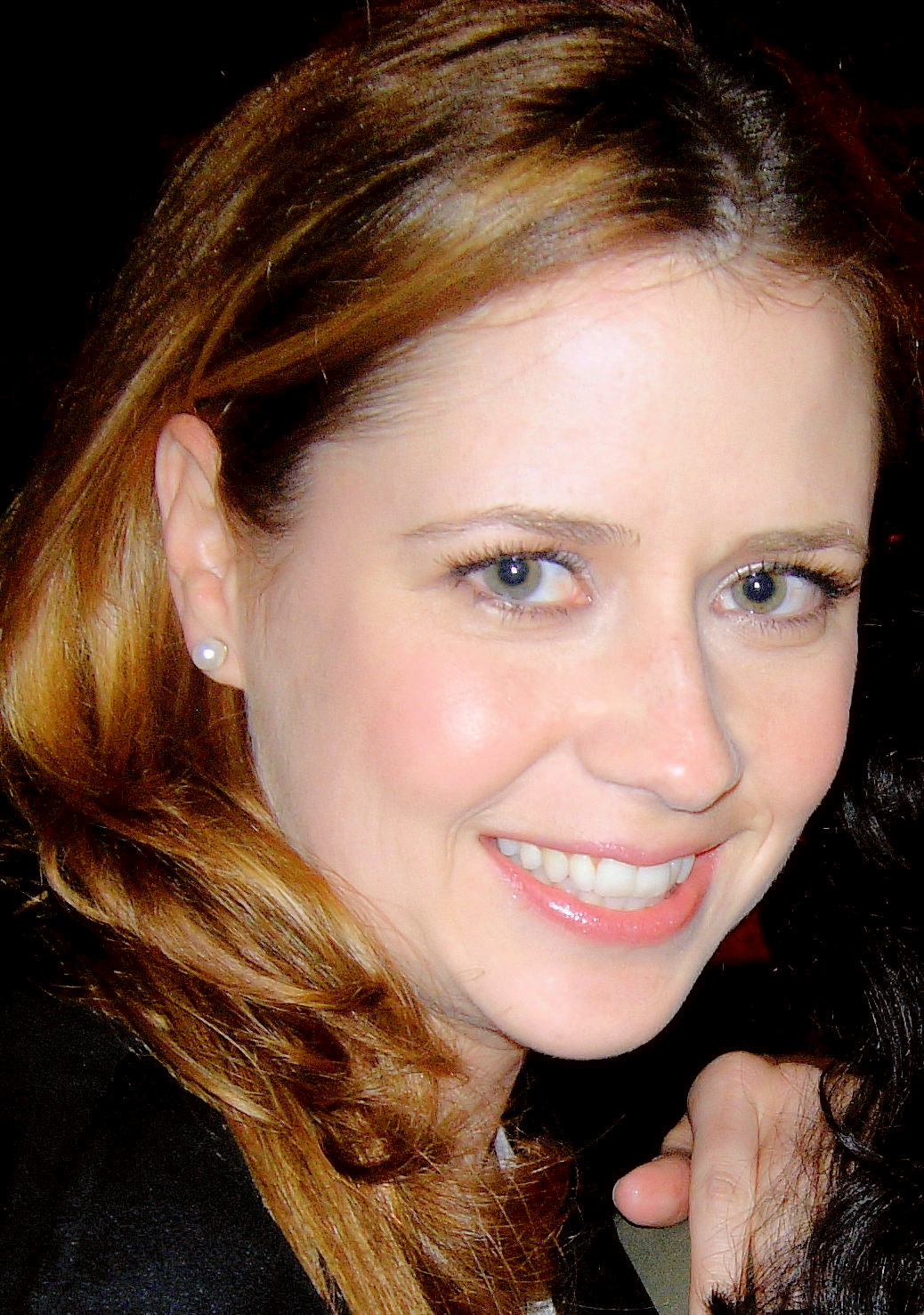
Many critics praised the acting of John Krasinski (left) and Jenna Fischer (right). Many reviews said the fight at the end of the episode was presented in a believable fashion.

"Customer Loyalty" received largely positive reviews from television critics. James Poniewozik of Time magazine concluded that it "showed the stakes behind its characters' paper-pushing lives in a way it hasn't since Michael Scott left Scranton." He called the first half a "wacky ensemble show", but said that the last part featured elements that allowed the audience to "all but hear the old machinery [of earlier episodes] waking up and sliding into place". Poniewozik stated that Jim and Pam's fight was "believable in its arc and its parameters" and that both characters were presented in a way in which their plights were understandable. Ally Serrigran of Hollywood.com wrote that the "episode was one worth tuning in for." She felt that, for fans of the show who had left when Steve Carell departed, "Customer Loyalty" was the right episode for them to come back to the series. She called the fight between Jim and Pam "jarring in and of itself". Mark Perigard of the Boston Herald commented on the fight between Jim and Pam, writing that it "felt just like the kind of argument that two real people would have." Brett Harrison Davinger of the California Literary Review wrote that the episode was "fine" and was composed of "several small storylines, all of which worked". Davinger called the ending "odd" but "effective".

Michael Tedder of Vulture wrote positively of the episode and awarded it four out of five stars. He called the final fight between Pam and Jim "ugly and real" and one in which "the writers didn't flinch", in that it truly made him feel uncomfortable. Tedder complimented both Fischer and Krasinski, and wrote that Krasinski "doesn't try to make Jim look charming in this fight, just terrified and exhausted." He called Nellie's subplot "the best use of this new version of Nellie", but wrote that Dwight and Darryl's subplot was undeveloped. Rick Porter of Zap2it felt that, while the episode was "up and down" (he wrote that Dwight and Darryl's subplot was "flat", but that Erin and Pete's yielded several humorous lines) the final confrontation between Jim and Pam was "a big dose of reality" and that it was not "a contrived fight". David Wilcox of The Citizen wrote that the fight between Pam and Jim was "welcome" because their relationship had grown stale ever since they had "hooked up and started living their perfect little lives together." Wilcox praised the way in which the fight was written, and wrote that he "couldn't help smiling. Not because the fight wasn't wrenching to watch. But because it was." Cindy White of IGN awarded the episode a 7.8 out of 10, denoting a "good" episode. She reasoned that while the episode was funny but largely forgettable, the final scene made it worth watching.

Not all reviews were as positive. Erik Adams of The A.V. Club awarded the episode a "C+", and called it "a middle-of-the-road table-setting episode of The Office" with a "tacked-on coda". Adams wrote that the episode was "not really a 'story' at all" because it was dragged down by elements that are necessary for the episode to play as a standalone piece, even though "it's not meant to be taken as" one. Adams was complimentary towards the episode's cold open but wrote that "there aren't a whole lot of quality laughs in 'Customer Loyalty'". Nick Campbell of TV.com felt that the Erin and Pete relationship was not constructed properly, nor was the conclusion satisfying. Furthermore, he felt that the ending fight was "petty".

Many reviews commented on the reveal of the documentary crew. E! Online named the reveal one of the "Best TV Moments of the Week". Verne Gay of Newsday called the scene a "historic" moment for the show. Serrigran wrote that, between Jim and Pam fighting, and the cameramen making an appearance, the scene was "a lot to take in". However, she felt that the scene was properly done. Jason Hughes of The Huffington Post called the reveal a "huge" and "shocking" moment. Tedder called the reveal "something that we've never seen before on The Office." He admitted that, "the last five minutes of this episode genuinely startled me, which is an impressive feat for a series on its ninth and final season." Porter called the shots with Brian "good" because it reaffirmed that the camera crew was a character, one that had been an integral part of the show. Wilcox wrote that Brian's appearance was a "weird turn", and that it was "kind of funny" that the first time a member of the camera crew intervened with the characters was when Pam needed comforting and not "one of Dwight or Michael's dozens of near-death experiences." Poniewozik enjoyed the reveal of the documentary crew. However, he wrote that, "I don't know if I'm going to like the idea of making Brian an actual player in the events, if indeed that's where the show is going." Adams, on the other hand, said that the reveal of the cameramen was "a Big Moment for The Office, but it has a hollow ring to it" because the cameramen had never before interacted with the members of the office. Campbell wrote that "the show played its documentary crew trump card WAY [sic] too early" and noted that the crew had never intervened in past events that were on the same level as Pam crying.
