= Vandalism (The Office) =

- The Office episode
- Episode no.: Season 9 Episode 14
- Directed by: Lee Kirk
- Written by: Owen Ellickson
- Cinematography by: Matt Sohn
- Editing by: Claire Scanlon
- Production code: 9015
- Original air date: January 31, 2013
- Running time: 22 minutes

Guest appearances
- Jack Coleman as Robert Lipton; Chris Diamantopoulos as Brian; Brad William Henke as Frank; Ameenah Kaplan as Val Johnson; Mark Proksch as Nate Nickerson

Episode chronology
← Previous "Junior Salesman"	Next → "Couples Discount"
- The Office (American season 9)

"Vandalism" is the fourteenth episode of the ninth season of the American comedy television series The Office and the 190th episode overall. The episode was written by Owen Ellickson. It was directed by Lee Kirk, who is series star Jenna Fischer's husband. It originally aired on NBC on January 31, 2013. The episode guest stars Chris Diamantopoulos as Brian the boom mike operator, Mark Proksch as Nate, Brad William Henke as Frank, and Ameenah Kaplan as Val.

The series—presented as if it were a real documentary—depicts the everyday lives of office employees in the Scranton, Pennsylvania, branch of the fictional Dunder Mifflin Paper Company. In this episode, someone vandalizes Pam Halpert's warehouse mural. Distraught, she enlists Dwight Schrute (Rainn Wilson) and Nellie Bertram (Catherine Tate) to help her track down the vandal. Meanwhile, in their Philadelphia apartment, Darryl Philbin (Craig Robinson) is uncomfortable with Jim Halpert's (John Krasinski) uncleanliness. Angela Lipton (Angela Kinsey) begrudgingly allows Oscar Martinez (Oscar Nunez) and Kevin Malone (Brian Baumgartner) to attend her son Phillip's first birthday party.

The episode received mixed reviews from television critics; many felt that the subplot involving Brian (Diamantopoulos) being attracted to Pam was shoehorned into the series and served little function other than to create superfluous drama. The episode was viewed by 3.97 million viewers and received a 1.9/5 percent rating among adults between the ages of 18 and 49. Although the episode ranked first in its half-hour timeslot, it tied with the series finale of 30 Rock to be the second highest-rated NBC series of the night.

== Synopsis ==
Someone vandalizes Pam Halpert's warehouse mural. Distraught, she demands to know who was responsible, but the warehouse workers remain silent to protect their coworker. She then tries appealing to the sympathies of the other office workers, but with her husband Jim Halpert off in Philadelphia and regional manager Andy Bernard still away in the Bahamas, only Dwight Schrute and Nellie Bertram show any interest. The three lure warehouse worker Nate into the foreman's office, under the pretense of telling him that his mother is dying, and interrogate him in isolation; Nate soon cracks and identifies Frank as the vandal. They take the matter to human resources, and Toby Flenderson holds a meeting between the involved parties. Pam, presumably at Toby's suggestion, apologizes for having possibly infringed on Frank's space by using the warehouse to paint her mural, but Frank in response insults Pam and her mural profanely and insists that his drawing of butts was funny. Toby and Nellie both take Frank's side out of intimidation, so Pam and Dwight take things into their own hands by painting a grotesque nude man on Frank's truck with washable paint. Outside the office, as Pam tells the documentary crew that she feels it is appropriate that she used her art to enact her revenge for the vandalism, Frank shows up yelling in anger and lunges at Pam. This forces Brian, the crew's boom mic operator, to intervene by hitting Frank across the face with his mic, with the rest of the camera crew subsequently being forced to restrain Frank. Frank and Brian are subsequently fired by their respective employers. As Brian leaves, he tells Pam that he will always be there for her if she needs someone.

In their Philadelphia apartment, Darryl Philbin and Jim find their living styles are increasingly clashing. Jim is slovenly, leaving dirty dishes to soak in the sink until someone else washes them, while Darryl is so fastidious about his possessions that he puts labels with his name on all of them, even a bag of flour. When Darryl takes issue with Jim using his labeled coffee mug, the two begin bickering. Eventually the two come to understand each other's habits better, and relieve tension by playing a video game together.

Angela and Robert Lipton are celebrating their son Phillip's first birthday with a gathering of wealthy political allies. Angela is shocked to learn that Robert invited his lover Oscar Martinez to the party after she told Robert she did not want him there. Angela invites Dwight (her own extramarital lover) in retaliation, but he scorns the invitation in order to help Pam with her investigation. Kevin Malone hears of this and eagerly volunteers to go in Dwight's place. Angela had to accept since not doing so meant Kevin would have to take care of accounting by himself. Oscar, who believes he was invited because Robert is in love with him, is hurt when he finds out that he was invited to boost Robert's opinion in the polls among Latino voters. During the taking of a group photo, Robert has Oscar stand in a spot where he almost completely blocks off Angela, and Oscar and Angela begin to bicker with each other. After the party, Robert rebukes them for their behavior and admonishes them to do better in the future. However, Kevin interrupts to tell Robert that he enjoyed the food, and that Robert is a terrible person for treating Angela and Oscar strictly as a means to gain political support, secretly pleasing Angela and Oscar.

== Production ==
"Vandalism" was written by supervising producer Owen Ellickson, making it his third writing credit for the series. It was directed by Lee Kirk. This marks his first directorial entry for the series, although he had previously guest starred as the minor character Clark in the sixth season episode "The Delivery". Kirk is also Fischer's husband. The episode guest stars Diamantopoulos as Brian the boom mike operator, his third appearance after the preceding two episodes. Proksch returns as Nate, as does Kaplan as Val. This is the first episode to feature Henke as Frank. Daniels had teased in an interview that one character would be fired from the show "in Episode 15". Although "Vandalism" was the fourteenth episode aired, it was actually the fifteenth produced, based on production numbers.

== Broadcast and reception ==
=== Ratings ===
"Vandalism" originally aired right after "Junior Salesman" on NBC on January 31, 2013. In its original American broadcast, the episode was viewed by 3.97 million viewers, making it the second episode in the series, after the earlier ninth season entry "The Target", to dip below the 4 million threshold. It received a 1.9 rating/5 percent share among adults between the ages of 18 and 49. This means that it was seen by 1.9 percent of all 18- to 49-year-olds, and 5 percent of all 18- to 49-year-olds watching television at the time of the broadcast. The Office ranked first in its half hour timeslot, and tied with the series finale of 30 Rock to be the second highest-rated NBC series of the night, although 30 Rock garnered more viewers. Both the finale of 30 Rock and "Vandalism" were beaten by "Junior Salesman".

=== Reviews ===
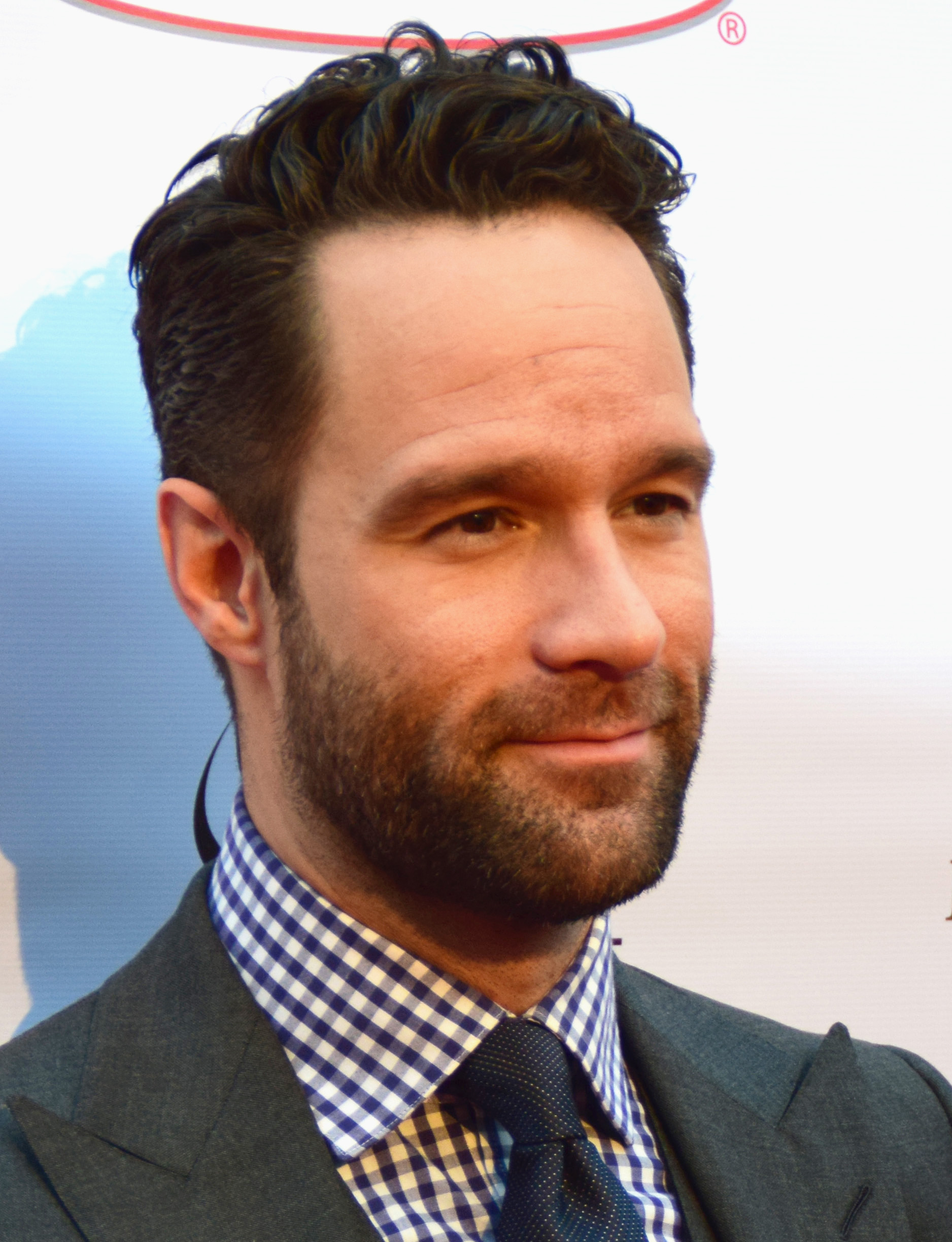
The episode's subplot involving Chris Diamantopoulos was met with scorn by most critics.

Michael Tedder of Vulture awarded the episode—along with "Junior Salesman"—four stars out of five. He enjoyed Kevin's telling off the Senator for his poor treatment of his friends and family, and said "that it came with Kevin's halting delivery just made it better." However, he was critical of the Brian subplot, calling it "the least interesting way this camera crew reveal could have gone". Roth Cornet of IGN awarded the episode a 7 out of 10, denoting a "good" episode. Despite noting that the show itself was still good in comparison to much of television, Cornet wrote that the episode is an example of the "danger of needlessly dragging things out, as we have seen the waste of ending things before they have had the opportunity to reach their full potential in the past." Cornet praised Kevin's "truth bomb", writing that it "worked beautifully", but she called "the 'man behind the curtain' reveal ... a bitter disappointment" and a "cop-out" to engage the audience.

Brett Davinger of The California Literary Review called Brian's antics "creepy", and wondered if the character would begin to emulate the characteristics of the eighth season character Cathy, who attempted to cheat with Jim. He called the Jim and Darryl story filler, but was more positive about Oscar and Kevin's story, noting that the ending was "a short segment, but well done". Bonnie Stiernberg of Paste magazine wrote that the idea of Brian temporarily dividing Pam and Jim led to "one of the more out-of-the-box episodes" of the series. However, she felt that the writers should have "thought of [the idea] sometime last season" and that the concept seemed forced. Stiernberg paralleled the quick buildup to Pam and Brian's relationship unfavorably to the slow buildup of Pam and Jim's initial attraction to each other. Nick Campbell of TV.com wrote that "Vandalism"—along with "Junior Salesman"—was "so much sharper than last week's trial in Dullsville". He felt that the episode was "important", because it continued the plot involving Brian. Campbell initially was not pleased with the development, but said that the plot will be "the ultimate test of the show's romantic theory" that "the meek men (the proletariat) constantly and righteously upending the established and neglectful men (the bourgeoisie) in the lives of The Office's womenfolk".

Erik Adams of The A.V. Club awarded the episode a "C−" and largely criticized the introduction of Brian as a potential love interest for Pam. He was especially critical of the fight scene, saying Brian coming to Pam's rescue was an unnecessary contrivance, and that having Dwight in the role of Pam's defender would have been a more fitting resolution to the subplot. Adams, however, was complimentary towards Kevin's part in the episode, and called it a flash "of late-period Office at its very best". Casey Gillis of The News & Advance said the overall success of the ninth season of The Office was hurt by "Vandalism", as well as "Junior Salesman". She wrote that, while the episode "would have been enjoyable by" itself, after Brian defended Pam "the show sailed right over that shark".
