= 21st Satellite Awards =

US awards ceremony for film and television

- Date: February 19, 2017

Highlights
- Best film: La La Land (Major); Manchester by the Sea (Independent)
- Best television drama: The Crown
- Best television musical/comedy: Silicon Valley
- Best director: Kenneth Lonergan for Manchester by the Sea

The 21st Satellite Awards is an award ceremony honoring the year's outstanding performers, films, television shows, home videos and interactive media, presented by the International Press Academy.

The nominations were announced on November 28, 2016. The winners were announced on December 19, 2016. The ceremony took place on February 19, 2017.

The following day after the nominations were announced, the nominations for Master of None (Best Television Series – Musical or Comedy) and Laurie Metcalf (Best Actress in a Musical or Comedy Series for Getting On) were rescinded for being ineligible in 2016.

== Special achievement awards ==
- Auteur Award (for singular vision and unique artistic control over the elements of production) – Tom Ford
- Humanitarian Award (for making a difference in the lives of those in the artistic community and beyond) – Patrick Stewart
- Mary Pickford Award (for outstanding contribution to the entertainment industry) – Edward James Olmos
- Nikola Tesla Award (for visionary achievement in filmmaking technology) – John Toll
- Best First Feature – Rusudan Glurjidze (House of Others)

== Motion picture winners and nominees ==
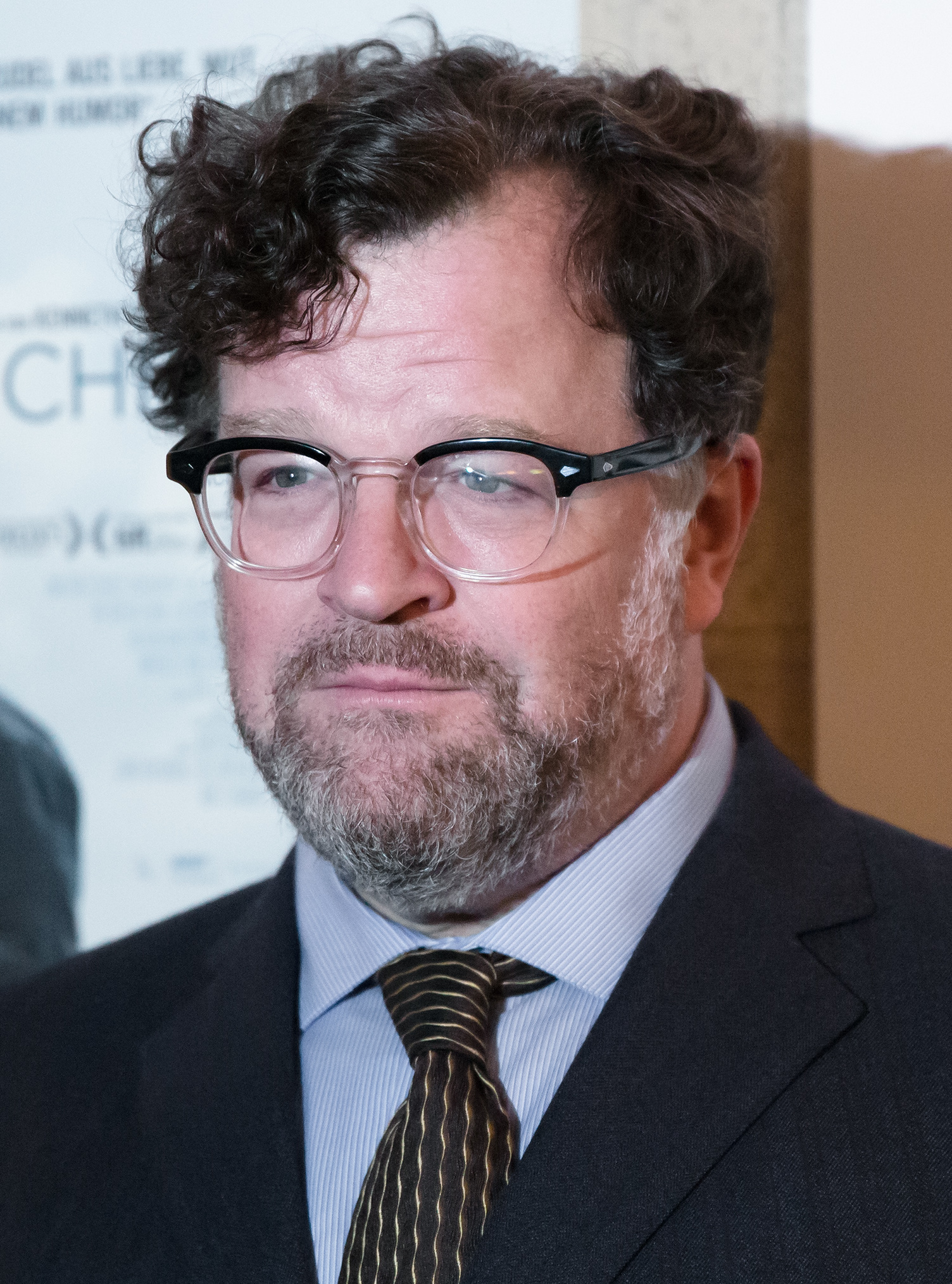
Kenneth Lonergan, Best Director winner

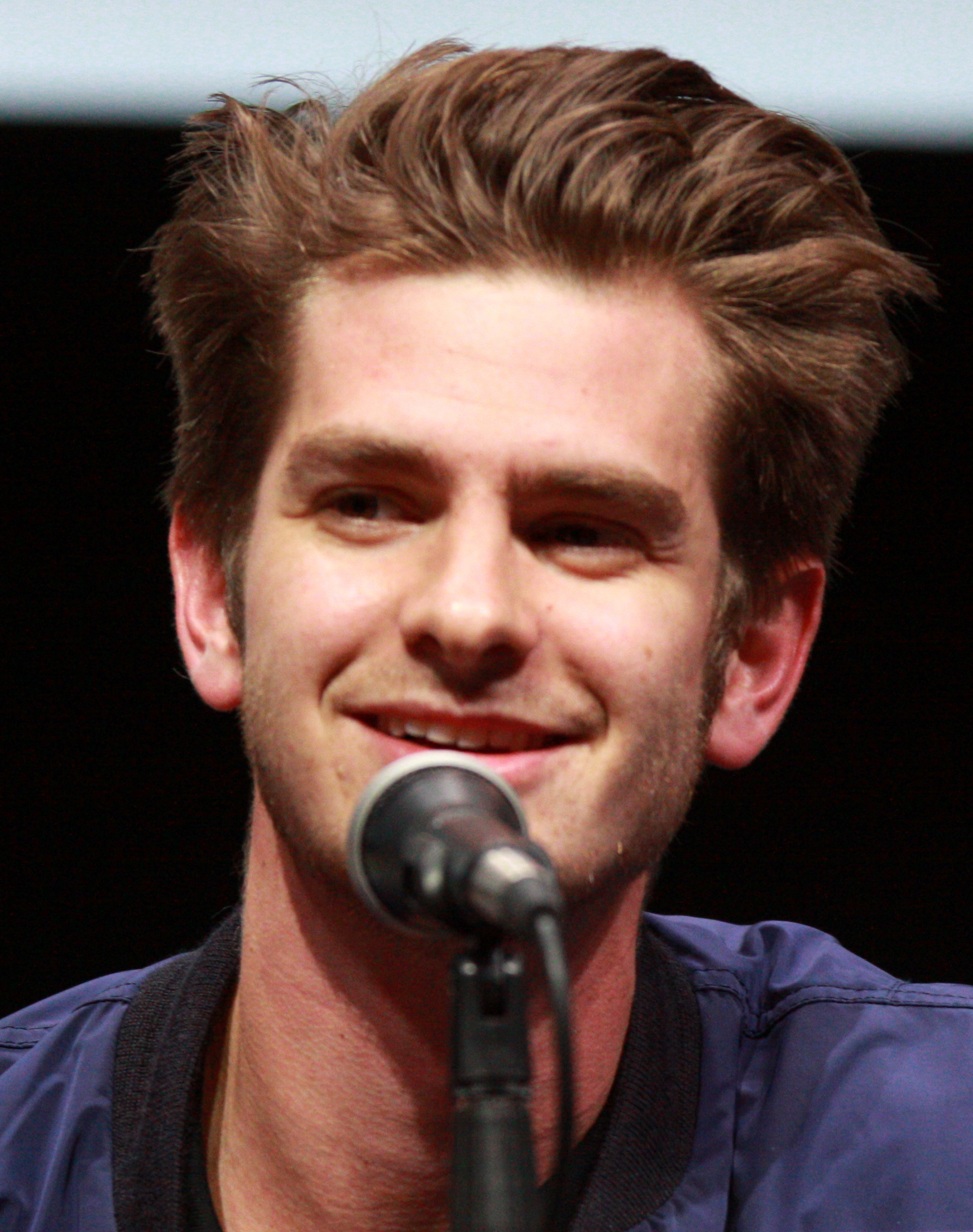
Andrew Garfield, Best Actor in a Motion Picture co-winner

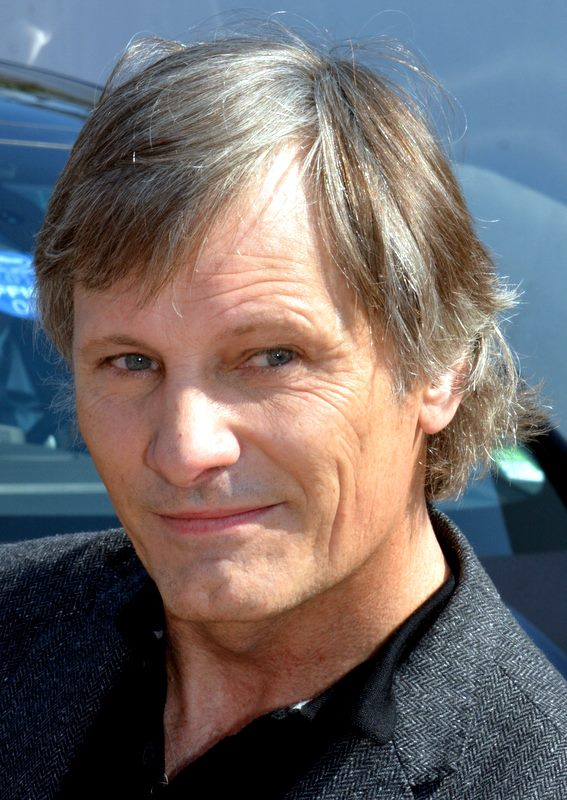
Viggo Mortensen, Best Actor in a Motion Picture co-winner

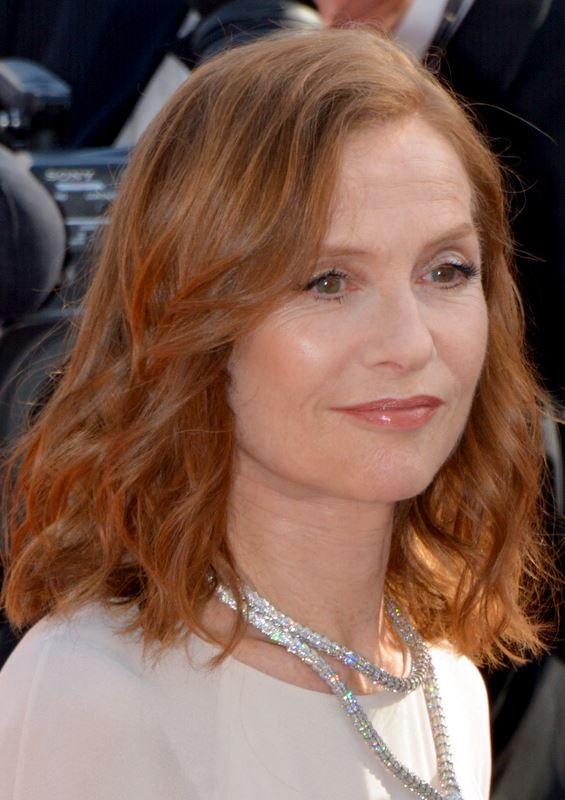
Isabelle Huppert, Best Actress in a Motion Picture co-winner

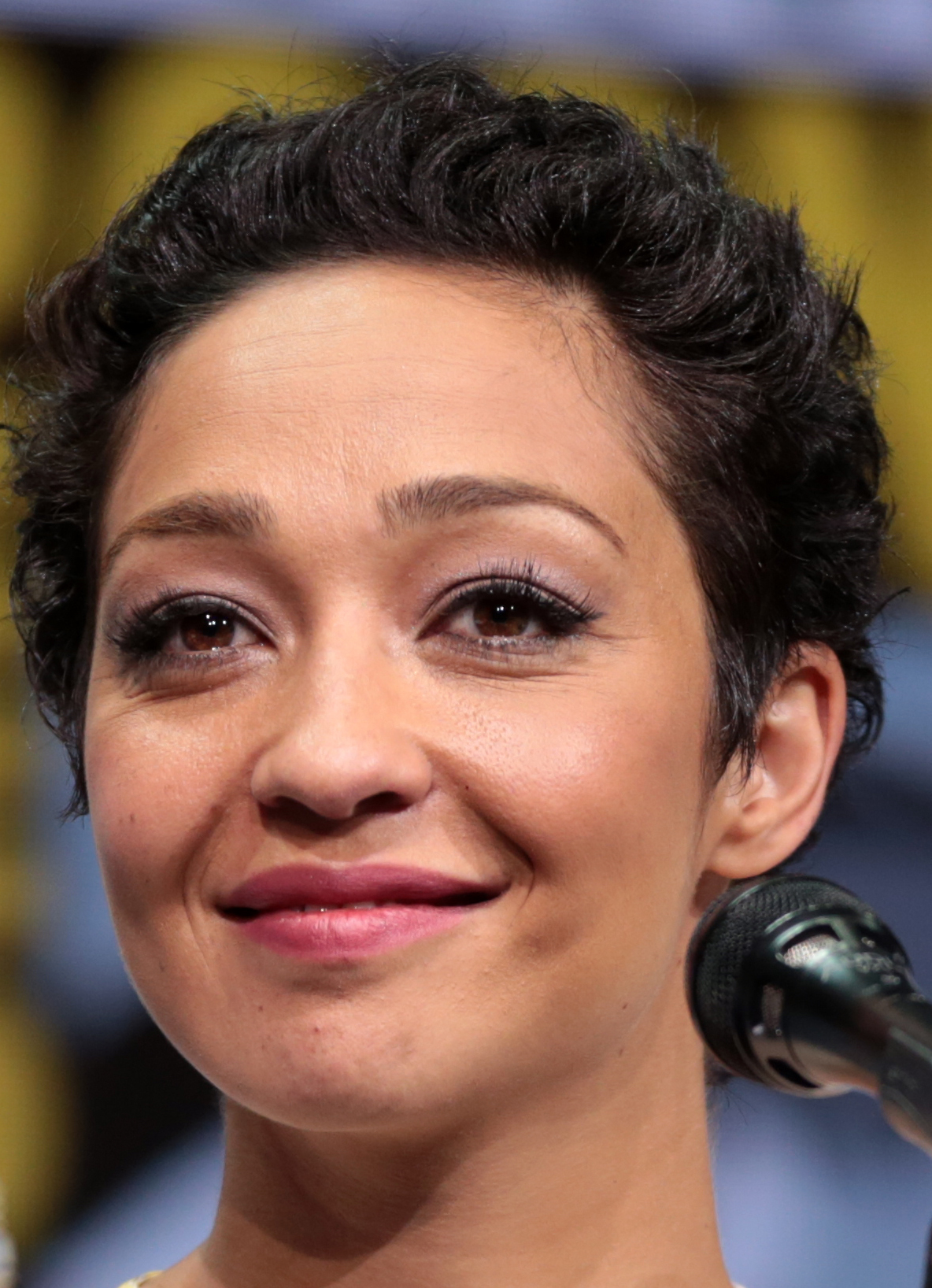
Ruth Negga, Best Actress in a Motion Picture co-winner

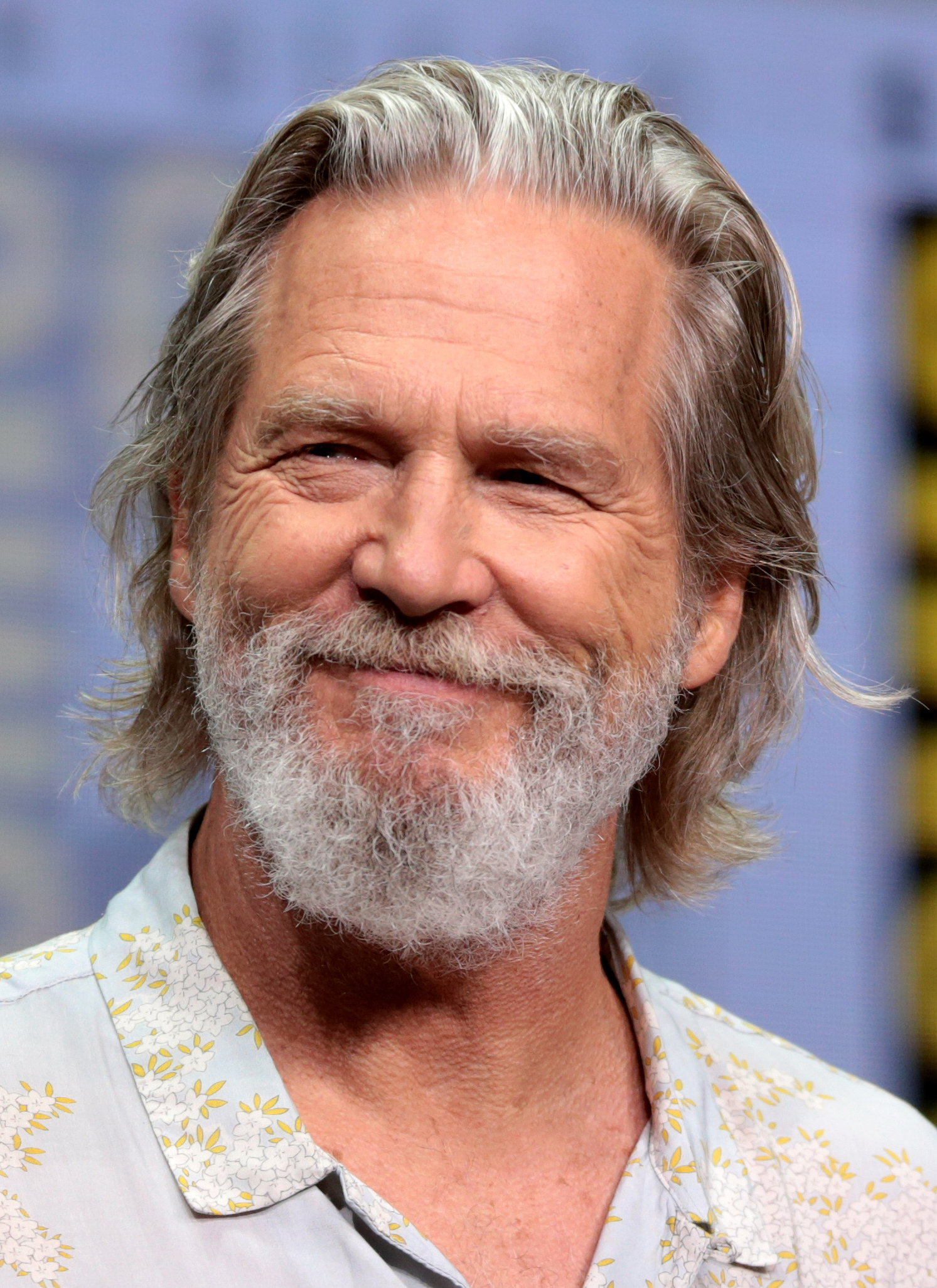
Jeff Bridges, Best Supporting Actor in a Motion Picture winner

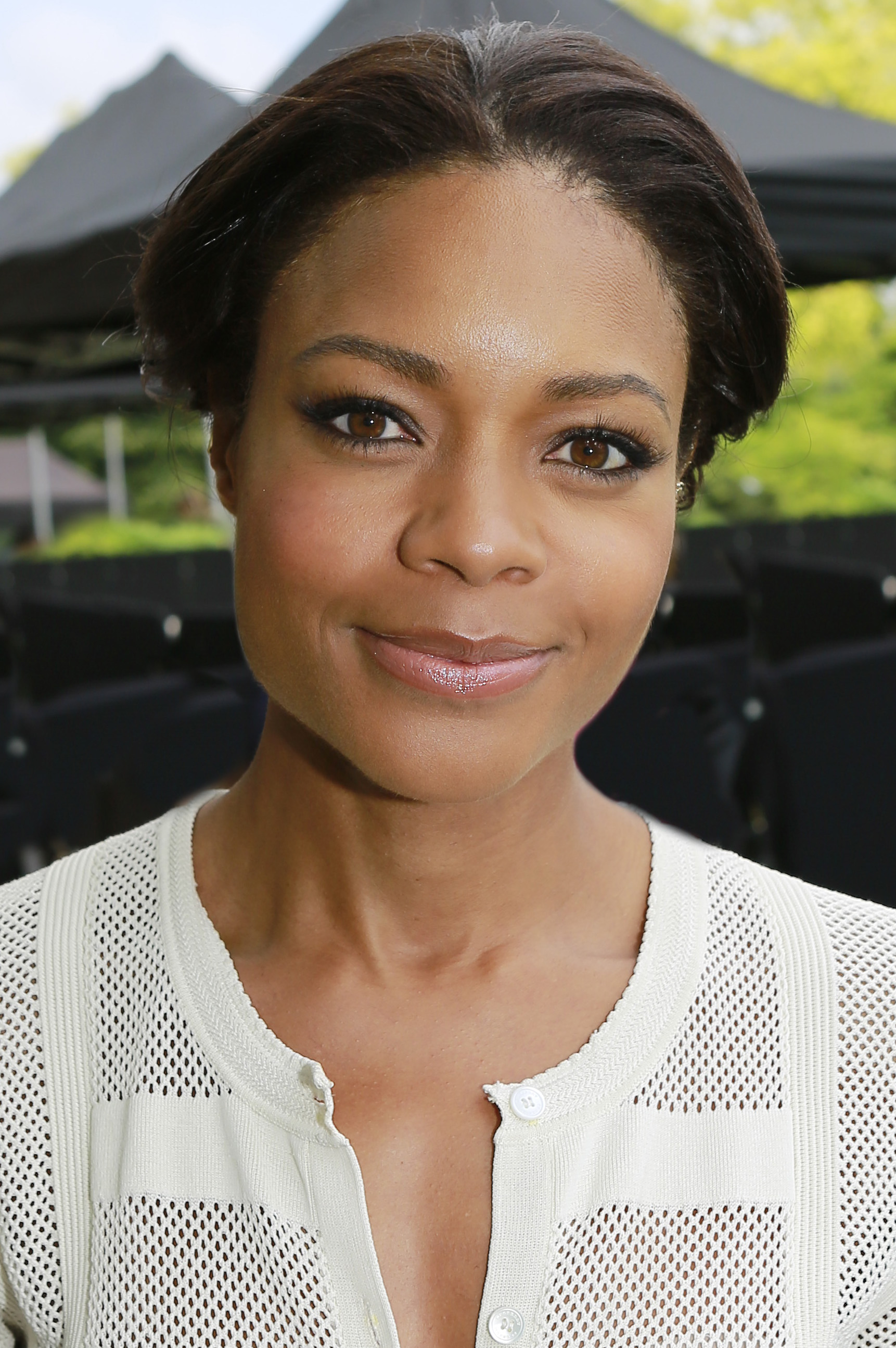
Naomie Harris, Best Supporting Actress in a Motion Picture winner

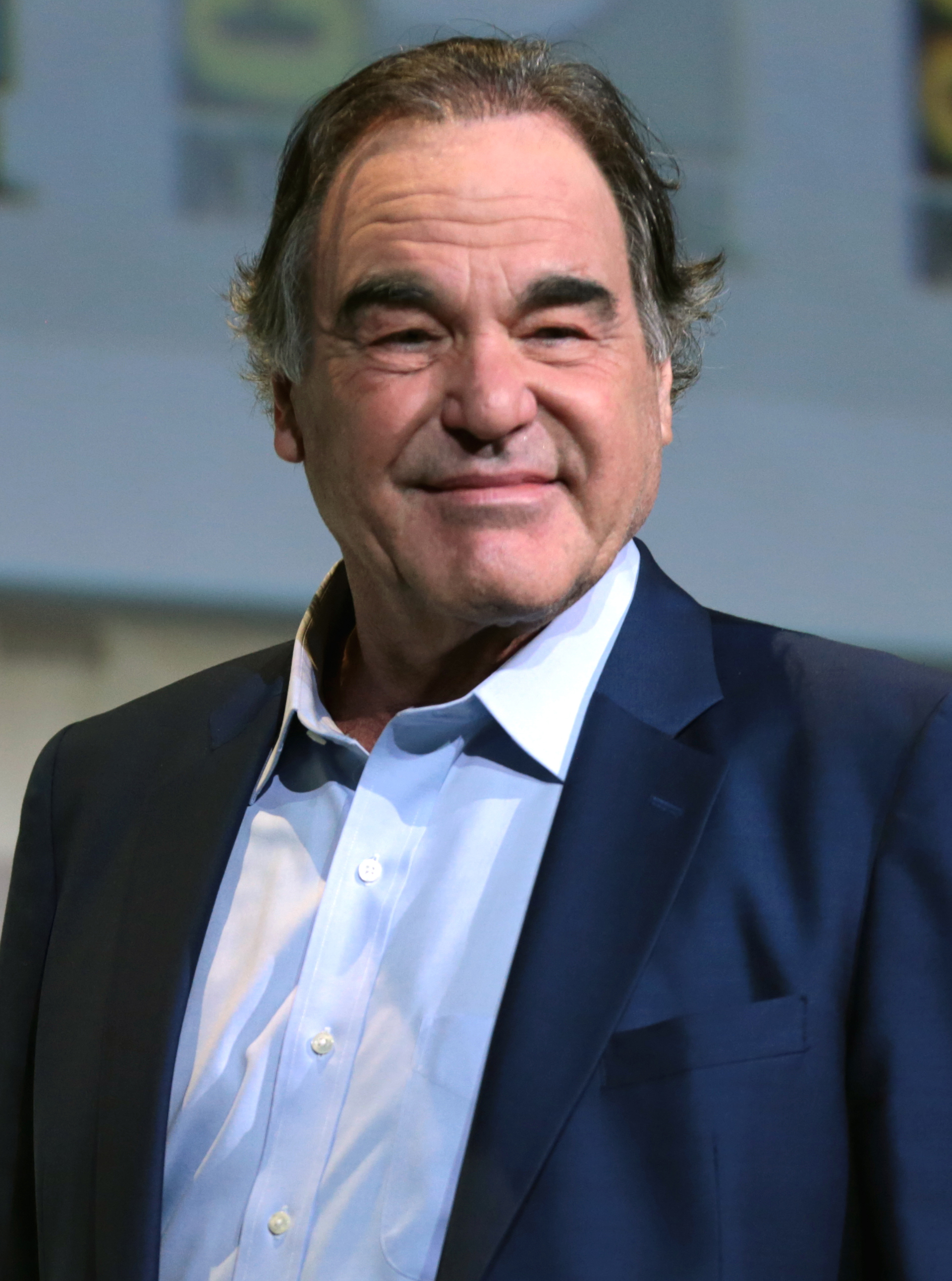
Oliver Stone, Best Adapted Screenplay co-winner

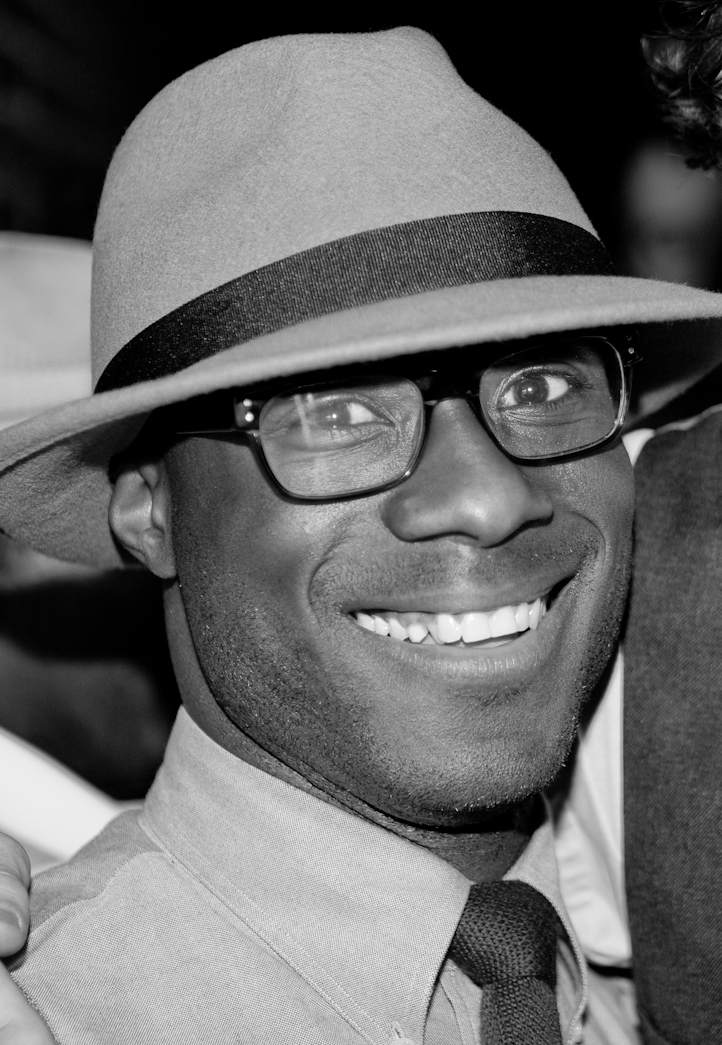
Barry Jenkins, Best Original Screenplay winner

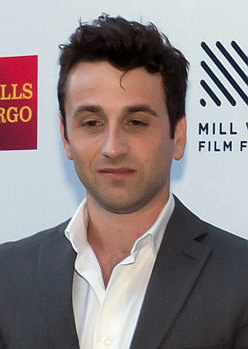
Justin Hurwitz, Best Original Score winner

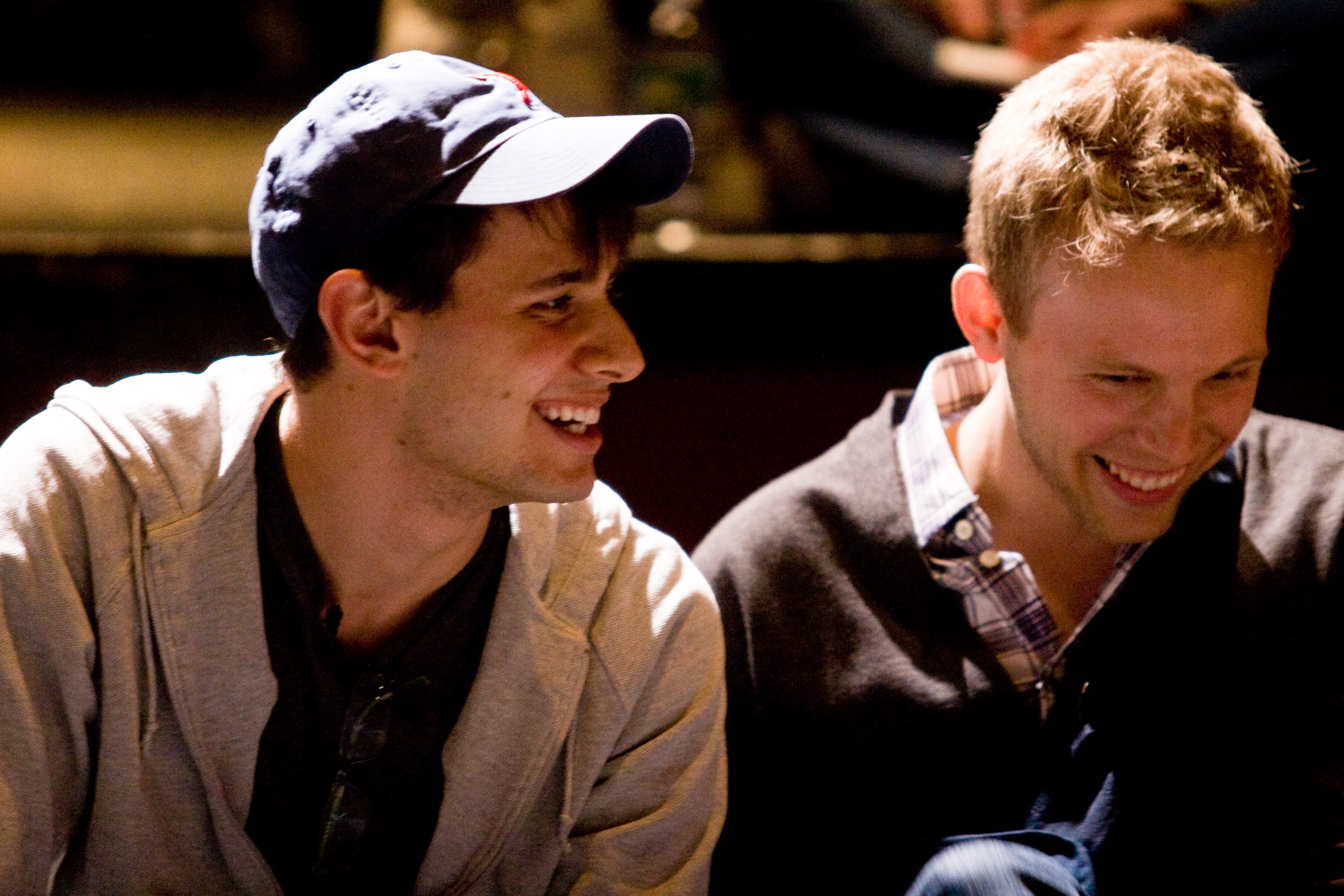
Benj Pasek and Justin Paul, Best Original Song winners

Winners are listed first and highlighted in bold.

Best Film	Best Director
**La La Land (Major)**; **Manchester by the Sea (Independent)**; Captain Fantastic; Fences; Hacksaw Ridge; Hell or High Water; Hidden Figures; Jackie; Lion; Loving; Moonlight; Nocturnal Animals	**Kenneth Lonergan – Manchester by the Sea**; Damien Chazelle – La La Land; Tom Ford – Nocturnal Animals; Mel Gibson – Hacksaw Ridge; Barry Jenkins – Moonlight; Pablo Larraín – Jackie; Denzel Washington – Fences
Best Actor	Best Actress
**Andrew Garfield – Hacksaw Ridge as Desmond Doss (Major)**; **Viggo Mortensen – Captain Fantastic as Ben Cash (Independent)**; Casey Affleck – Manchester by the Sea as Lee Chandler; Joel Edgerton – Loving as Richard Loving; Joseph Gordon-Levitt – Snowden as Edward Snowden; Ryan Gosling – La La Land as Sebastian Wilder; Tom Hanks – Sully as Chesley "Sully" Sullenberger; Denzel Washington – Fences as Troy Maxson	**Isabelle Huppert – Elle as Michèle Leblanc (Independent)**; **Ruth Negga – Loving as Mildred Loving (Major)**; Amy Adams – Nocturnal Animals as Susan Morrow; Annette Bening – 20th Century Women as Dorothea Fields; Taraji P. Henson – Hidden Figures as Katherine Goble Johnson; Natalie Portman – Jackie as Jacqueline "Jackie" Kennedy; Emma Stone – La La Land as Amelia "Mia" Dolan; Meryl Streep – Florence Foster Jenkins as Florence Foster Jenkins
Best Supporting Actor	Best Supporting Actress
**Jeff Bridges – Hell or High Water as Marcus Hamilton**; Mahershala Ali – Moonlight as Juan; Hugh Grant – Florence Foster Jenkins as St. Clair Bayfield; Lucas Hedges – Manchester by the Sea as Patrick Chandler; Eddie Murphy – Mr. Church as Henry Joseph Church; Dev Patel – Lion as Saroo Brierley	**Naomie Harris – Moonlight as Paula**; Viola Davis – Fences as Rose Maxson; Nicole Kidman – Lion as Sue Brierley; Helen Mirren – Eye in the Sky as Katherine Powell; Octavia Spencer – Hidden Figures as Dorothy Vaughan; Michelle Williams – Manchester by the Sea as Randi
Best Original Screenplay	Best Adapted Screenplay
**Moonlight – Barry Jenkins**; Captain Fantastic – Matt Ross; Hell or High Water – Taylor Sheridan; La La Land – Damien Chazelle; The Lobster – Efthimis Filippou and Yorgos Lanthimos; Manchester by the Sea – Kenneth Lonergan	**Snowden – Kieran Fitzgerald and Oliver Stone**; Hacksaw Ridge – Andrew Knight and Robert Schenkkan; Hidden Figures – Theodore Melfi and Allison Schroeder; The Jungle Book – Justin Marks; Lion – Luke Davies; Sully – Todd Komarnicki
Best Animated or Mixed Media Film	Best Foreign Language Film
**My Life as a Zucchini**; Finding Dory; The Jungle Book; Kubo and the Two Strings; Miss Hokusai; Moana; The Red Turtle; Trolls; Your Name; Zootopia	**The Salesman (Iran)**; The Ardennes (Belgium); Elle (France); The Handmaiden (South Korea); The Happiest Day in the Life of Olli Mäki (Finland); Julieta (Spain); A Man Called Ove (Sweden); Ma' Rosa (Philippines); Paradise (Russia); Toni Erdmann (Germany)
Best Documentary Film	Best Cinematography
**13th**; The Beatles: Eight Days a Week; The Eagle Huntress; Fire at Sea; Gleason; The Ivory Game; Life, Animated; O.J.: Made in America; Tower; Zero Days	**The Jungle Book – Bill Pope**; Billy Lynn's Long Halftime Walk – John Toll; Hacksaw Ridge – Simon Duggan; The Happiest Day in the Life of Olli Mäki – Jani-Petteri Passi; La La Land – Linus Sandgren; Moonlight – James Laxton
Best Original Score	Best Original Song
**La La Land – Justin Hurwitz**; The BFG – John Williams; Hacksaw Ridge – Rupert Gregson-Williams; Hidden Figures – Hans Zimmer, Pharrell Williams, and Benjamin Wallfisch; The Jungle Book – John Debney; Manchester by the Sea – Lesley Barber	**"City of Stars" – La La Land**; "Audition (The Fools Who Dream)" – La La Land; "Can't Stop the Feeling!" – Trolls; "Dancing With Your Shadow" – A Boy Called Po; "I'm Still Here" – Miss Sharon Jones!; "Running" – Hidden Figures
Best Visual Effects	Best Art Direction and Production Design
**The Jungle Book**; The BFG; Billy Lynn's Long Halftime Walk; Deadpool; Doctor Strange; Sully	**La La Land – David Wasco**; Alice Through the Looking Glass – Dan Hennah; Allied – Gary Freeman; Hacksaw Ridge – Barry Robinson; Jackie – Jean Rabasse; The Jungle Book – Christophe Glass
Best Film Editing	Best Sound (Editing and Mixing)
**Hacksaw Ridge – John Gilbert**; Billy Lynn's Long Halftime Walk – Tim Squyres; The Birth of a Nation – Steven Rosenblum; La La Land – Tom Cross; Lion – Alexandre de Franceschi; Moonlight – Joi McMillon and Nat Sanders	**Hacksaw Ridge**; 13 Hours: The Secret Soldiers of Benghazi; Allied; Billy Lynn's Long Halftime Walk; The Jungle Book; La La Land
Best Costume Design	Best Ensemble – Motion Picture
**Jackie – Madeline Fontaine**; Alice Through the Looking Glass – Colleen Atwood; Captain Fantastic – Courtney Hoffman; Doctor Strange – Alexandra Byrne; La La Land – Mary Zophres; Love & Friendship – Eimer Ní Mhaoldomhnaigh	**Hidden Figures – Mahershala Ali, Kevin Costner, Kirsten Dunst,** **Taraji P. Henson, Karan Kendrick, Janelle Monáe, Jim Parsons,** **Glen Powell, and Octavia Spencer**

=== Films with multiple nominations ===
Nominations	Film
13	La La Land
8	Hacksaw Ridge
7	The Jungle Book
7	Manchester by the Sea
6	Hidden Figures
6	Moonlight
5	Jackie
5	Lion
4	Billy Lynn's Long Halftime Walk
4	Captain Fantastic
4	Fences
3	Hell or High Water
3	Loving
3	Nocturnal Animals
3	Sully
2	Allied
2	The BFG
2	Doctor Strange
2	Florence Foster Jenkins
2	Snowden
2	Trolls

=== Films with multiple wins ===
Wins	Film
4	La La Land
3	Hacksaw Ridge
2	The Jungle Book
2	Manchester by the Sea
2	Moonlight

== Television winners and nominees ==
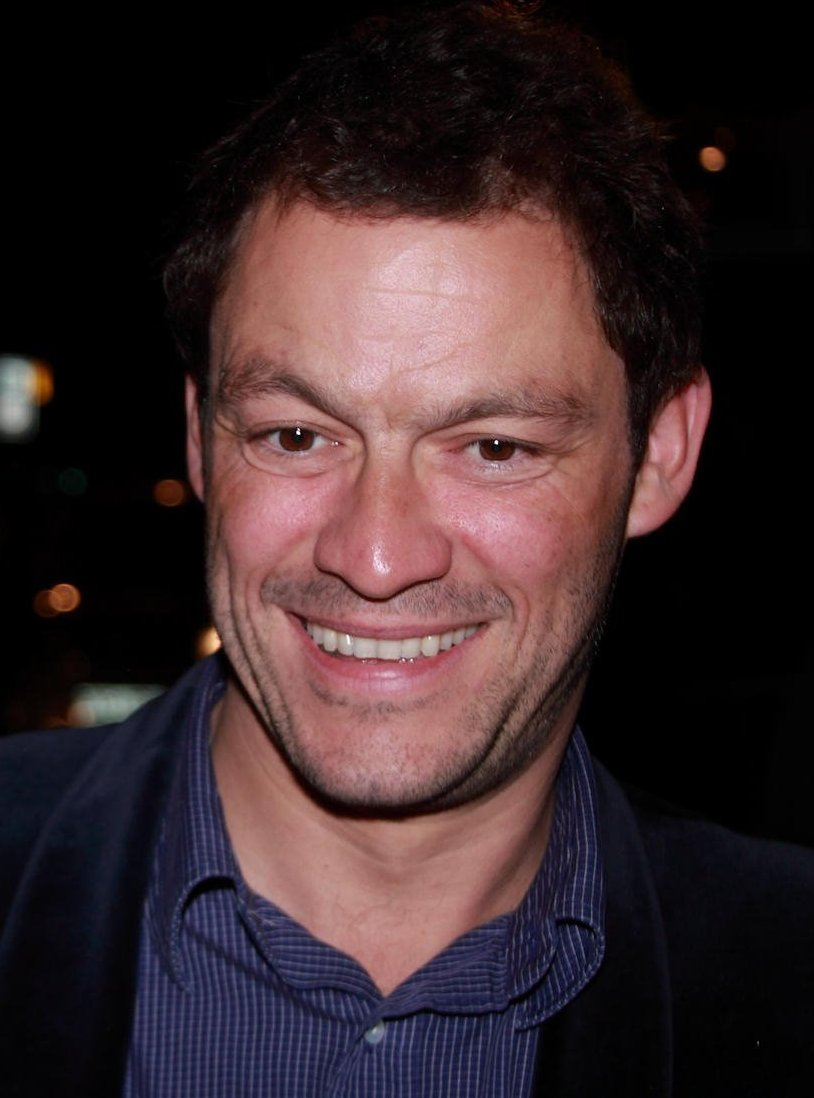
Dominic West, Best Actor in a Drama / Genre Series winner

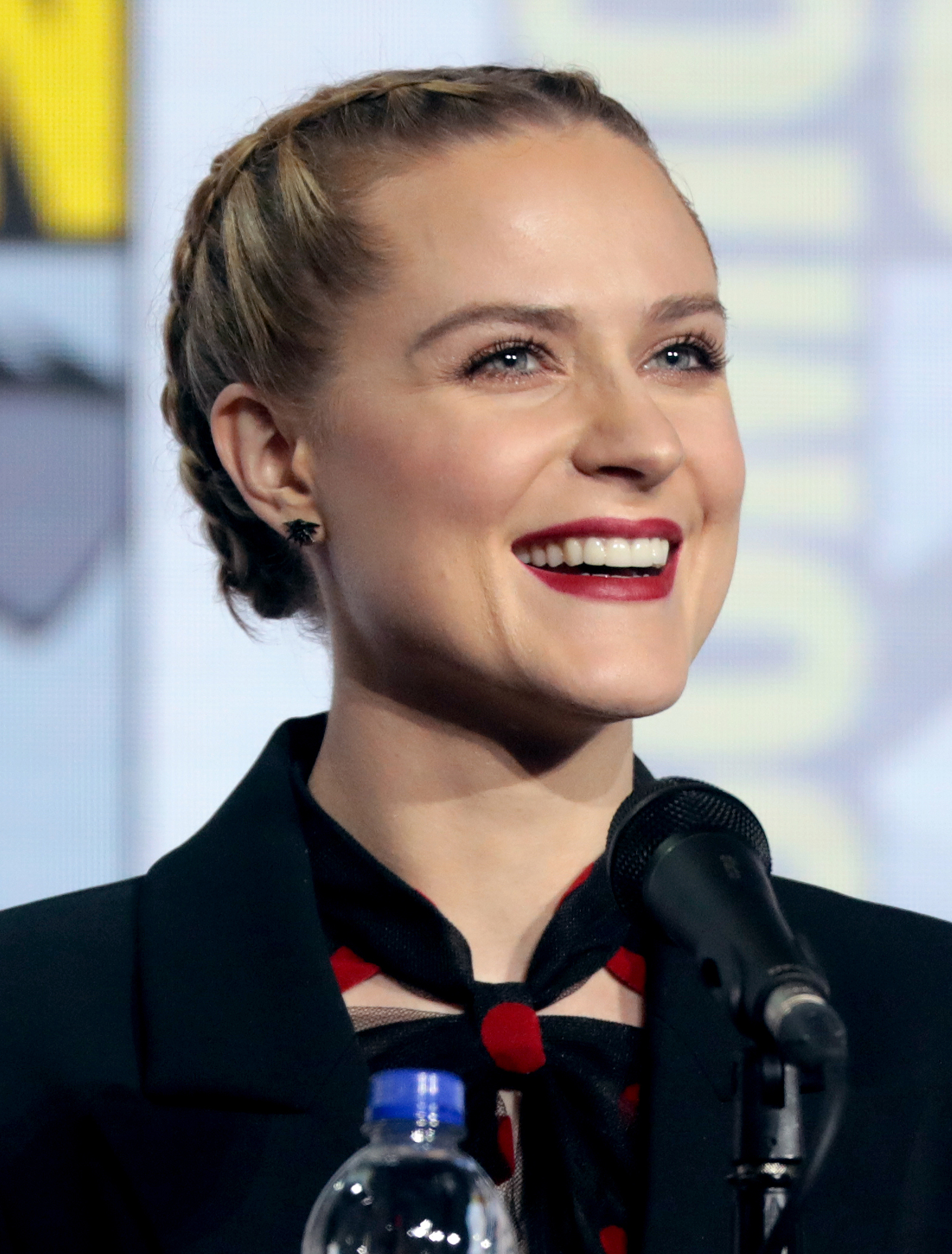
Evan Rachel Wood, Best Actress in a Drama / Genre Series winner

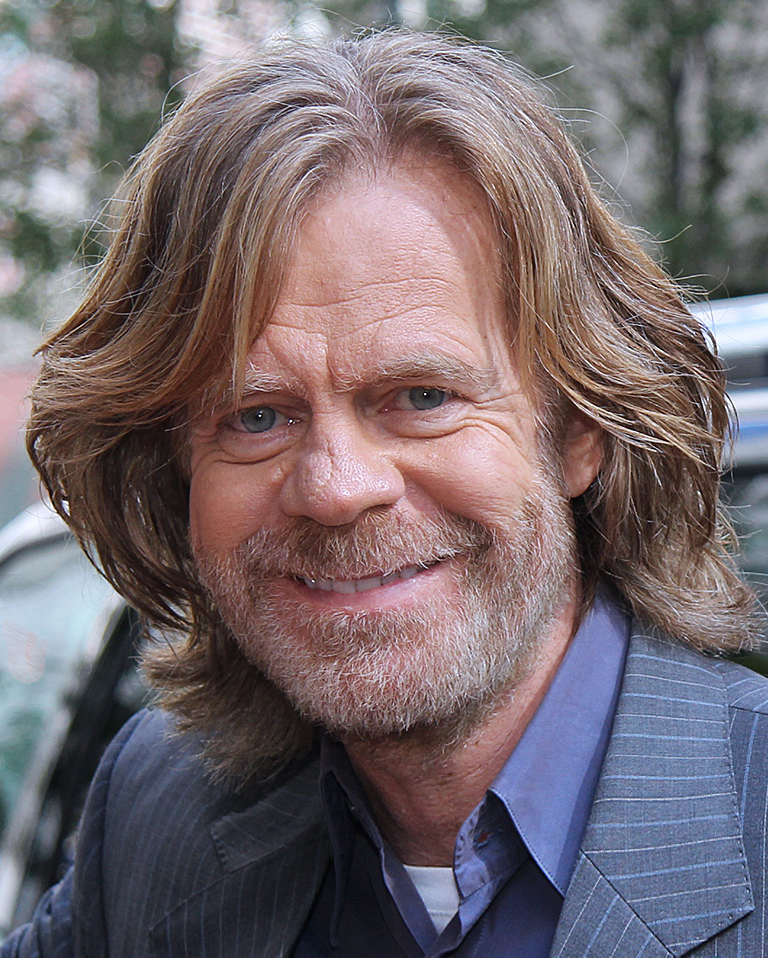
William H. Macy, Best Actor in a Comedy or Musical Series winner

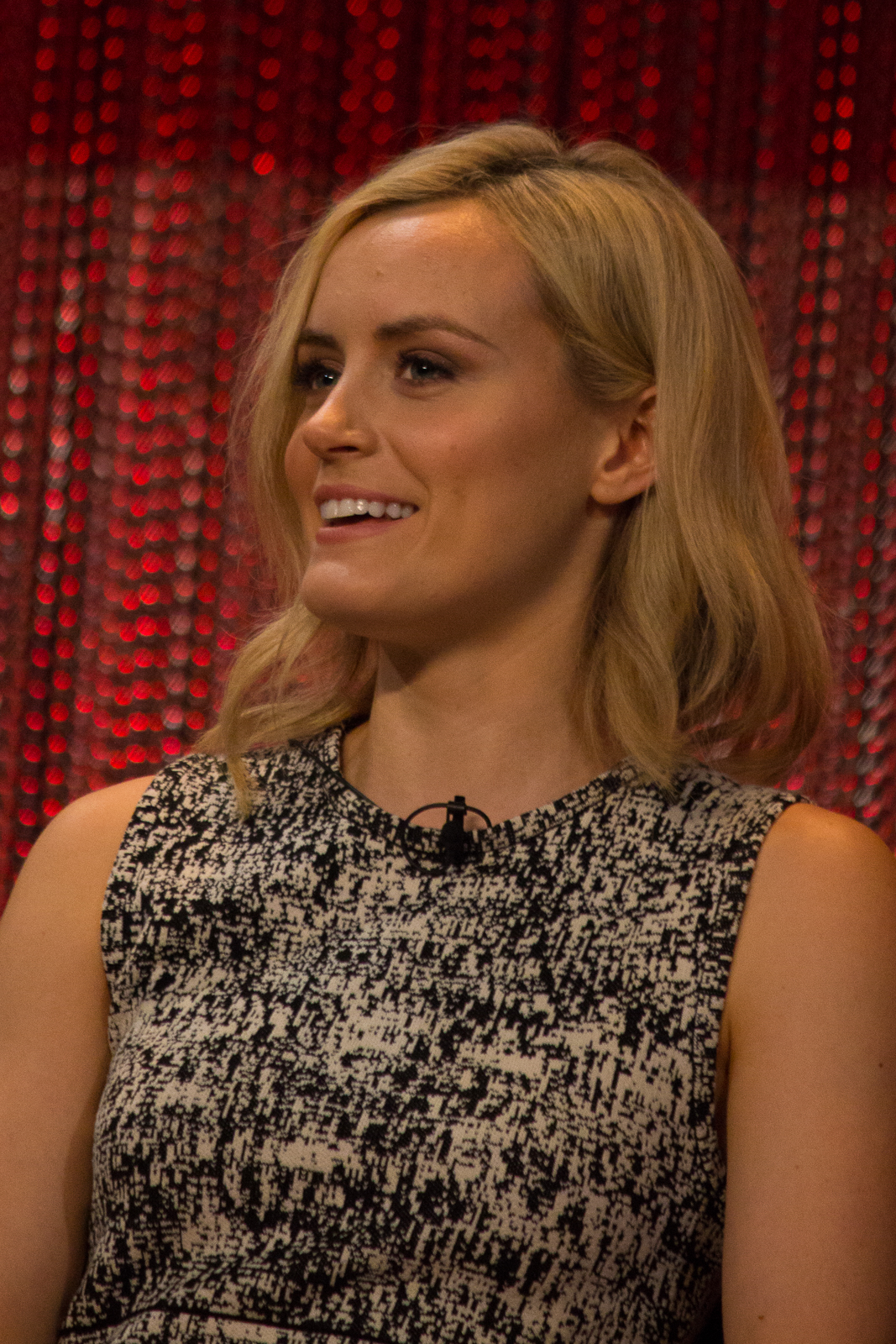
Taylor Schilling, Best Actress in a Comedy or Musical Series winner

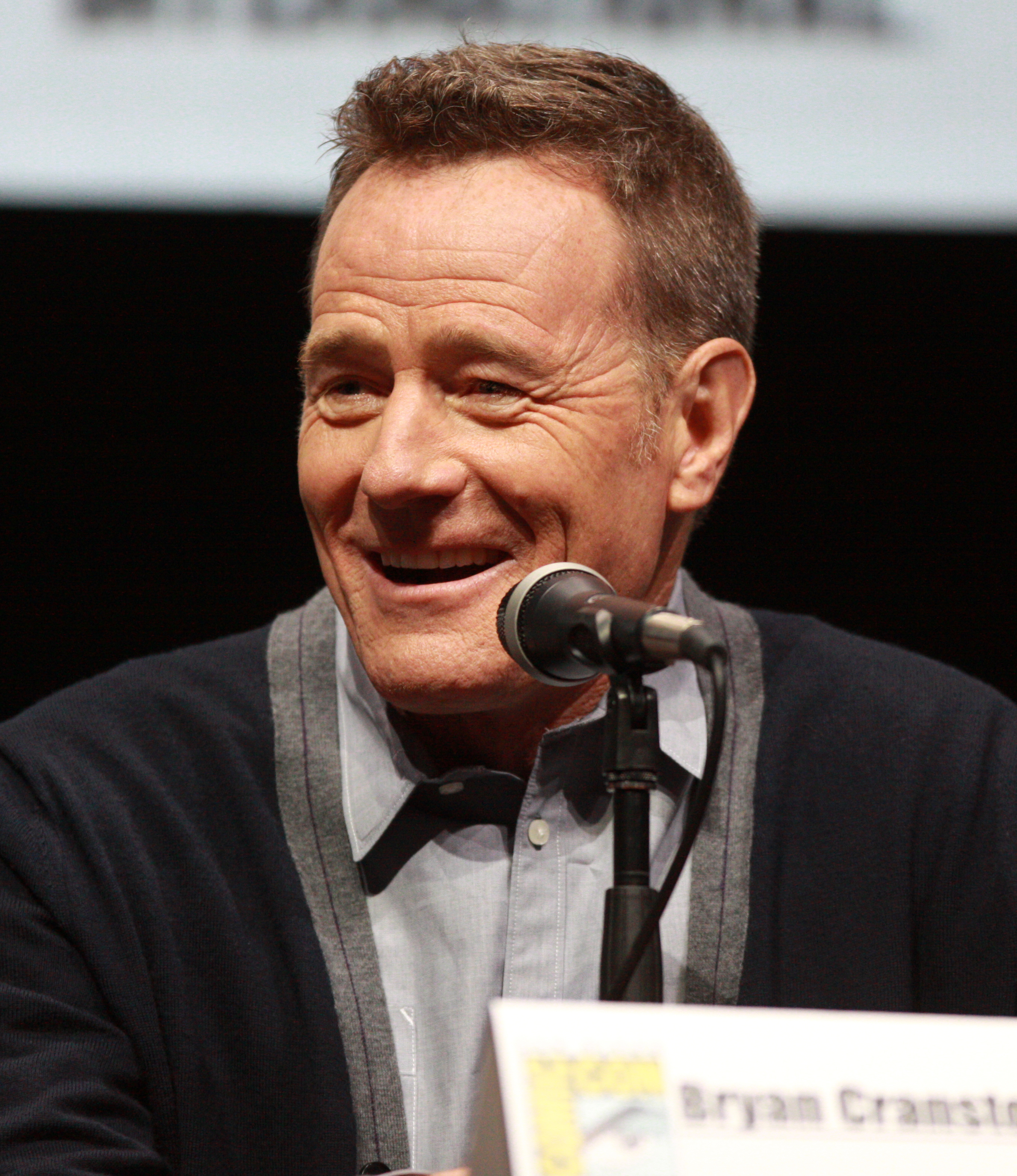
Bryan Cranston, Best Actor in a Miniseries or Television Film winner

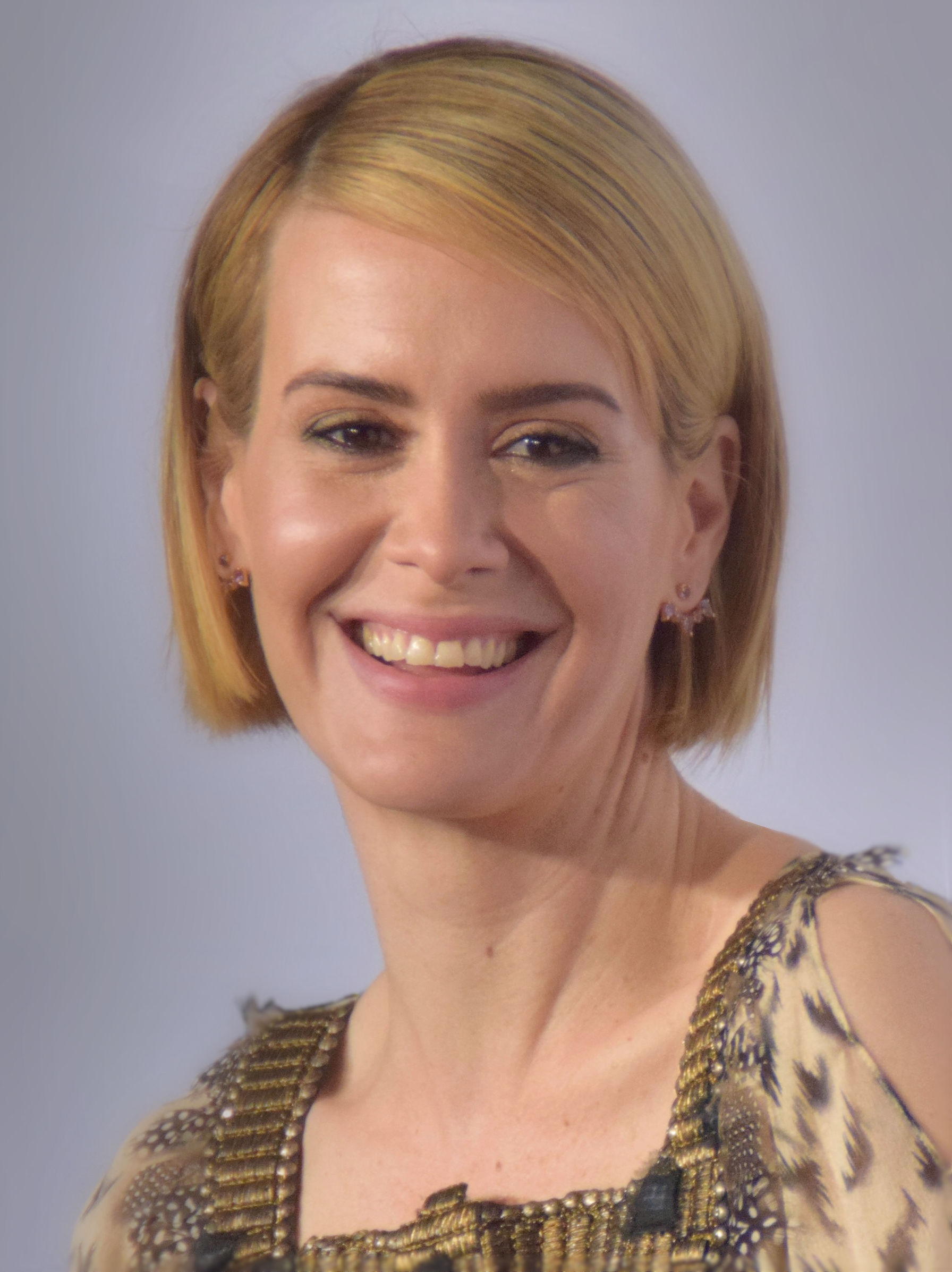
Sarah Paulson, Best Actress in a Miniseries or Television Film winner

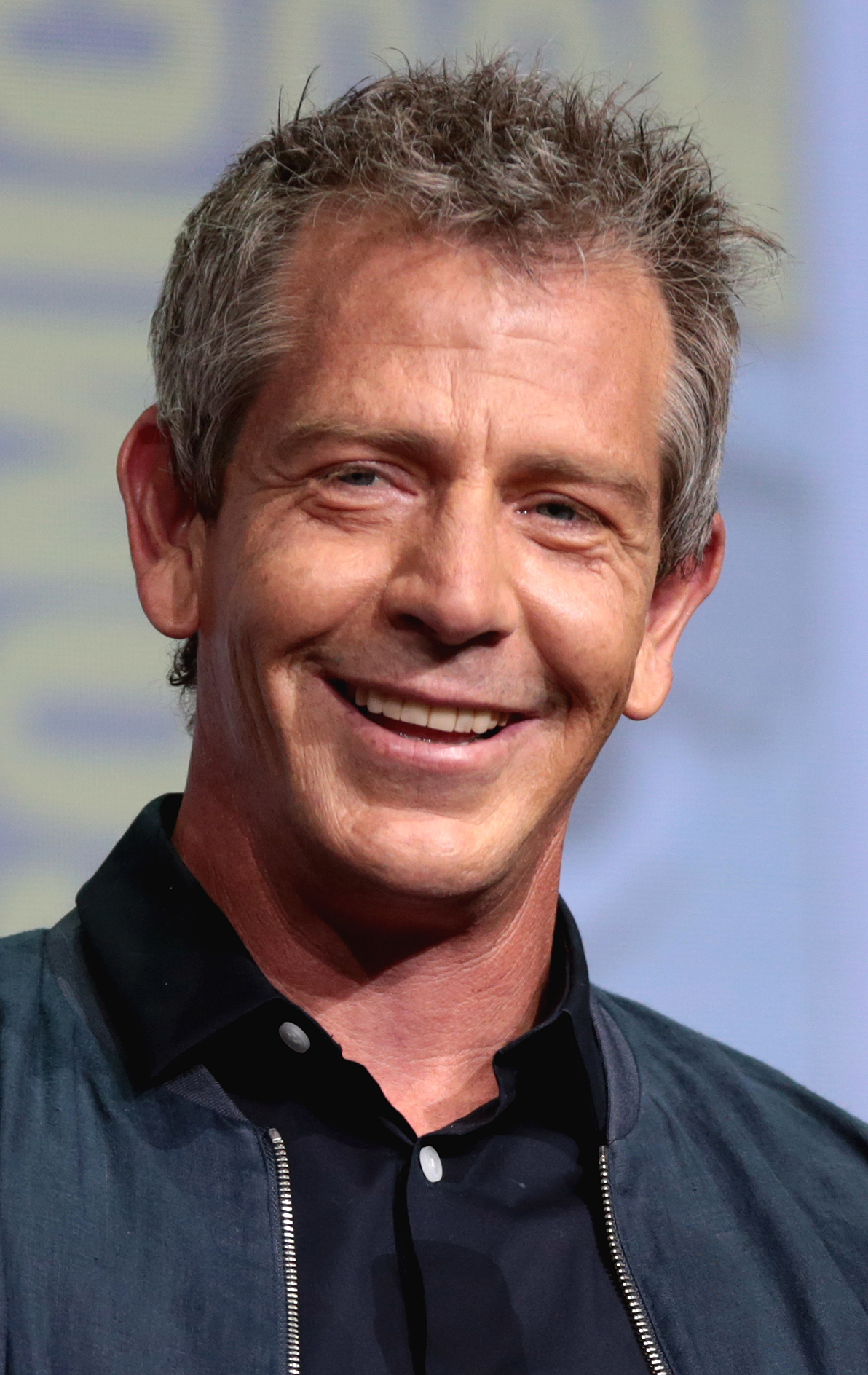
Ben Mendelsohn, Best Supporting Actor in a Series, Miniseries, or Television Film winner

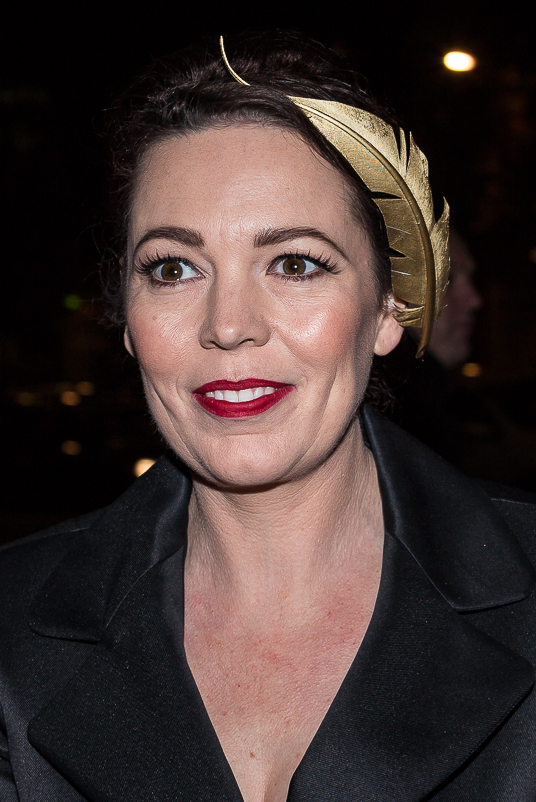
Olivia Colman, Best Supporting Actress in a Series, Miniseries, or Television Film co-winner

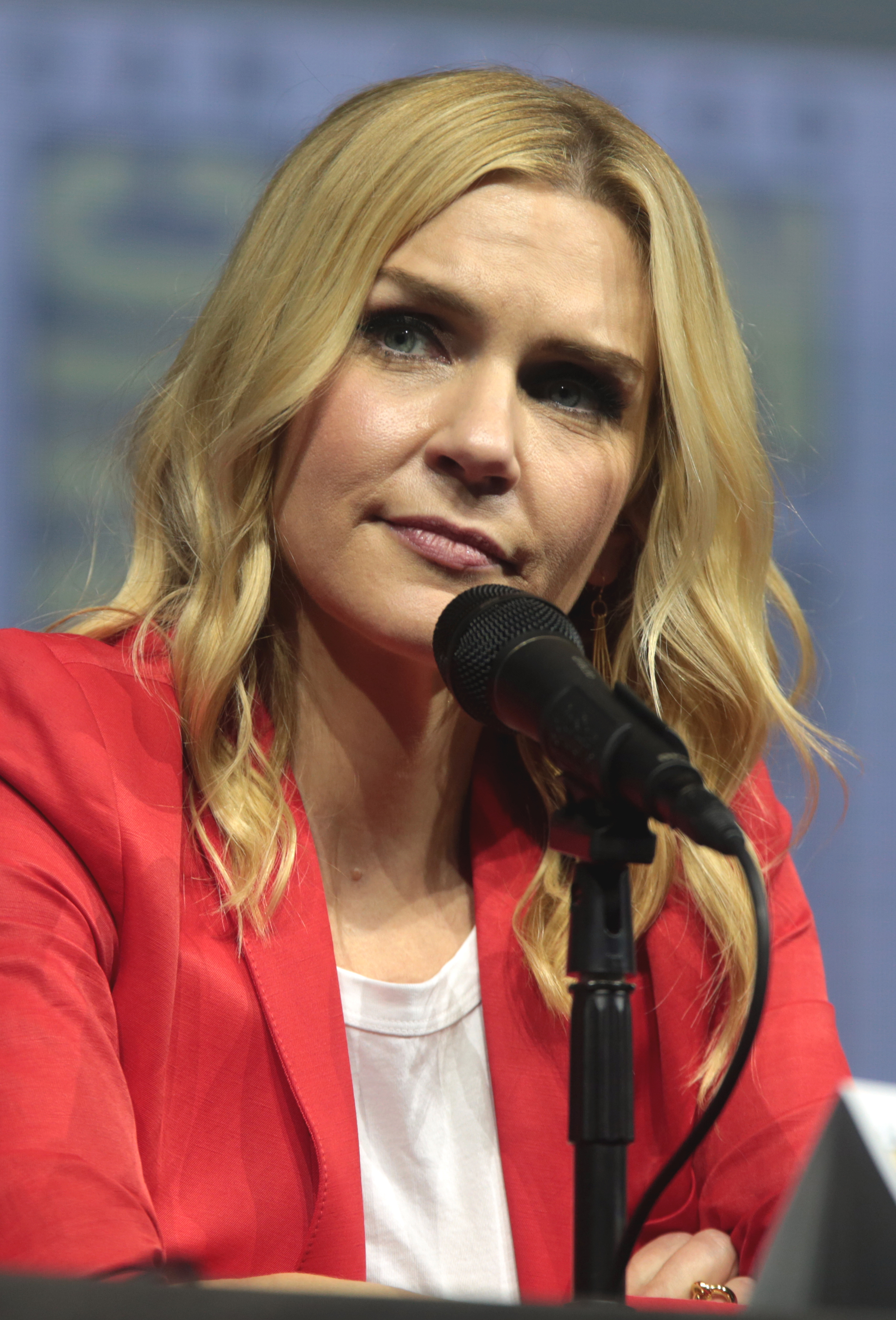
Rhea Seehorn, Best Supporting Actress in a Series, Miniseries, or Television Film co-winner

Winners are listed first and highlighted in bold.

Best Drama Series	Best Musical or Comedy Series
**The Crown – Netflix**; The Affair – Showtime; American Crime – ABC; The Americans – FX; Better Call Saul – AMC; The Fall – BBC Two / Netflix; Mr. Robot – USA Network; Poldark – PBS	**Silicon Valley – HBO**; Brooklyn Nine-Nine – Fox; Lady Dynamite – Netflix; Love – Netflix; Orange Is the New Black – Netflix; Unbreakable Kimmy Schmidt – Netflix; Veep – HBO
Best Genre Series	Best Miniseries or Television Film
**Outlander – Starz**; Black Mirror – Netflix; Game of Thrones – HBO; The Man in the High Castle – Amazon Prime Video; Orphan Black – BBC America; Stranger Things – Netflix; The Walking Dead – AMC; Westworld – HBO	**The People v. O. J. Simpson: American Crime Story – FX**; All the Way – HBO; And Then There Were None – Acorn TV; Churchill's Secret – PBS; Close to the Enemy – Acorn TV; Confirmation – HBO; The Dresser – Starz; Lady Day at Emerson's Bar and Grill – HBO; The Night Of – HBO
Best Actor in a Drama / Genre Series	Best Actress in a Drama / Genre Series
**Dominic West – The Affair as Noah Solloway**; Rami Malek – Mr. Robot as Elliot Alderson; Bob Odenkirk – Better Call Saul as Jimmy McGill; Matthew Rhys – The Americans as Philip Jennings; Liev Schreiber – Ray Donovan as Ray Donovan; Billy Bob Thornton – Goliath as Billy McBride	**Evan Rachel Wood – Westworld as Dolores Abernathy**; Felicity Huffman – American Crime as Leslie Graham; Sarah Lancashire – Happy Valley as Sgt. Catherine Cawood; Tatiana Maslany – Orphan Black as Various Characters; Winona Ryder – Stranger Things as Joyce Byers; Ruth Wilson – The Affair as Alison Lockhart
Best Actor in a Musical or Comedy Series	Best Actress in a Musical or Comedy Series
**William H. Macy – Shameless as Frank Gallagher**; Anthony Anderson – Black-ish as Andre "Dre" Johnson Sr.; Rob Delaney – Catastrophe as Rob Norris; Will Forte – The Last Man on Earth as Phil Miller; Thomas Middleditch – Silicon Valley as Richard Hendricks; Jeffrey Tambor – Transparent as Maura Pfefferman	**Taylor Schilling – Orange Is the New Black as Piper Chapman**; Pamela Adlon – Better Things as Sam Fox; Sharon Horgan – Catastrophe as Sharon Morris; Ellie Kemper – Unbreakable Kimmy Schmidt as Kimmy Schmidt; Tracee Ellis Ross – Black-ish as Dr. Rainbow "Bow" Johnson
Best Actor in a Miniseries or TV Film	Best Actress in a Miniseries or TV Film
**Bryan Cranston – All the Way as Lyndon B. Johnson**; Cuba Gooding Jr. – The People v. O. J. Simpson: American Crime Story as O. J. Simpson; Tom Hiddleston – The Night Manager as Jonathan Pine; Anthony Hopkins – The Dresser as Sir; Wendell Pierce – Confirmation as Clarence Thomas; Courtney B. Vance – The People v. O. J. Simpson: American Crime Story as Johnnie Cochran	**Sarah Paulson – The People v. O. J. Simpson: American Crime Story as Marcia Clark**; Lily James – War & Peace as Natasha Rostova; Melissa Leo – All the Way as Lady Bird Johnson; Audra McDonald – Lady Day at Emerson's Bar and Grill as Billie Holiday; Kerry Washington – Confirmation as Anita Hill; Emily Watson – The Dresser as Her Ladyship
Best Supporting Actor in a Series, Miniseries or TV Film	Best Supporting Actress in a Series, Miniseries or TV Film
**Ben Mendelsohn – Bloodline as Danny Rayburn**; Jonathan Banks – Better Call Saul as Mike Ehrmantraut; Andre Braugher – Brooklyn Nine-Nine as Captain Raymond Holt; Jared Harris – The Crown as King George VI; Michael Kelly – House of Cards as Doug Stamper; Hugh Laurie – The Night Manager as Richard Onslow Roper	**Olivia Colman – The Night Manager as Angela Burr (TIE)**; **Rhea Seehorn – Better Call Saul as Kim Wexler (TIE)**; Lena Headey – Game of Thrones as Cersei Lannister; Maggie Siff – Billions as Wendy Rhoades, M.D.; Maura Tierney – The Affair as Helen Solloway; Alison Wright – The Americans as Martha Hanson
Best Ensemble – Television Series
**Outlander (Starz) – Caitriona Balfe, Simon Callow, Steven Cree, Rosie Day, Frances de la Tour, Laura Donnelly, Andrew Gower, Sam Heughan, Nell Hudson, Gary Lewis, Graham McTavish, Tobias Menzies, Dominique Pinon, Grant O'Rourke, Richard Rankin, Clive Russell, Sophie Skelton, Lotte Verbeek, Stephen Walters, and Stanley Weber**

=== Series with multiple nominations ===
Nominations	Series
4	The Affair
4	The People v. O. J. Simpson: American Crime Story
3	All the Way
3	The Americans
3	Better Call Saul
3	Confirmation
3	The Dresser
2	American Crime
2	Black-ish
2	Brooklyn Nine-Nine
2	The Crown
2	Game of Thrones
2	Lady Day at Emerson's Bar and Grill
2	Mr. Robot
2	The Night Manager
2	Orange Is the New Black
2	Orphan Black
2	Outlander
2	Silicon Valley
2	Stranger Things
2	Unbreakable Kimmy Schmidt
2	Westworld

=== Series with multiple wins ===
Wins	Series
2	Outlander
2	The People v. O. J. Simpson: American Crime Story

== New Media winners and nominees ==
Outstanding Sports Game	Outstanding Action/Adventure Game
NHL 17 – (EA Canada); FIFA 17 – (EA Bucharest / EA Canada); Mario & Sonic at the Rio 2016 Olympic Games – (Arzest / Sega Sports R&D); MLB The Show 16 – (San Diego Studio); Pro Evolution Soccer 2017 – (Konami / PES Productions)	Dark Souls III – (FromSoftware); Battlefield 1 – (EA Digital Illusions CE); Dishonored 2 – (Arkane Studios); Overwatch – (Blizzard Entertainment); Titanfall 2 – (Respawn Entertainment)
Outstanding Mobile Game	Outstanding Blu-ray
Mini Metro – (Dinosaur Polo Club); The Banner Saga 2 – (Stoic); FIFA Mobile – (EA Canada / EA Mobile); Komrad – (Sentient Play LLC); Retsnom – (Magic Cube)	Outlander; Batman v Superman: Dawn of Justice; Deadpool; Star Trek Beyond; Star Wars: The Force Awakens
