= Satellite Award for Outstanding New Talent =

Annual film award

The Satellite Award for Outstanding New Talent was a special achievement award given by the International Press Academy between 1996 and 2012.

After the retirement of the Outstanding New Talent Award in 2012, a similar award was given as a Breakthrough Performance Award in 2013. In addition, a special achievement Satellite Award was awarded for Best First Feature in 2011, 2016, and 2017.

== Winners ==
=== Outstanding New Talent ===
Year	Winner	Film
1996	Arie Verveen	Caught
1997	Aaron Eckhart	In the Company of Men
1998	Eamonn Owens	The Butcher Boy
1999	Haley Joel Osment	
2000	Rob Brown	
2001	Rupert Grint; Dakota Fanning	Harry Potter and the Philosopher's Stone; I Am Sam
2002	Derek Luke	Antwone Fisher
2003	none	
2004	Freddie Highmore	
2005	Rupert Friend	
2006	none	
2007	none	
2008	Brandon Walters	
2009	Gabourey Sidibe	Precious
2010	none	
2011	none	
2012	Quvenzhané Wallis	Beasts of the Southern Wild

=== Best First Feature ===
Year	Winner	Film
2011	Paddy Considine	Tyrannosaur
2016	Rusudan Glurjidze	House of Others
2017	John Carroll Lynch	Lucky
2018	Rupert Everett	The Happy Prince
2019	Laure de Clermont-Tonnerre	The Mustang
2020	Channing Godfrey Peoples	Miss Juneteenth
2021	Halle Berry	Bruised

=== Breakthrough Performance Award ===
Year	Winner	Film
2013	Michael B. Jordan; Sophie Nélisse	Fruitvale Station; The Book Thief
