= The Antique (2024 film) =

- Festival poster
- Directed by: Rusudan Glurjidze
- Written by: Anonymous; Rusudan Glurjidze
- Produced by: Zurab Magalashvili; Manana Shevardnadze; Andrey Epifanov; Tanya Petrik; Jussi Myllyniemi; Uschi Feldges
- Starring: Salome Demuria; Sergey Dreyden; Vladimir Daushvili
- Cinematography: Gorka Gómez Andreu
- Edited by: Grigol Palavandishvili
- Music by: Gia Kancheli
- Production companies: Cinetech; Cinetrain; Whitepoint Digital; Basis Berlin Filmproduction
- Release date: 6 September 2024 (Venice)
- Running time: 132 minutes
- Countries: Georgia; Switzerland; Finland; Germany
- Languages: Georgian; Russian
- Budget: €892,000

The Antique (Georgian: ანტიკვარიატი) is a 2024 drama film directed by Rusudan Glurjidze. Inspired by the 2006 deportation of Georgians from Russia, the film depicts a Georgian woman who moves in with an old man in Saint Petersburg and is pursued by Russian authorities seeking to deport Georgians from the country. A co-production between Georgia, Switzerland, Finland, and Germany, it is Glurjidze's second feature film, following House of Others (2016).

The Antique premiered in the Giornate degli Autori section of the 81st Venice International Film Festival on 6 September 2024. It was initially set to premiere on 28 August 2024, but the screening was suspended following a decree issued by the Court of Venice obtained by Russian, Croatian, and Cypriot companies over a copyright dispute. The suspension was lifted after the section submitted a counterclaim and the court authorised the screening.

The film was chosen as the Georgian entry for the Best International Feature Film at the 97th Academy Awards, but was not nominated.

== Cast ==
- Salome Demuria as Medea
- Sergey Dreyden as Vadim Vadimich
- Vladimir Daushvili as Lado
- Vladimir Vdovichenkov as Peter

== Production ==
The Antique was co-written by an anonymous writer, whose identify is withheld for safety, and Glurjidze. Filming took place from 25 January to 11 April 2022 in Saint Petersburg and Tbilisi. According to Glurjidze and producer Zurab Magalashvili, the Russian Ministry of Culture demanded 16 scenes be cut, and the film faced attempts at obstruction during and after the shooting, including damage to costumes and confiscation of filmed material at customs. Glurjidze also said that a Russian co-producer "didn't fulfill their [financial] obligations" before shooting.

== Release ==
The Antique was set to screen in the Giornate degli Autori, an independent section of the Venice Film Festival, but the section announced on 27 August 2024 that the screenings, scheduled on 28 August, 30 August, and 6 September, were suspended in agreement with the Biennale Foundation, which organises the festival, following an emergency decree issued by the Court of Venice over a copyright dispute regarding the film's screenplay, even though the court did not specifically ban the screening of the film. The decree was obtained by production companies Viva Films in Russia, Avvantura in Croatia, and Pygmalion in Cyprus. Viva Films and Pygmalion are owned by Russian producer Nadezhda Gorshkova, and Avvantura is owned by Sergej Stanojkovski. It was reported that it was the Biennale Foundation that proposed the suspension in response to the decree.

The decree was prompted by a petition accusing Georgian producer Zurab Magalashvili of "significant violations" of a co-production agreement between his company, Cinetech, and the three companies. Without hearing from the producers who were accused, the court found that Cinetech failed to comply with the agreement and violated international copyright laws. The Council of Europe's Eurimages fund awarded €150,000 to the project, then to be co-produced by Cinetech, Viva Films, and Avvantura, in 2021, but Eurimages withdrew its funding after Magalashvili failed to provide required documentation.

Glurjidze claimed to be under censorship, while Stanojkovski, in correspondence with Semafor, denied acting "on behalf of the Russian state, or any other state", and said that his interest lay "in the swift resolution of this matter so that the film can be released ... allowing all investors to begin recouping their investments".

On 4 September 2024, the Giornate degli Autori announced that the suspension had been lifted and the screening on 6 September would take place, after the section submitted a counterclaim to the Court of Venice and the court authorised the screening, recognising Glurjidze's moral rights.

On 30 October 2024, Viva Films and Avvantura filed another lawsuit with the Court of Venice against Cinetech and the Giornate degli Autori, claiming they are "liable for damages caused by the illicit communication of the work to the public which took place on 30 August [sic] and 6 September 2024".

== Reception ==
Vittoria Scarpa of Cineuropa wrote, "The film shows the relationship that, from an initial distrust, comes to establish itself between the despotic Vadim and the strong-willed Medea ... while avoiding easy sentimentalism and inviting a reflection on memory." Matthew Joseph Jenner of the International Cinephile Society described the film as a "beautifully directed and genuinely impactful social realist drama" and "a striking series of profound observations of the human condition", giving it four out of five stars. Jonathan Holland of Screen Daily found the film "carefully crafted, darkly surreal and politically engaged".

== See also ==
- List of submissions to the 97th Academy Awards for Best International Feature Film
- List of Georgian submissions for the Academy Award for Best International Feature Film
