= Olga Dihovichnaya =

Belarusian actress (born 1980)

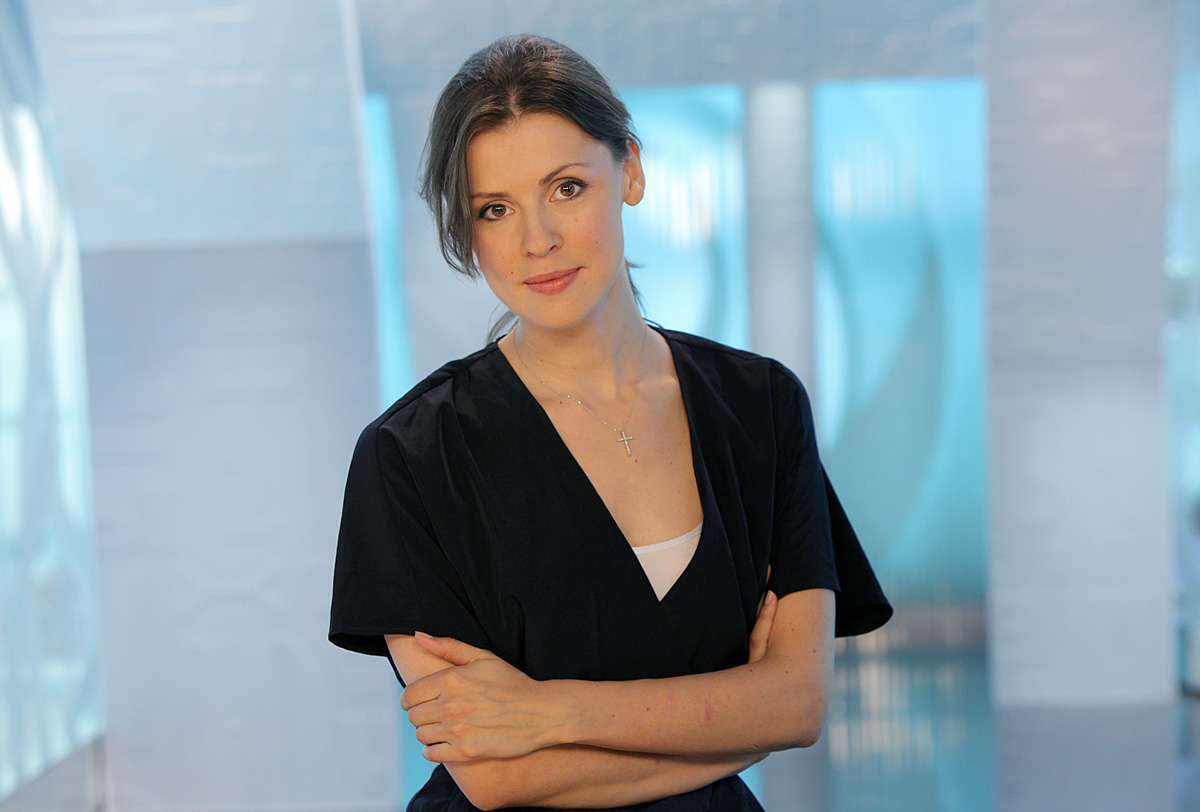
- Born: Olga Yurievna Golyak; 4 September 1980 (age 45); Minsk, USSR (now Belarus)
- Citizenship: Belarus; Russia
- Occupations: Actress; director; producer
- Years active: 2002–present

Olga Yurievna Dihovichnaya, born Golyak (Russian: О́льга Ю́рьевна Дыхови́чная, romanized: Olga Yuryevna Dykhovichnaya; born 4 September 1980) is a Belarusian and Russian actress, producer and director.

== Biography ==
Graduated in 1997 from Belarusian State University Olga worked on Belarusian television as a host of the program “Morning Cocktail” (Russian: Утренний коктейль). Then she moved to Moscow and worked in the TV company VID while doing her studies in the workshop of Aleksei Yuryevich German (1938–2013) and Svetlana Igorevna Karmalita (1940–2017). Olga became a famous actress, producer and director. In the early 2000s, she worked in the studio Volya, where she directed a number of documentary films. In 2010 she became producer of International Independent Film Festival 2morrow and also a producer of 2morrowFilms film company. As an actress, she is best known for a lead role in a controversial film Twilight Portrait (Портрет в сумерках) (2011), where she also took a part as a co-writer and co-producer. Twilight Portrait premiered at Venice Film Festival, and among numerous awards at film festivals worldwide received a Nomination Discovery of the Year by European Film Academy.

== Filmography (actress) ==
Year	Title	Role	Notes
2002	The Kopeck	Tanya	
2002	Money	Wife	
2006	Inhale-Exhale	Kira	
2009	Mystery of Love	himself	
2011	Twilight Portrait (ru)	Marina	
2011	Two Days	Lida	
2013	City Spies	Lapina	TV series
2013	Weekend (ru)	Photographer's wife	
2014	Welcome Home	Sasha	
2015	Pointe Shoes for the Bun	Irina	
2016	Money	Nina Filatova	TV mini-series
2016	Matreshka (ru)	Linda	
2016	House of Others	Liza	
2017	Exchange		Cameo
2017	Life	Katerina Golovkina	

== Filmography (director) ==
- 2011 Writers and producer: Twilight Portrait
- 2014 Writers: Welcome Home
