= Life (2017 film) =

2017 film by Daniel Espinosa

- Theatrical release poster
- Directed by: Daniel Espinosa
- Written by: Rhett Reese; Paul Wernick
- Produced by: David Ellison; Dana Goldberg; Bonnie Curtis; Julie Lynn
- Starring: Jake Gyllenhaal; Rebecca Ferguson; Ryan Reynolds; Hiroyuki Sanada; Ariyon Bakare; Olga Dihovichnaya
- Cinematography: Seamus McGarvey
- Edited by: Frances Parker; Mary Jo Markey
- Music by: Jon Ekstrand
- Production companies: Columbia Pictures; Skydance
- Distributed by: Sony Pictures Releasing
- Release dates: March 18, 2017 (SXSW); March 24, 2017 (United States)
- Running time: 104 minutes
- Country: United States
- Language: English
- Budget: $58 million
- Box office: $100.5 million

Life is a 2017 American science fiction horror film directed by Daniel Espinosa, written by Rhett Reese and Paul Wernick and starring an ensemble cast consisting of Jake Gyllenhaal, Rebecca Ferguson, Ryan Reynolds, Hiroyuki Sanada, Ariyon Bakare, and Olga Dihovichnaya. In the film, a six-member crew of the International Space Station uncovers the first evidence of extraterrestrial life on Mars. When members of the crew conduct their research, the rapidly evolving life-form proves to be far more intelligent and dangerous than expected.

The development of Life began in November 2015, when it was announced that Espinosa would direct a film set in space written by Wernick and Reese. After the deal with Paramount Pictures was not confirmed, Sony Pictures signed on to handle the worldwide distribution rights and co-finance the film, with Skydance in March 2016. The casting call took place in January 2016, and filming took place in France, New York City and Vietnam between February and July. The visual effects were handled by DNEG, Industrial Light & Magic, NVIZIBLE, One of Us, Outpost VFX and Atomic Fiction.

It premiered at South by Southwest on March 18, 2017, and was theatrically released in the United States by Sony Pictures Releasing on March 24, 2017. It received positive reviews on Rotten Tomatoes and mixed reviews on Metacritic. It grossed $100 million worldwide against a $58 million budget.

== Plot ==
In the near future, an uncrewed space probe returns from Mars to Earth's orbit with soil samples potentially containing evidence of extraterrestrial life. The probe is collected by the International Space Station, where exobiologist Hugh Derry revives a dormant cell that quickly grows into a multi-celled organism; a group of schoolchildren vote to name the organism "Calvin".

An atmosphere change in Calvin's container causes it to enter hibernation. To wake it up, Hugh administers an electric shock. Calvin becomes hostile, wrapping itself around Hugh's hand and crushing it. Calvin escapes its enclosure by fabricating a tool and devours a lab rat, growing in size. Engineer Rory Adams rescues Hugh, but Calvin grabs onto his leg, prompting Dr. David Jordan to seal the lab. After Rory fails to kill Calvin with fire, the organism kills him by forcing itself down his throat and assimilating his organs. It escapes the lab through a vent.

The crew attempts to inform Earth, but the station's communication system shuts down before the entire message can be sent. The station commander, Ekaterina "Kat" Golovkina, performs a spacewalk to find and fix the communications system. Calvin attacks Kat and damages her spacesuit. As her suit fills with coolant, Kat returns to the airlock. Against David's wishes, Kat sacrifices herself to keep Calvin out of the station; however, Calvin latches on to the station before she drifts into space.

Calvin attempts to re-enter the station through its maneuvering thrusters. The crew fire the thrusters to blast it away, but the loss of fuel sends the station into a decaying orbit, where it will burn up when it reenters Earth's atmosphere. Systems tech Sho Murakami suggests using the remaining fuel to get back into a stable orbit, even though it will allow Calvin to re-enter. The crew agree as Hugh says Calvin could potentially survive re-entry. The crew plan to seal themselves in one side of the station and quarantine Calvin in the other before venting the atmosphere to kill Calvin. Unknown to Hugh, who is a paraplegic, Calvin attaches itself to his leg and uses him to slip out of the quarantined area. The crew discovers Calvin feeding from Hugh after he collapses; as Hugh dies from blood loss, Sho seals himself inside a sleeping pod, while Calvin tries to break inside. David and Miranda use Hugh's corpse as bait to lure Calvin away and trap it.

As they vent the atmosphere from Calvin's area, a spacecraft approaches the space station. Miranda informs David that having received most of the original distress call, the protocol would be for Earth to send a Soyuz spacecraft to push the station into deep space to stop Calvin from reaching Earth. Unaware that the new craft is not a rescue, Sho opens the hatch to it. Calvin follows him and kills the Soyuz's crew, and the airlock between the Soyuz and the space station is breached. Sho sacrifices himself in another attempt to launch Calvin into space. The Soyuz disconnects and crashes into the space station, knocking it back into a decaying orbit.

David and Miranda try to trap Calvin in an escape pod. Once inside, David will pilot the pod containing Calvin into deep space, allowing Miranda to return to Earth in the other pod. David leads Calvin into his pod by baiting it with oxygen sticks and launches into space. As Miranda launches her pod, she records a black box message to warn Earth of Calvin's intelligence and lethality. Both pods are hit by debris from the damaged Soyuz. One pod ends up landing in the south Pacific Ocean and is found by Vietnamese fishermen, while the other pod flies away from Earth into deep space. The fishermen look inside the pod's window to see Calvin enveloping David in the entirety of the interior; Miranda screams in horror as her out-of-control pod drifts away from Earth. As more boats approach the pod, the unsuspecting fishermen open its hatch door despite David's pleas not to.

== Cast ==
- Jake Gyllenhaal as Dr. David Jordan, USA, ISS medical officer.
- Rebecca Ferguson as Dr. Miranda North, UK, CDC quarantine officer.
- Ryan Reynolds as Rory Adams, USA, ISS engineer.
- Hiroyuki Sanada as Sho Murakami, Japan, ISS systems engineer.
- Ariyon Bakare as Dr. Hugh Derry, UK, ISS exobiologist.
- Olga Dihovichnaya as Ekaterina "Kat" Golovkina, Russia, ISS Mission Commander.
- Naoko Mori as Kazumi, Sho Murakami's wife.

== Production ==
=== Development ===
On November 18, 2015, Deadline Hollywood reported that Daniel Espinosa would direct a film set in space and titled Life, from a script from Paul Wernick and Rhett Reese, which Skydance Media would finance and produce, with David Ellison, Dana Goldberg, Bonnie Curtis, and Julie Lynn. Paramount Pictures was circling to handle the distribution rights to the film, though the deal was not confirmed. On January 28, 2016, Rebecca Ferguson came on board to star in the film, and Ryan Reynolds subsequently joined, on February 16, 2016. On March 10, 2016, Jake Gyllenhaal was cast in the film. On March 15, 2016, Sony Pictures signed on to handle the worldwide distribution rights and co-finance the film, with Skydance. On June 23, 2016, Hiroyuki Sanada was cast to play one of the members of the International Space Station crew, and on July 19, 2016, The Hollywood Reporter wrote that Olga Dihovichnaya and Ariyon Bakare were also cast in the film, playing other crew members. One scene in the trailer for the film features a recycled shot from the 2007 movie, Spider-Man 3.

=== Filming ===
Principal photography on the film began at London's Shepperton Studios on July 19, 2016. To emulate the lack of gravity, the actors were suspended by wires that were erased in post-production. Most of the visual effects were handled by Double Negative, aside from the eight-minute long take that opens the movie, which was created by Industrial Light & Magic using the ISS model sculpted by Double Negative. That scene was described by Daniel Espinosa as "the inverse version of Gravity. Gravity looks at the vastness of space through the oner. I wanted to look at the claustrophobia." Espinosa said that Life was "shot to make a science fiction movie that ties into this other great American genre, which is noir", with the death of the most charismatic character that seems to be the protagonist—using Psycho as an example, Espinosa explained that "Ryan [Reynolds] became my Janet Leigh"—and a downer ending.

=== Music ===
Composer Jon Ekstrand wrote his sixth score while working with Espinosa. Ekstrand aimed to create an "atonal-horror score with some melodic elements", mostly focused on orchestral music while opening with "more melodic and classical cinematic" tones to not give away the horror trappings early on. Espinosa specifically told Ekstrand to seek a sound reminiscent of Bernard Herrmann, with some influence from Khachaturian to reference the music from 2001: A Space Odyssey (Gayaneh's Adagio, used for long shots of the Discovery heading towards Jupiter).

== Release ==
Life was released by Columbia Pictures on March 24, 2017, after being moved up from its previously announced release date of May 26, 2017, to avoid competition with Pirates of the Caribbean: Dead Men Tell No Tales and Alien: Covenant, the latter of which had moved up its release date from August 4, 2017, to May 19, 2017. Life had its world premiere at South by Southwest on March 18, 2017.

== Marketing ==
In March 2017, it was noted that stock footage of a crowd reacting to Spider-Man catching Gwen Stacy from Spider-Man 3's B-roll was used in a trailer for Life. This announcement led to theories that Life was secretly an origin story for the symbiote featured in Spider-Man 3, a theory made more popular by the announcement of a Venom film shortly afterwards, and that Life's screenwriters, Rhett Reese and Paul Wernick, had previously written a Venom script. When asked about the rumor, Daniel Espinosa confirmed that he was a fan of Venom. Jake Gyllenhaal later portrayed Mysterio in the 2019 Marvel Cinematic Universe film Spider-Man: Far From Home. Espinosa went on to direct Morbius, based on the Spider-Man character. In February 2017, Skydance Interactive announced a VR tie-in promo to the film along with their first game Archangel.

== Reception ==
=== Box office ===
Life grossed $30.2 million in the United States and Canada and $70.3 million in other territories for a worldwide gross of $100.5 million, against a production budget of $58 million.

In North America, Life opened alongside Power Rangers, CHiPs, and Wilson, and was projected to gross $12–17 million from 3,146 theaters during its opening weekend. It ended up debuting to $12.6 million, finishing 4th at the box office, behind Beauty and the Beast, Power Rangers, and Kong: Skull Island. In its second weekend, the film grossed $5.5 million, dropping to 8th at the box office.

=== Critical response ===
On review aggregation website Rotten Tomatoes, the film has an approval rating of 68% based on 261 reviews and an average rating of 6/10. The site's critical consensus reads, "Life is just thrilling, well-acted, and capably filmed enough to overcome an overall inability to add new wrinkles to the trapped-in-space genre." On Metacritic, the film has a weighted average score of 54 out of 100, based on reviews from 44 critics, indicating "mixed or average" reviews. Audiences polled by CinemaScore gave the film an average grade of "C+" on an A+ to F scale, while PostTrak reported 48% of audience members gave the film a "definite recommend".

Joe Morgenstern of The Wall Street Journal said of the film, "For all its flashy trappings, weighty ruminations and zero-gravity floatings aboard the International Space Station, Life turns out to be another variant of Alien, though without the grungy horror and grim fun. In space no one can hear you snore." Describing the theme of outer space, Ben Kenigsberg of The New York Times said "As the astronauts contend with airlocks, busted equipment and escape pods, it becomes increasingly difficult to pretend that this isn't territory where more inventive screenwriters and stronger visual stylists have gone before." Peter Travers of Rolling Stone faulted not the scenes but the performances, saying there was "not a single actor in Life who manages to fill in and humanize the blank space where a character should be."

Michael O'Sullivan of The Washington Post approved of these character flaws, saying the "conflicting dynamics of their individual temperaments lead occasionally to poor decision-making. While this may be bad for their health, it's great for the movie," adding that "Life has cool effects, real suspense and a sweet twist. It ain't rocket science, but it does what it does well—even, one might say, with a kind of genius." Richard Brody of The New Yorker complimented this balance of character and plot from the director, saying "Espinosa's sense of drama is efficient, familiar, and narrow; if there's a moral sentiment to his direction, it's precisely in the limits that he imposes on the movie's dose of pain and gore." Kenneth Turan of the Los Angeles Times opined that Life, with a mise-en-scène of the International Space Station, was "a wonderful setting for a meal we've tasted before," adding that it is "undeniably satisfying to be in the hands of a persuasive director who knows how to slowly ratchet up the tension to a properly unnerving level."

Empire summarized their review as "part Alien, part Gravity, just not as good as either of them. But Life whips along at a decent pace and deploys enough engaging action sequences to make it work."

The survivors' reading of Margaret Wise Brown's children's bedtime story Goodnight Moon drew criticism from Peter Bradshaw, who stated "the crew’s memories of the kids’ bedtime book are supposed to lend a little gentleness and humanity to the film, and a bit of a narrative breather, but this third-act conceit only succeeds in replacing a creeping sense of tiredness with sentimentality." Wendy Ide of The Guardian stated that the reading of the book caused the second act to drag, and was not an improvement.

=== Accolades ===
List of accolades
Award / film festival	Category	Recipient(s)	Result	Ref.
16th Visual Effects Society Awards	Outstanding Model in a Photoreal or Animated Project	Tom Edwards, Chaitanya Kshirsagar, Satish Kuttan, Paresh Dodia for "The ISS"	Nominated	
44th Saturn Awards	Best Science Fiction Film	Life	Nominated	

== See also ==
- List of American films of 2017
- List of films featuring extraterrestrials
- List of films featuring space stations
- List of science fiction horror films
