= Rusudan Glurjidze =

Georgian director, screenwriter, and producer

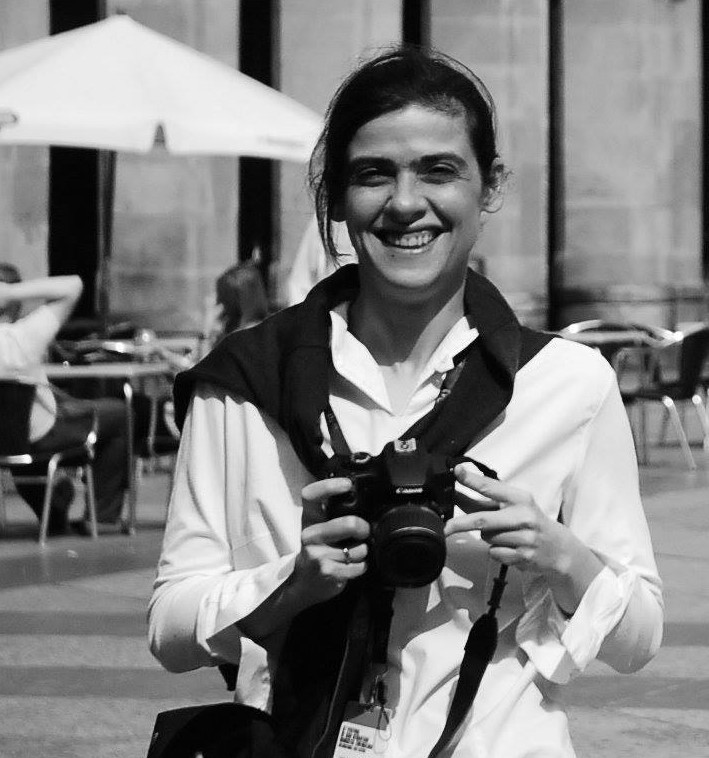
- Rusudan in 2016.
- Born: 21 July 1972 (age 52); Tbilisi, Georgia
- Occupation(s): Film director, Film producer, Screenwriter

Rusudan Glurjidze (Georgian: რუსუდან გლურჯიძე, [rusudan ɡlurdʒidze]; born 21 July 1972, Tbilisi) is a Georgian film director, screenwriter, and producer.

== Biography ==
Rusudan Glurjidze was born on 21 July 1972, in Tbilisi, Georgia.

She graduated in French Language and Literature from the Tbilisi State University and from 1990 to 1996 studied Film Directing and Screenwriting at Giorgi Shengelaia’s class at the Shota Rustaveli Theatre and Film University.

After 1996, Glurjidze worked in advertising and at the Georgian Public Broadcaster, making musical and commercial clips. Since 2007, she has been working as a producer and art director of Cinetech Film Production Company, and worked as 1st Assistant Director on Giorgi Shengelaia’s comedy The Train Went On and On (მოდიოდა მატარებელი).

Directed by Rusudan Glurjidze, the feature film The House of Others is a co-production between Georgia, Russia, Spain and Croatia. The story is set in the 1990s, after a civil war, when two families on the winning side are relocated to the hastily vacated houses of the defeated. However, they don’t seem to be able to build a new, peaceful life, as the scars of the war continue to rage within them.

The film is the director’s first feature, and was screened in the East of the West competition at the Karlovy Vary International Film Festival, taking home the Grand Prix.

The House of Others also won the Grand Prix at the 12th Eurasia international film Festival 2016, The Network for the Promotion of Asian Cinema (NETPAC) as The Best Asian Film and the Bergen International Film Festival (BIFF) 2016 as Cinema Extraordinaire

The House of Others by Rusudan Glurjidze is Georgia's candidate in the 89th Academy Awards for Best Foreign Language Film.

== Filmography ==
Year	Film	Status	
Year	Film	Director	Screenwriter
1993	Nocturne	Yes	Yes
1996	Oscar	Yes	Yes
2016	House of Others	Yes	Yes
2024	The Antique	Yes	Yes

== Sources ==
- Odessa International Film Festival 2016 report, The Skinny
- The Best European Arthouse Films of the Year (So Far), Another Magazine
- Georgia announces film bid for Oscars 2017, Agenda
- Rusudan Glurjidze • Director Interview, Cineuropa
- Karlovy Vary Film Review: ‘House of Others’, Variety
- 'House of Others' ('Skhvisi sakhli'): Film Review, The Hollywood Reporter
- The House of Others - I Fantasmi Degli, GeoMovies
- Årets Prisvinnere BIFF 2016
- Определились победители «Евразии» и «Созвездия Шакена», Радио Азаттык
