= House of Others =

2016 film

- Film poster
- Directed by: Rusudan Glurjidze
- Written by: David Chubinishvili; Rusudan Glurjidze
- Screenplay by: David Chubinishvili
- Produced by: Zurab Magalashvili
- Starring: Zurab Magalashvili; Olga Dihovichnaya; Ia Sukhitashvili; Salome Demuria
- Production companies: CineTech; Liga Production; Kinoskopik s.l.; Embrio Production; Sarke Studio
- Release date: 5 July 2016 (Karlovy Vary)
- Running time: 103 minutes
- Countries: Georgia; Russia
- Languages: Georgian; Russian

House of Others (Georgian: სხვისი სახლი) is a 2016 Georgian-Russian drama film directed by Rusudan Glurjidze. It was selected as the Georgian entry for the Best Foreign Language Film at the 89th Academy Awards but it was not nominated.

== Cast ==
- Zurab Magalashvili
- Olga Dihovichnaya
- Ia Sukhitashvili
- Salome Demuria

== Awards ==

Award	Film Festival
The Grand Prix at The East of the West competition	Karlovy Vary International Film Festival
The Grand Prix	The 12th Eurasia International Film Festival
The Best Asian Film	The Network for the Promotion of Asian Cinema
The Cinema Extraordinair	Bergen International Film Festival
The Best First Feature Award	21st Satellite Awards

== See also ==
- List of submissions to the 89th Academy Awards for Best Foreign Language Film
- List of Georgian submissions for the Academy Award for Best Foreign Language Film
