= List of awards and nominations received by The Office (American TV series) =

Awards and nominations received by The Office
Awards and nominations
Award	Wins	Nominations
ALMA Awards	1	5
American Cinema Editors Awards	2	3
AFI Awards	2	2
Annie Awards	0	1
ADG Awards	0	2
British Comedy Awards	0	2
Cinema Audio Society Awards	0	2
The Comedy Awards	0	6
Critics' Choice Television Awards	0	2
Daytime Emmy Awards	1	1
Directors Guild of America Awards	1	1
GLAAD Media Awards	0	1
Golden Globe Awards	1	9
Imagen Awards	0	3
NAACP Image Awards	3	10
Peabody Awards	1	1
People's Choice Awards	0	3
Primetime Emmy Awards	5	44
Prism Awards	1	4
Producers Guild of America Awards	1	5
Satellite Awards	0	6
Screen Actors Guild Awards	2	13
Teen Choice Awards	2	11
TCA Awards	3	7
TV Land Awards	1	1
Writers Guild of America Awards	3	19

Totals (Note: Certain award groups do not simply award one winner. They acknowledge several different recipients, have runners-up, and have third place. Since this is a specific recognition and is different from losing an award, runner-up mentions are considered wins in this award tally. For simplification and to avoid errors, each award in this list has been presumed to have had a prior nomination.)
- Wins: 30
- Nominations: 164

The Office is an American television sitcom developed by Greg Daniels and based on the British series of the same name created by Ricky Gervais and Stephen Merchant. The show premiered on NBC on March 24, 2005, and concluded on May 16, 2013, after airing 201 episodes across nine seasons. Filmed as a mockumentary, the series depicts the everyday lives of a group of office employees in the Scranton, Pennsylvania, branch of the fictional Dunder Mifflin Paper Company. The Office initially featured Steve Carell as Michael Scott, Rainn Wilson as Dwight Schrute, John Krasinski as Jim Halpert, Jenna Fischer as Pam Beesly, and B. J. Novak as Ryan Howard; the show's cast changed significantly during its run.

Despite premiering to mixed reviews during its first season, The Office's subsequent seasons received widespread acclaim and became a success for NBC, though later seasons were criticized for a dip in quality. From 2006 to 2011, the show was nominated six consecutive times for the Primetime Emmy Award for Outstanding Comedy Series, winning for its second season. The show was also nominated for three Golden Globe Awards for Best Television Series – Musical or Comedy; five Producers Guild of America Awards for Best Episodic Comedy, winning once; the 2006 TCA Award for Program of the Year; and four TCA Awards for Outstanding Achievement in Comedy, winning twice. The Office was named as one of the top television programs of 2006 and 2008 by the American Film Institute, and in 2007, the series was recognized with a Peabody Award.

The performances of many of the show's actors were recognized. Carell was nominated six times for the Primetime Emmy Award for Outstanding Lead Actor in a Comedy Series but never won, which has been frequently called one of the biggest snubs in Emmys history. Carell also received a Golden Globe Award, a TCA Award, and six Screen Actors Guild Award nominations for his performance. Wilson was nominated for three Primetime Emmy Awards for Outstanding Supporting Actor in a Comedy Series, and Fischer was nominated once for Outstanding Supporting Actress in a Comedy Series. As a whole, the cast was nominated seven times for the Screen Actors Guild Award for Outstanding Performance by an Ensemble in a Comedy Series, winning in 2007 and 2008.

The Office's writing and directing also received numerous accolades. The series won two Writers Guild of America Awards for Television: Episodic Comedy for "Casino Night", written by Carell, and "The Job", written by Paul Lieberstein and Michael Schur. In addition, the show's writing staff was recognized with the Writers Guild of America Award for Television: Comedy Series in 2007, and Daniels won the Primetime Emmy Award for Outstanding Writing for a Comedy Series for the episode "Gay Witch Hunt". Paul Feig received a Directors Guild of America Award for his work on "Dinner Party", while Jeffrey Blitz won the Primetime Emmy Award for Outstanding Directing for a Comedy Series for "Stress Relief".

== Awards and nominations ==
Awards and nominations received by The Office
Award	Year (Note: The listed year refers to the date of the ceremony, not necessarily the year in which the corresponding season or episode aired.)	Category	Nominee(s)	Result	Ref.
ALMA Awards	2008	Outstanding Male Performance in a Comedy Television Series	Oscar Nunez	Nominated	
ALMA Awards	2009	Best Comedy Actor	Oscar Nunez	Won	
ALMA Awards	2009	Best Comedy Actress	Jessica Alba	Nominated	
ALMA Awards	2011	Favorite TV Actor – Supporting Role	Oscar Nunez	Nominated	
ALMA Awards	2012	Favorite TV Actor – Supporting Role in a Comedy	Oscar Nunez	Nominated	
American Cinema Editors Awards	2007	Best Edited Half-Hour Series for Television	Dean Holland and David Rogers (for "Casino Night")	Won	
American Cinema Editors Awards	2009	Best Edited Half-Hour Series for Television	Dean Holland and David Rogers (for "Goodbye, Toby")	Nominated	
American Cinema Editors Awards	2014	Best Edited Half-Hour Series for Television	David Rogers and Claire Scanlon (for "Finale")	Won	
American Film Institute Awards	2006	Television Programs of the Year	The Office	Won (Note: Awards in the categories do not have prior nominations and only winners are announced. For simplification and to avoid errors, each award in the list was presumed to have had a prior nomination.)	
American Film Institute Awards	2008	Television Programs of the Year	The Office	Won	
Annie Awards	2023	Best Animated Television Commercial	Minions: The Rise of Gru / The Office	Nominated	
Art Directors Guild Awards	2009	Episode of a Half Hour Single-Camera Television Series	Michael G. Gallenberg (for "Weight Loss") (Note: Additional nominees: Matt Flynn (art director); W. Rick Nichol (set designer); Steve Rostine (set decorator))	Nominated	
Art Directors Guild Awards	2010	Episode of a Half Hour Single-Camera Television Series	Michael G. Gallenberg (for "Niagara") (Note: Additional nominees: Matt Flynn (art director); W. Rick Nichol (set designer); Henry Saine (graphic designer); Steve Rostine (set decorator))	Nominated	
British Comedy Awards	2006	Best International Comedy Show	The Office	Nominated	
British Comedy Awards	2007	Best International Comedy Show	The Office	Nominated	
Cinema Audio Society Awards	2013	Outstanding Achievement in Sound Mixing for Television Series – Half Hour	Benjamin Patrick, John W. Cook II, and Kenneth Kobett (for "New Guys")	Nominated	
Cinema Audio Society Awards	2014	Outstanding Achievement in Sound Mixing for Television Series – Half Hour	Benjamin Patrick, John W. Cook II, and Robert Carr (for "Finale")	Nominated	
The Comedy Awards	2011	Comedy Series	The Office	Nominated	
The Comedy Awards	2011	Comedy Actor – TV	Steve Carell	Nominated	
The Comedy Awards	2011	Comedy Writing – TV	The Office	Nominated	
The Comedy Awards	2011	Comedy Directing – TV	The Office	Nominated	
The Comedy Awards	2012	Performance by an Actor – TV	Steve Carell	Nominated	
The Comedy Awards	2012	Comedy Directing – TV	The Office	Nominated	
Critics' Choice Television Awards	2011	Best Comedy Series	The Office	Nominated	
Critics' Choice Television Awards	2011	Best Actor in a Comedy Series	Steve Carell	Nominated	
Daytime Emmy Awards	2007	Outstanding Broadband Program – Comedy	The Office: The Accountants (Note: Nominees: Vivi Zigler (executive vice president, NBC Digital Entertainment); Jeff Ross (executive producer); Jordan Schlansky, Mike Sweeney, and Robert Angelo (producers); Paul Lieberstein, Michael Schur, Brian Baumgartner, Angela Kinsey, and Oscar Nunez (performers))	Won	
Directors Guild of America Awards	2009	Outstanding Directorial Achievement in a Comedy Series	Paul Feig (for "Dinner Party") (Note: Additional nominees: Robert Rothbard (unit production manager); Kelly Cantley (first assistant director); Jennie O'Keefe (second assistant director); Jasmine Alhambra (second second assistant director))	Won	
GLAAD Media Awards	2007	Outstanding Comedy Series	The Office	Nominated	
Golden Globe Awards	2006	Best Actor in a Television Series – Musical or Comedy	Steve Carell	Won	
Golden Globe Awards	2007	Best Television Series – Musical or Comedy	The Office	Nominated	
Golden Globe Awards	2007	Best Actor in a Television Series – Musical or Comedy	Steve Carell	Nominated	
Golden Globe Awards	2008	Best Actor in a Television Series – Musical or Comedy	Steve Carell	Nominated	
Golden Globe Awards	2009	Best Television Series – Musical or Comedy	The Office	Nominated	
Golden Globe Awards	2009	Best Actor in a Television Series – Musical or Comedy	Steve Carell	Nominated	
Golden Globe Awards	2010	Best Television Series – Musical or Comedy	The Office	Nominated	
Golden Globe Awards	2010	Best Actor in a Television Series – Musical or Comedy	Steve Carell	Nominated	
Golden Globe Awards	2011	Best Actor in a Television Series – Musical or Comedy	Steve Carell	Nominated	
Imagen Awards	2010	Best Supporting Actor, Television	Oscar Nunez	Nominated	
Imagen Awards	2012	Best Supporting Actor, Television	Oscar Nunez	Nominated	
Imagen Awards	2013	Best Supporting Actor, Television	Oscar Nunez	Nominated	
NAACP Image Awards	2007	Outstanding Directing in a Comedy Series	Ken Whittingham (for "Michael's Birthday")	Won	
NAACP Image Awards	2008	Outstanding Directing in a Comedy Series	Ken Whittingham (for "Phyllis' Wedding")	Won	
NAACP Image Awards	2008	Outstanding Writing in a Comedy Series	Mindy Kaling (for "Branch Wars")	Nominated	
NAACP Image Awards	2009	Outstanding Writing in a Comedy Series	Ryan Koh (for "Business Ethics")	Nominated	
NAACP Image Awards	2010	Outstanding Directing in a Comedy Series	Reginald Hudlin (for "Koi Pond")	Nominated	
NAACP Image Awards	2010	Outstanding Writing in a Comedy Series	Halsted Sullivan and Warren Lieberstein (for "Cafe Disco")	Won	
NAACP Image Awards	2011	Outstanding Supporting Actor in a Comedy Series	Craig Robinson	Nominated	
NAACP Image Awards	2011	Outstanding Writing in a Comedy Series	Daniel Chun (for "Nepotism")	Nominated	
NAACP Image Awards	2012	Outstanding Supporting Actor in a Comedy Series	Craig Robinson	Nominated	
NAACP Image Awards	2013	Outstanding Supporting Actor in a Comedy Series	Craig Robinson	Nominated	
Peabody Awards	2007	–	The Office (Note: Presented to Reveille Studios in association with NBC Universal Television Studios)	Won	
People's Choice Awards	2010	Favorite TV Comedy	The Office	Nominated	
People's Choice Awards	2012	Favorite TV Guest Star	Jim Carrey	Nominated	
People's Choice Awards	2014	Favorite Series We Miss Most	The Office	Nominated	
Primetime Emmy Awards	2006	Outstanding Comedy Series	The Office (Note: Nominees: Greg Daniels, Ben Silverman, Ricky Gervais, Stephen Merchant, and Howard Klein (executive producers); Paul Lieberstein (co-executive producer); Michael Schur and Kent Zbornak (producers))	Won	
Primetime Emmy Awards	2006	Outstanding Lead Actor in a Comedy Series	Steve Carell	Nominated	
Primetime Emmy Awards	2006	Outstanding Writing for a Comedy Series	Michael Schur (for "Christmas Party")	Nominated	
Primetime Emmy Awards	2007	Outstanding Comedy Series	The Office (Note: Nominees: Ben Silverman, Greg Daniels, Ricky Gervais, Stephen Merchant, and Howard Klein (executive producers); Paul Lieberstein, Jennifer Celotta, Michael Schur, Kent Zbornak, and Teri Weinberg (co-executive producers); B. J. Novak (supervising producer); Mindy Kaling (producer))	Nominated	
Primetime Emmy Awards	2007	Outstanding Lead Actor in a Comedy Series	Steve Carell	Nominated	
Primetime Emmy Awards	2007	Outstanding Supporting Actor in a Comedy Series	Rainn Wilson	Nominated	
Primetime Emmy Awards	2007	Outstanding Supporting Actress in a Comedy Series	Jenna Fischer	Nominated	
Primetime Emmy Awards	2007	Outstanding Writing for a Comedy Series	Greg Daniels (for "Gay Witch Hunt")	Won	
Primetime Emmy Awards	2007	Outstanding Writing for a Comedy Series	Michael Schur (for "The Negotiation")	Nominated	
Primetime Emmy Awards	2007	Outstanding Directing for a Comedy Series	Ken Kwapis (for "Gay Witch Hunt")	Nominated	
Primetime Emmy Awards	2008	Outstanding Comedy Series	The Office (Note: Nominees: Greg Daniels, Ben Silverman, Ricky Gervais, Stephen Merchant, and Howard Klein (executive producers); Paul Lieberstein, Michael Schur, Jennifer Celotta, Kent Zbornak, and Teri Weinberg (co-executive producers); B. J. Novak (supervising producer); Mindy Kaling, Lee Eisenberg, Gene Stupnitsky, and Steve Carell (producers))	Nominated	
Primetime Emmy Awards	2008	Outstanding Lead Actor in a Comedy Series	Steve Carell	Nominated	
Primetime Emmy Awards	2008	Outstanding Supporting Actor in a Comedy Series	Rainn Wilson	Nominated	
Primetime Emmy Awards	2008	Outstanding Writing for a Comedy Series	Lee Eisenberg and Gene Stupnitsky (for "Dinner Party")	Nominated	
Primetime Emmy Awards	2008	Outstanding Directing for a Comedy Series	Paul Feig (for "Goodbye, Toby")	Nominated	
Primetime Emmy Awards	2008	Outstanding Directing for a Comedy Series	Paul Lieberstein (for "Money")	Nominated	
Primetime Emmy Awards	2009	Outstanding Comedy Series	The Office (Note: Nominees: Greg Daniels, Ben Silverman, Ricky Gervais, Stephen Merchant, Howard Klein, Paul Lieberstein, and Jennifer Celotta (executive producers); Teri Weinberg, B. J. Novak, Mindy Kaling, Lee Eisenberg, Gene Stupnitsky, Paul Feig, and Aaron Shure (co-executive producers); Steve Carell, Justin Spitzer, Jake Aust, and Randy Cordray (producers))	Nominated	
Primetime Emmy Awards	2009	Outstanding Lead Actor in a Comedy Series	Steve Carell	Nominated	
Primetime Emmy Awards	2009	Outstanding Supporting Actor in a Comedy Series	Rainn Wilson	Nominated	
Primetime Emmy Awards	2009	Outstanding Directing for a Comedy Series	Jeffrey Blitz (for "Stress Relief")	Won	
Primetime Emmy Awards	2010	Outstanding Comedy Series	The Office (Note: Nominees: Greg Daniels, Ben Silverman, Ricky Gervais, Stephen Merchant, Howard Klein, and Paul Lieberstein (executive producers); Mindy Kaling, Lee Eisenberg, Gene Stupnitsky, B. J. Novak, Aaron Shure, and Teri Weinberg (co-executive producers); Steve Carell, Justin Spitzer, Charlie Grandy, Warren Lieberstein, and Halsted Sullivan (producers); Randy Cordray (produced by); Daniel Chun (supervising producer))	Nominated	
Primetime Emmy Awards	2010	Outstanding Lead Actor in a Comedy Series	Steve Carell	Nominated	
Primetime Emmy Awards	2010	Outstanding Writing for a Comedy Series	Greg Daniels and Mindy Kaling (for "Niagara")	Nominated	
Primetime Emmy Awards	2011	Outstanding Comedy Series	The Office (Note: Nominees: Ben Silverman, Greg Daniels, Ricky Gervais, Stephen Merchant, Howard Klein, Paul Lieberstein, and B. J. Novak (executive producers); Teri Weinberg, Mindy Kaling, Aaron Shure, Daniel Chun, and Peter Ocko (co-executive producers); Justin Spitzer and Charlie Grandy (supervising producers); Steve Carell, Warren Lieberstein, Halsted Sullivan, and Steve Hely (producers); Randy Cordray (produced by))	Nominated	
Primetime Emmy Awards	2011	Outstanding Lead Actor in a Comedy Series	Steve Carell	Nominated	
Primetime Emmy Awards	2011	Outstanding Writing for a Comedy Series	Greg Daniels (for "Goodbye, Michael")	Nominated	
Primetime Emmy Awards	2013	Outstanding Writing for a Comedy Series	Greg Daniels (for "Finale")	Nominated	
Primetime Creative Arts Emmy Awards	2006	Outstanding Single-Camera Picture Editing for a Comedy Series	Dean Holland (for "Booze Cruise")	Nominated	
Primetime Creative Arts Emmy Awards	2006	Outstanding Single-Camera Picture Editing for a Comedy Series	David Rogers (for "Christmas Party")	Nominated	
Primetime Creative Arts Emmy Awards	2007	Outstanding Single-Camera Picture Editing for a Comedy Series	David Rogers and Dean Holland (for "The Job")	Won	
Primetime Creative Arts Emmy Awards	2007	Outstanding Sound Mixing for a Comedy or Drama Series (Half-Hour) and Animation	Benjamin Patrick, John W. Cook II, and Peter Nusbaum (for "The Coup")	Nominated	
Primetime Creative Arts Emmy Awards	2008	Outstanding Picture Editing for a Comedy Series (Single or Multi-Camera)	Dean Holland and David Rogers (for "Goodbye, Toby")	Nominated	
Primetime Creative Arts Emmy Awards	2008	Outstanding Sound Mixing for a Comedy or Drama Series (Half-Hour) and Animation	Benjamin Patrick, John W. Cook II, and Peter Nusbaum (for "Local Ad")	Nominated	
Primetime Creative Arts Emmy Awards	2009	Outstanding Casting for a Comedy Series	Allison Jones	Nominated	
Primetime Creative Arts Emmy Awards	2009	Outstanding Creative Achievement in Interactive Media – Fiction	The Office Digital Experience (via NBC.com)	Nominated	
Primetime Creative Arts Emmy Awards	2009	Outstanding Picture Editing for a Comedy Series (Single or Multi-Camera)	Stuart Bass (for "Two Weeks")	Nominated	
Primetime Creative Arts Emmy Awards	2009	Outstanding Picture Editing for a Comedy Series (Single or Multi-Camera)	David Rogers and Dean Holland (for "Stress Relief")	Nominated	
Primetime Creative Arts Emmy Awards	2009	Outstanding Picture Editing for a Comedy Series (Single or Multi-Camera)	Claire Scanlon (for "Dream Team")	Nominated	
Primetime Creative Arts Emmy Awards	2009	Outstanding Sound Mixing for a Comedy or Drama Series (Half-Hour) and Animation	Benjamin Patrick, John W. Cook II, and Peter Nusbaum (for "Michael Scott Paper Company")	Nominated	
Primetime Creative Arts Emmy Awards	2010	Outstanding Sound Mixing for a Comedy or Drama Series (Half-Hour) and Animation	Benjamin Patrick, John W. Cook II, and Peter Nusbaum (for "Niagara")	Nominated	
Primetime Creative Arts Emmy Awards	2011	Outstanding Sound Mixing for a Comedy or Drama Series (Half-Hour) and Animation	Benjamin Patrick, John W. Cook II, and Peter Nusbaum (for "Andy's Play")	Nominated	
Primetime Creative Arts Emmy Awards	2013	Outstanding Single-Camera Picture Editing for a Comedy Series	David Rogers and Claire Scanlon (for "Finale")	Won	
Primetime Creative Arts Emmy Awards	2013	Outstanding Sound Mixing for a Comedy or Drama Series (Half-Hour) and Animation	Benjamin Patrick, John W. Cook II, and Peter Nusbaum (for "Finale")	Nominated	
Primetime Creative Arts Emmy Awards	2013	Outstanding Special Class – Short-Format Nonfiction Programs	The Office: The Farewells (via NBC.com) (Note: Nominees: John Krasinski, Carole Angelo, and Daniel Stessen (producers))	Nominated	
Prism Awards	2007	Comedy Series Episode	The Office (for "Drug Testing")	Nominated	
Prism Awards	2007	Performance in a Comedy Series	Steve Carell	Nominated	
Prism Awards	2009	Comedy Multi-Episode Storyline	The Office (for "Night Out", "Goodbye, Toby", "Weight Loss", and "Business Ethics")	Won	
Prism Awards	2009	Performance in a Comedy Series	B. J. Novak	Nominated	
Producers Guild of America Awards	2007	Danny Thomas Producer of the Year Award in Episodic Television – Comedy	The Office (Note: Nominees: Greg Daniels and Kent Zbornak)	Won	
Producers Guild of America Awards	2008	Danny Thomas Producer of the Year Award in Episodic Television – Comedy	The Office (Note: Nominees: Greg Daniels and Kent Zbornak)	Nominated	
Producers Guild of America Awards	2009	Danny Thomas Producer of the Year Award in Episodic Television – Comedy	The Office (Note: Nominees: Greg Daniels and Kent Zbornak)	Nominated	
Producers Guild of America Awards	2010	Danny Thomas Producer of the Year Award in Episodic Television – Comedy	The Office (Note: Nominees: Greg Daniels, Howard Klein, Paul Lieberstein, Jennifer Celotta, Paul Feig, Jake Aust, and Randy Cordray)	Nominated	
Producers Guild of America Awards	2011	Danny Thomas Award for Outstanding Producer of Episodic Television – Comedy	The Office (Note: Nominees: Randy Cordray, Greg Daniels, Howard Klein, and Paul Lieberstein)	Nominated	
Satellite Awards	2006	Best Television Series, Comedy or Musical	The Office	Nominated	
Satellite Awards	2006	Best Actor in a Series, Comedy or Musical	Steve Carell	Nominated	
Satellite Awards	2007	Best Actor in a Series, Comedy or Musical	Steve Carell	Nominated	
Satellite Awards	2007	Best DVD Release of a TV Show	The Office (for season 3)	Nominated	
Satellite Awards	2010	Best Actor in a Series, Comedy or Musical	Steve Carell	Nominated	
Satellite Awards	2012	Best Television Series, Comedy or Musical	The Office	Nominated	
Screen Actors Guild Awards	2007	Outstanding Performance by an Ensemble in a Comedy Series	The Office (Note: Nominees: Leslie David Baker, Brian Baumgartner, Steve Carell, David Denman, Jenna Fischer, Kate Flannery, Melora Hardin, Mindy Kaling, Angela Kinsey, John Krasinski, Paul Lieberstein, B. J. Novak, Oscar Nunez, Phyllis Smith, and Rainn Wilson)	Won	
Screen Actors Guild Awards	2007	Outstanding Performance by a Male Actor in a Comedy Series	Steve Carell	Nominated	
Screen Actors Guild Awards	2008	Outstanding Performance by an Ensemble in a Comedy Series	The Office (Note: Nominees: Leslie David Baker, Brian Baumgartner, Creed Bratton, Steve Carell, Jenna Fischer, Kate Flannery, Melora Hardin, Ed Helms, Mindy Kaling, Angela Kinsey, John Krasinski, Paul Lieberstein, B. J. Novak, Oscar Nunez, Phyllis Smith, and Rainn Wilson)	Won	
Screen Actors Guild Awards	2008	Outstanding Performance by a Male Actor in a Comedy Series	Steve Carell	Nominated	
Screen Actors Guild Awards	2009	Outstanding Performance by an Ensemble in a Comedy Series	The Office (Note: Nominees: Leslie David Baker, Brian Baumgartner, Creed Bratton, Steve Carell, Jenna Fischer, Kate Flannery, Melora Hardin, Ed Helms, Mindy Kaling, Angela Kinsey, John Krasinski, Paul Lieberstein, B. J. Novak, Oscar Nunez, Craig Robinson, Phyllis Smith, and Rainn Wilson)	Nominated	
Screen Actors Guild Awards	2009	Outstanding Performance by a Male Actor in a Comedy Series	Steve Carell	Nominated	
Screen Actors Guild Awards	2010	Outstanding Performance by an Ensemble in a Comedy Series	The Office (Note: Nominees: Leslie David Baker, Brian Baumgartner, Creed Bratton, Steve Carell, Jenna Fischer, Kate Flannery, Ed Helms, Mindy Kaling, Ellie Kemper, Angela Kinsey, John Krasinski, Paul Lieberstein, B. J. Novak, Oscar Nunez, Craig Robinson, Phyllis Smith, and Rainn Wilson)	Nominated	
Screen Actors Guild Awards	2010	Outstanding Performance by a Male Actor in a Comedy Series	Steve Carell	Nominated	
Screen Actors Guild Awards	2011	Outstanding Performance by an Ensemble in a Comedy Series	The Office (Note: Nominees: Leslie David Baker, Brian Baumgartner, Creed Bratton, Steve Carell, Jenna Fischer, Kate Flannery, Ed Helms, Mindy Kaling, Ellie Kemper, Angela Kinsey, John Krasinski, Paul Lieberstein, B. J. Novak, Oscar Nunez, Craig Robinson, Phyllis Smith, Rainn Wilson, and Zach Woods)	Nominated	
Screen Actors Guild Awards	2011	Outstanding Performance by a Male Actor in a Comedy Series	Steve Carell	Nominated	
Screen Actors Guild Awards	2012	Outstanding Performance by an Ensemble in a Comedy Series	The Office (Note: Nominees: Leslie David Baker, Brian Baumgartner, Creed Bratton, Steve Carell, Jenna Fischer, Kate Flannery, Ed Helms, Mindy Kaling, Ellie Kemper, Angela Kinsey, John Krasinski, Paul Lieberstein, B. J. Novak, Oscar Nunez, Craig Robinson, Phyllis Smith, James Spader, Rainn Wilson, and Zach Woods)	Nominated	
Screen Actors Guild Awards	2012	Outstanding Performance by a Male Actor in a Comedy Series	Steve Carell	Nominated	
Screen Actors Guild Awards	2013	Outstanding Performance by an Ensemble in a Comedy Series	The Office (Note: Nominees: Leslie David Baker, Brian Baumgartner, Creed Bratton, Clark Duke, Jenna Fischer, Kate Flannery, Ed Helms, Mindy Kaling, Ellie Kemper, Angela Kinsey, John Krasinski, Jake Lacy, Paul Lieberstein, B. J. Novak, Oscar Nunez, Craig Robinson, Phyllis Smith, Catherine Tate, and Rainn Wilson)	Nominated	
Teen Choice Awards	2006	Choice TV Actor: Comedy	Steve Carell	Nominated	
Teen Choice Awards	2007	Choice TV Show: Comedy	The Office	Nominated	
Teen Choice Awards	2007	Choice TV Actor: Comedy	Steve Carell	Won	
Teen Choice Awards	2008	Choice TV Actor: Comedy	Steve Carell	Won	
Teen Choice Awards	2009	Choice TV Show: Comedy	The Office	Nominated	
Teen Choice Awards	2009	Choice TV Actor: Comedy	Steve Carell	Nominated	
Teen Choice Awards	2009	Choice TV Actress: Comedy	Jenna Fischer	Nominated	
Teen Choice Awards	2010	Choice TV Actor: Comedy	Steve Carell	Nominated	
Teen Choice Awards	2011	Choice TV Actor: Comedy	Steve Carell	Nominated	
Teen Choice Awards	2011	Choice TV Actor: Comedy	John Krasinski	Nominated	
Teen Choice Awards	2019	Choice Throwback TV Show	The Office	Nominated	
Television Critics Association Awards	2006	Program of the Year	The Office	Nominated	
Television Critics Association Awards	2006	Outstanding Achievement in Comedy	The Office	Won	
Television Critics Association Awards	2006	Individual Achievement in Comedy	Steve Carell	Won	
Television Critics Association Awards	2007	Outstanding Achievement in Comedy	The Office	Won	
Television Critics Association Awards	2008	Outstanding Achievement in Comedy	The Office	Nominated	
Television Critics Association Awards	2009	Outstanding Achievement in Comedy	The Office	Nominated	
Television Critics Association Awards	2009	Individual Achievement in Comedy	Steve Carell	Nominated	
TV Land Awards	2008	Future Classic Award	The Office	Won	
Writers Guild of America Awards	2006	Television: New Series	The Office (Note: Nominees: Jennifer Celotta, Greg Daniels, Lee Eisenberg, Ricky Gervais, Mindy Kaling, Paul Lieberstein, Stephen Merchant, B. J. Novak, Michael Schur, Gene Stupnitsky, and Larry Wilmore)	Nominated	
Writers Guild of America Awards	2006	Television: Comedy Series	The Office	Nominated	
Writers Guild of America Awards	2006	Television: Episodic Comedy	B. J. Novak (for "Diversity Day")	Nominated	
Writers Guild of America Awards	2007	Television: Comedy Series	The Office (Note: Nominees: Steve Carell, Jennifer Celotta, Greg Daniels, Lee Eisenberg, Brent Forrester, Ricky Gervais, Mindy Kaling, Paul Lieberstein, Stephen Merchant, B. J. Novak, Michael Schur, Justin Spitzer, and Gene Stupnitsky)	Won	
Writers Guild of America Awards	2007	Television: Episodic Comedy	Steve Carell (for "Casino Night")	Won	
Writers Guild of America Awards	2007	Television: Episodic Comedy	Paul Lieberstein (for "The Coup")	Nominated	
Writers Guild of America Awards	2008	Television: Comedy Series	The Office (Note: Nominees: Steve Carell, Jennifer Celotta, Greg Daniels, Lee Eisenberg, Anthony Q. Farrell, Brent Forrester, Mindy Kaling, Ryan Koh, Lester Lewis, Paul Lieberstein, B. J. Novak, Michael Schur, Justin Spitzer, Gene Stupnitsky, Caroline Williams, and Larry Wilmore)	Nominated	
Writers Guild of America Awards	2008	Television: Episodic Comedy	Paul Lieberstein and Michael Schur (for "The Job")	Won	
Writers Guild of America Awards	2008	Television: Episodic Comedy	B. J. Novak (for "Local Ad")	Nominated	
Writers Guild of America Awards	2008	Television: Episodic Comedy	Caroline Williams (for "Phyllis' Wedding")	Nominated	
Writers Guild of America Awards	2009	Television: Comedy Series	The Office (Note: Nominees: Steve Carell, Jennifer Celotta, Greg Daniels, Lee Eisenberg, Brent Forrester, Dan Goor, Charlie Grandy, Mindy Kaling, Ryan Koh, Lester Lewis, Paul Lieberstein, Warren Lieberstein, B. J. Novak, Michael Schur, Aaron Shure, Justin Spitzer, Gene Stupnitsky, and Halsted Sullivan)	Nominated	
Writers Guild of America Awards	2009	Television: Episodic Comedy	Charlie Grandy (for "Crime Aid")	Nominated	
Writers Guild of America Awards	2010	Television: Comedy Series	The Office (Note: Nominees: Jennifer Celotta, Daniel Chun, Greg Daniels, Lee Eisenberg, Anthony Q. Farrell, Brent Forrester, Dan Goor, Charlie Grandy, Mindy Kaling, Ryan Koh, Lester Lewis, Paul Lieberstein, Warren Lieberstein, B. J. Novak, Michael Schur, Aaron Shure, Justin Spitzer, Gene Stupnitsky, and Halsted Sullivan)	Nominated	
Writers Guild of America Awards	2010	Television: Episodic Comedy	Charlie Grandy (for "Broke")	Nominated	
Writers Guild of America Awards	2010	Television: Episodic Comedy	Paul Lieberstein (for "Gossip")	Nominated	
Writers Guild of America Awards	2011	Television: Comedy Series	The Office (Note: Nominees: Jennifer Celotta, Daniel Chun, Greg Daniels, Lee Eisenberg, Brent Forrester, Amelie Gillette, Charlie Grandy, Steve Hely, Jonathan A. Hughes, Mindy Kaling, Carrie Kemper, Jason Kessler, Paul Lieberstein, Warren Lieberstein, B. J. Novak, Peter Ocko, Robert Padnick, Aaron Shure, Justin Spitzer, Gene Stupnitsky, Halsted Sullivan, and Jon Vitti)	Nominated	
Writers Guild of America Awards	2011	Television: Episodic Comedy	Aaron Shure (for "WUPHF.com")	Nominated	
Writers Guild of America Awards	2012	Television: Episodic Comedy	Greg Daniels (for "Goodbye, Michael, Part 2")	Nominated	
Writers Guild of America Awards	2012	Television: Episodic Comedy	Robert Padnick (for "PDA")	Nominated	
