= The Office (American TV series) season 4 =

Season of television series

The Office
- Season 4
- DVD cover
- Showrunner: Greg Daniels
- Starring: Steve Carell; Rainn Wilson; John Krasinski; Jenna Fischer; B. J. Novak; Melora Hardin; Ed Helms; Leslie David Baker; Brian Baumgartner; Creed Bratton; Kate Flannery; Mindy Kaling; Angela Kinsey; Paul Lieberstein; Oscar Nunez; Craig Robinson; Phyllis Smith
- No. of episodes: 19

Release
- Original network: NBC
- Original release: September 27, 2007 – May 15, 2008

Season chronology
- ← Previous; Season 3 Next → Season 5

The fourth season of the American television comedy The Office premiered in the United States on NBC on September 27, 2007, and concluded on May 15, 2008. The season consisted of 9 half-hour episodes, and 5 hour-long episodes to comprise the 19 total episodes of material created. The Office is an American adaptation of the British TV series of the same name, and is presented in a mockumentary format, portraying the daily lives of office employees in the Scranton, Pennsylvania branch of the fictitious Dunder Mifflin Paper Company. The season was originally set to include 30 episodes, but due to the 2007–2008 Writers Guild of America strike, production was called to a halt, in result, the season was shortened to 19 episodes. It stars Steve Carell, Rainn Wilson, John Krasinski, Jenna Fischer, and B. J. Novak, with supporting performances from Melora Hardin, Ed Helms, Leslie David Baker, Brian Baumgartner, Creed Bratton, Kate Flannery, Mindy Kaling, Angela Kinsey, Paul Lieberstein, Oscar Nunez, Craig Robinson, and Phyllis Smith.

This season marked the departure of Karen Filippelli (Rashida Jones) as a regular character, although she appeared for a few seconds in the first episode, "Fun Run" and in the tenth episode, "Branch Wars", as the regional manager of the Utica branch. Relationships again emerged as the main theme of the season, with Jim Halpert (John Krasinski) and Pam Beesly's (Jenna Fischer) rising, and Michael Scott (Steve Carell) and Jan Levinson's (Melora Hardin), as well as Dwight Schrute (Rainn Wilson) and Angela Martin's (Angela Kinsey) declining. Technology was another prevalent theme as the office staff struggled with initiatives introduced by Ryan Howard (B. J. Novak) to modernize the company.

The fourth season of The Office aired on Thursdays at 9:00 p.m. (Eastern) in the United States. The season marked a slight drop in ratings compared to the previous two seasons. Critical reception to the season continued to be largely positive. The season was released on DVD by Universal Studios Home Entertainment in a four-disc box set in the Region 1 area on September 2, 2008. The DVD set contains all 19 episodes, as well as commentaries from creators, writers, actors, and directors on some of the episodes. It also contains deleted scenes from all of the episodes, as well as bloopers and other promos.

== Production ==
The fourth season of the show was produced by Reveille Productions and Deedle-Dee Productions, both in association with Universal Media Studios. The show is based upon the British series created by Ricky Gervais and Stephen Merchant, both of whom are executive producers on both the US and UK versions. The Office is produced by Greg Daniels, who is also an executive producer and the showrunner. All the writers from the previous season returned, with the writing staff consisting of Daniels, Michael Schur, Lester Lewis, Mindy Kaling, B. J. Novak, Paul Lieberstein, Lee Eisenberg, Gene Stupnitsky, Jennifer Celotta, Brent Forrester, and Justin Spitzer. Schur, Lieberstein and Celotta were co-executive producers; Kaling, Eisenberg and Stupnitsky were producers; Novak and Lewis were supervising producers; and Forrester was a consulting producer.

This season featured 19 half-hour segments which were combined and aired to produce 14 distinct episodes, directed by 11 directors. Greg Daniels, Craig Zisk, Ken Whittingham, Paul Lieberstein, Jason Reitman, Joss Whedon, Paul Feig, Julian Farino, Jeffrey Blitz, Randall Einhorn, and Tucker Gates each directed episodes during the season, with Feig and Whittingham directing multiple episodes. Although The Office was mainly filmed on a studio set at Valley Center Studios in Van Nuys, California, the city of Scranton, Pennsylvania, where the show is set, was also used for shots of the opening theme.

Originally, NBC ordered a full season of 30 episodes. After 12 episodes were filmed, production was suspended due to the effects of the 2007–2008 Writers Guild of America strike. The Writers Guild of America (WGA) went on strike at 12:01 a.m. Eastern Standard Time on November 5, 2007. Filming of The Office immediately halted on that date, as Steve Carell, who is a member of the WGA, refused to cross WGA picket lines. Members of Writers Guild of America, East and Writers Guild of America, West voted to end the 100-day strike on February 12, 2008, and writers were allowed to return to work on the same day. The WGA allowed for showrunners to return to work on February 11, in preparation for the conclusion of the strike. The showrunner for The Office, Greg Daniels, returned on February 11, and the show's writers returned to work on February 13. The duration of the strike resulted in a script of a Christmas-themed episode being discarded, as production of the episode was due to start the week that the strike began. The basic premise of the Christmas episode, which revolved around the German folk character Belsnickel, was later purposely recycled and reused in the ninth season entry "Dwight Christmas".

== Season overview ==
Notable ongoing subplots that affect the fourth season and beyond include:

- Jim Halpert and Pam Beesly starting their romantic relationship
- Ryan Howard's promotion to a corporate position
- Michael Scott's deteriorating relationship with Jan Levinson and his subsequent search for a new love interest
- Dwight Schrute's breakup with Angela Martin after he euthanizes one of her cats
- Andy Bernard's pursuing of Angela, unaware of her lingering feelings for Dwight
- Toby Flenderson's moving to Costa Rica, leading to the arrival of new HR rep Holly Flax

== Cast ==
Many characters portrayed by The Office cast are based on the British version of the show. While these characters normally have the same attitude and perceptions as their British counterparts, the roles have been redesigned to better fit the American show. The show is known for its generally large cast size, with many of its actors and actresses known particularly for their improvisational work.

=== Main ===
- Steve Carell as Michael Scott, Regional Manager of the Dunder Mifflin Scranton Branch. Loosely based on David Brent, Gervais' character in the British version, Scott is a dim-witted and lonely man, who attempts to win friends as the office comedian, usually making himself look bad in the process.
- Rainn Wilson as Dwight Schrute, who, based upon Gareth Keenan, is the office's top-performing sales representative.
- John Krasinski as Jim Halpert, a sales representative, assistant manager, and prankster, who is based upon Tim Canterbury, and is in love with Pam, the receptionist.
- Jenna Fischer as Pam Beesly, who is based on Dawn Tinsley, is shy, but in many cases a cohort with Jim in his pranks on Dwight.
- B. J. Novak as Ryan Howard, who for the first two seasons is a temporary worker, but is promoted to sales representative in the third season and later ascends to the position of Vice President, North East Region and Director of New Media.

=== Starring ===
- Melora Hardin as Jan Levinson, a former Dunder Mifflin employee and Michael's girlfriend.
- Ed Helms as Andy Bernard, a preppy salesman with anger issues.
- Leslie David Baker as Stanley Hudson, a grumpy salesman.
- Brian Baumgartner as Kevin Malone, a dim-witted accountant, based on Keith Bishop.
- Creed Bratton as Creed Bratton, the office's strange quality assurance officer.
- Kate Flannery as Meredith Palmer, the promiscuous supplier relations representative.
- Mindy Kaling as Kelly Kapoor, the pop-culture obsessed customer service representative.
- Angela Kinsey as Angela Martin, a judgemental accountant and Dwight's main love interest.
- Paul Lieberstein as Toby Flenderson, the sad-eyed human resources representative.
- Oscar Nunez as Oscar Martinez, an intelligent accountant, who is also gay.
- Craig Robinson as Darryl Philbin, the warehouse manager.
- Phyllis Smith as Phyllis Vance, a motherly saleswoman.

=== Recurring ===
- Andy Buckley as David Wallace, Dunder Mifflin's CFO.
- Bobby Ray Shafer as Bob Vance, Phyllis’ husband, who runs Vance Refrigeration.
- Hugh Dane as Hank Tate, the building's security guard.

=== Notable guests ===
- Rashida Jones as Karen Filippelli, Jim's ex-girlfriend, who is now regional manager of the Utica branch.
- Amy Ryan as Holly Flax, Toby's replacement in human resources.

== Reception ==
=== Ratings ===
The fourth-season premiere "Fun Run" received a 5.1/12 share in the Nielsen ratings among viewers aged 18 to 49, meaning that 5.1% of viewers aged 18 to 49 watched the episode, and 12% of viewers watching television at the time watched the episode. "Fun Run" attracted 9.7 million viewers overall. Both of these figures built upon the marks set by the third-season finale "The Job". In the weeks following "Fun Run", The Office never received more than nine million viewers. After the Writers Strike, The Office once again eclipsed the nine million viewers mark, when the episode "Dinner Party" received 9.3 million viewers. The episode "Chair Model", the second episode to be released after the end of the strike garnered 9.9 million viewers, a high for the fourth season. While the episode "Job Fair" received the lowest number of viewers for the season, at 7.2 million, it and the episode following it, the season finale "Goodbye Toby", both scored the highest viewer percentage increase among digital video recording users for their respective weeks.

The season ranked as the seventy-seventh most watched television series during the 2007–2008 season, with an average of 8.04 million viewers; this marked a decrease in ranking and viewership from the previous season, which had ranked as the sixty-eighth most-watched series.

=== Critical review ===
"While 'The Deposition' was the high point in the season, there were several terrific episodes. 'Money' showed us a glimpse of Dwight's frightening home life on the Schrute beet farm. 'Local Ad' is a fun episode that shows us Michael's true passion for what he does. When the team put together what is actually a clever little commercial, it includes the well meaning but misguided catchphrase 'Dunder Mifflin, limitless paper in a paper-less world.' The episode also featured Dwight's adventures in Second Life–where he's a paper salesman who plays 'Second Second Life'."

— Reviews website IGN

The fourth season received critical acclaim. Travis Fickett, a reviewer from IGN, praised the writing and the acting of season 4. When speaking of the season finale "Goodbye Toby", Fickett said "It's a great episode that ends a great season. There are more than a few questions raised that will have us eagerly tuning in when the show returns in the fall." Aubry D'Arminio praised the season, but she also showed disapproval at what she felt was a lack of use for some of The Office's supporting cast in the episodes directly following the Writers' Strike, saying "I just feel a bit sad that, minus Leslie David Baker's Stanley, these excellent actors/characters haven't been highlighted nearly enough since the series' return in April." In a comprehensive review of the fourth season DVD, IGN reviewers Travis Fickett and Phil Pirrello both believed "this season to be one of the show's best, [but felt] that 14 episodes across four discs give way to crowding, especially when the season tries to tackle Jim and Pam dating, Angela and Dwight breaking up, Andy and Angela dating by way of awkward silence, Michael and Jan breaking up, Toby leaving the office and a new love interest for Michael joining the cast." Fickett and Pirrello gave the season a total score of 8 out of 10.

=== Honors ===
The Office received eight nominations at the 60th Primetime Emmy Awards. The show's producers received a nomination for "Outstanding Comedy Series", while Paul Lieberstein and Paul Feig both received nominations for "Outstanding Directing for a Comedy Series", for the episodes "Money" and "Goodbye, Toby", respectively. For his portrayal of Michael Scott, Carell received a nomination for "Outstanding Lead Actor in a Comedy Series", and for his portrayal of Dwight Schrute, Wilson received a nomination for "Outstanding Supporting Actor in a Comedy Series". Dean Holland and Dave Rogers both received a nomination for "Outstanding Picture Editing For A Comedy Series (Single Or Multi-camera)" for their work on "Goodbye, Toby", while Ben Patrick, John W. Cook III, and Peter J. Nusbaum were all nominated in the "Outstanding Sound Mixing For A Comedy Or Drama Series (half-hour) And Animation" category for their work on the episode "Local Ad". For the episode "Dinner Party", the creative writing team of Gene Stupnitsky and Lee Eisenberg received a nomination for "Outstanding Writing for a Comedy Series".

== Episodes ==
In the following table, "U.S. viewers (million)" refers to the number of Americans who viewed the episode on the night of broadcast. Episodes are listed by the order in which they aired, and may not necessarily correspond to their production codes.

No. overall	No. in season	Title	Directed by	Written by	Original release date	Prod. code	U.S. viewers (millions)
54	1	"Fun Run"^{‡}	Greg Daniels	Greg Daniels	September 27, 2007	4001	9.65
55	2	"Fun Run"^{‡}	Greg Daniels	Greg Daniels	September 27, 2007	4002	9.65
After Michael hits Meredith with his car in the carpark of Dunder Mifflin Scranton, she learns she is infected with rabies. Angela asks Dwight to care for her sick cat, but Dwight mercy-kills the animal, leading to relationship problems. After being videoed in public by the camera crew, Pam announces that she and Jim are now dating, but they do not share this with their co-workers. Feeling guilty about the incident with Meredith, Michael decides to host "Michael Scott's Dunder Mifflin Scranton Meredith Palmer Memorial Celebrity Rabies Awareness Pro-Am Fun Run Race For The Cure", although his employees are less than enthused. The donation for the run only amounts to $500, out of which Michael ends up spending around $250 on a big cheque and fake nurse. Toby wins the race, and a depressed and dehydrated Michael is finally forgiven by Meredith.
56	3	"Dunder Mifflin Infinity"^{‡}	Craig Zisk	Michael Schur	October 4, 2007	4003	8.57
57	4	"Dunder Mifflin Infinity"^{‡}	Craig Zisk	Michael Schur	October 4, 2007	4004	8.57
Jim and Pam's relationship is outed to the rest of the office after a jealous Toby files a PDA complaint. Ryan returns to the offices for the first time since his promotion to introduce "Dunder Mifflin Infinity", his plan to use technology to revitalize the uncompetitive company. Creed warns Michael of the possible effects this change will have with older workers, leading Michael to hold an "ageism seminar". Meanwhile, Kelly tries to trick Ryan into getting back together with her. Michael, believing the personal touch is more important than technology, leaves with Dwight to present food gift baskets to seven former clients to try to win them back. After presenting six of the baskets with no luck, Michael gets frustrated and causes a scene at a client's office. On their return, unable to properly understand his rental car's GPS, Michael drives it into Lake Scranton.
58	5	"Launch Party"^{‡}	Ken Whittingham	Jennifer Celotta	October 11, 2007	4005	8.87
59	6	"Launch Party"^{‡}	Ken Whittingham	Jennifer Celotta	October 11, 2007	4006	8.87
As the new brainchild of Ryan, the new Dunder Mifflin Infinity website, is about to be released, the staff of Dunder Mifflin Scranton prepare to host a party as part of a company-wide video chat room. Dwight, wanting to prove to Angela that he can beat technology, tries to outsell the new computer, which he ultimately does. Michael misunderstands an invite to the digital party as an invite to the actual party in New York. Later, at the party, Dwight and Michael kidnap a pizza delivery boy, although they later release him. At the end of the chat room, Michael humiliates Ryan in front of every branch of Dunder Mifflin. Andy decides to pursue Angela, to Dwight's dismay.
60	7	"Money"^{‡}	Paul Lieberstein	Paul Lieberstein	October 18, 2007	4007	8.61
61	8	"Money"^{‡}	Paul Lieberstein	Paul Lieberstein	October 18, 2007	4008	8.61
When Jan, now living with Michael in his condominium, forces costly changes in Michael's life, he worries about his financial situation. To remedy the problem, Michael leaves work early for a late night job as a telemarketer until 1 a.m. When Ryan finds out, he forces Michael to quit the second job or he'll be fired from Dunder Mifflin, who then fears that there is no way that he can support Jan and himself. He hops a train to run away, but Jan meets him and tells him that they can work together to find a way to live. Meanwhile, Dwight pines over Angela, who is later asked out by Andy. After a pep-talk by Jim, Dwight returns as his normal annoying self, to Jim's pleasure. Pam and Jim visit Dwight's family farm, which he has fashioned into a bed and breakfast.
62	9	"Local Ad"	Jason Reitman	B. J. Novak	October 25, 2007	4009	8.96
Although informed that he and his employees can only be in the Dunder Mifflin Infinity commercial for a few seconds, Michael decides to produce a full commercial with the Scranton staff. Meanwhile, the progression of Andy and Angela's relationship forces Dwight to sink into a depression, where he attempts to remove himself from his life by playing Second Life. Although rebuffed by the corporate office, Michael's rejected version of the Scranton commercial is well received by both the employees as well as other bar patrons at Poor Richard's.
63	10	"Branch Wars"	Joss Whedon	Mindy Kaling	November 1, 2007	4010	8.36
Karen, now Regional Manager of Dunder Mifflin Utica, attempts to lure Stanley away from Dunder Mifflin Scranton. Pranking Karen for her attempt, Michael and Dwight trick Jim into accompanying them on a "panty raid" to Utica. When they are discovered, Karen scolds them and is further angered when Jim informs her that he and Pam are now dating. Back at Scranton, Michael bids Stanley goodbye, who then tells Michael he's decided to stay, revealing that he only said he had left to try to get a raise.
64	11	"Survivor Man"	Paul Feig	Steve Carell	November 8, 2007	4011	8.27
When Michael is not invited to a company wilderness retreat hosted by Ryan, he decides to prove that he has the ability to survive on his own. Dwight drops Michael in the middle of a forest, and although told to leave, stays to prevent Michael from injury. When Michael almost eats poisonous mushrooms, Dwight jumps out to save him just in time. Meanwhile, back at the office, Jim, as the number two, decides to combine birthday parties for three members of the staff whose birthdays fall in quick succession. The plan, though, is poorly received by the staff, and Jim returns to having individual birthdays just as Michael and Dwight come back.
65	12	"The Deposition"	Julian Farino	Lester Lewis	November 15, 2007	4012	8.80
Michael is thrown in the middle of a deposition between Dunder Mifflin and his girlfriend Jan after Jan sues the company for wrongful termination. Although the case initially goes well for Jan, Michael's actions lead to Dunder Mifflin easily getting the upper hand. Meanwhile, back at Dunder Mifflin Scranton, a ping pong craze turns into a battle of the relationships between Pam and Jim and Kelly and Darryl.
66	13	"Dinner Party"	Paul Feig	Gene Stupnitsky & Lee Eisenberg	April 10, 2008	4013	9.33
Michael and Jan invite Jim, Pam, Andy, and Angela to a dinner party at the couple's condominium. When Michael and Jan begin to argue after the discussion of having children arises, the party's guests go to various measures to try to escape. The party is thrown into further confusion when Dwight, still pining for Angela, arrives with his former babysitter as his date. As the fighting between Michael and Jan escalates, the police are eventually called by a neighbor. The party culminates with Michael leaving Jan.
67	14	"Chair Model"	Jeffrey Blitz	B. J. Novak	April 17, 2008	4014	9.86
After seeing a model in a catalog while searching for a chair, Michael realizes that he has not accomplished his dream of finding a soul mate in life. Dwight embarks on a search for the chair model, while Michael takes names of friends of office employees for dates. Michael goes on a blind date with Pam's landlady, which ends poorly. Meanwhile, Andy and Kevin meet with the bosses of the other companies in the building to discuss the issues of parking, while Jim and Pam discuss the future of their relationship.
68	15	"Night Out"	Ken Whittingham	Mindy Kaling	April 24, 2008	4015	7.69
Michael and Dwight decide to surprise Ryan in New York and to meet his friends. They find him clubbing and join him for the night. Ryan is surprisingly friendly, though it could be a side effect of his cocaine habit. Meanwhile, the Scranton branch is upset when they find out they have to come in on a Saturday for Ryan's website project. Jim suggests that everyone work late instead. The plan goes well — until they find they are locked in on the grounds with no way to escape. Toby lets slip his affection for Pam and impulsively announces he will be moving to Costa Rica.
69	16	"Did I Stutter?"	Randall Einhorn	Brent Forrester & Justin Spitzer	May 1, 2008	4016	7.75
When Stanley snaps at Michael during a meeting, Michael tries to give Stanley an attitude adjustment. Michael's plan to fake-fire Stanley only worsens the situation. To punish Andy for his relationship with Angela, Dwight lowballs Andy to buy his car and then resells it for a profit. Meanwhile, Pam deals with unwanted attention from her "back up" glasses after spending the night at Jim's. Jim receives a formal warning from Ryan about his job performance.
70	17	"Job Fair"	Tucker Gates	Lee Eisenberg & Gene Stupnitsky	May 8, 2008	4017	7.16
In response to Ryan's warning, Jim hits the links with Andy and Kevin to attempt to land his biggest client ever. Michael, Pam, Oscar, and Darryl set up a booth at a job fair at Pam's old high school to find applicants for Dunder Mifflin's summer internship, but Michael's shenanigans produce failure. When all the other office workers duck out early, Dwight and Angela have a tense day alone in the office. Pam investigates graphic arts opportunities which may take her away from Scranton.
71	18	"Goodbye, Toby"^{‡}	Paul Feig	Jennifer Celotta & Paul Lieberstein	May 15, 2008	4018	8.21
72	19	"Goodbye, Toby"^{‡}	Paul Feig	Jennifer Celotta & Paul Lieberstein	May 15, 2008	4019	8.21
After Angela refuses to give in to Michael's unreasonable demands, Phyllis takes over the party planning committee and throws a huge bash for Toby's goodbye party. Dwight, with Meredith, hazes the new HR woman, Holly Flax (Amy Ryan), making her think Kevin is mentally disabled. Holly and Michael seem to make a romantic connection, which is cut short when Jan returns from Arizona, pregnant from a sperm donor; Michael ambivalently agrees to help her through the birth process. Pam accepts a three month training program in New York, and just as Jim is about to propose to her, Andy publicly proposes to Angela who reluctantly agrees. Angela is later caught by Phyllis, having sex with Dwight in the office. Ryan's downfall is complete as he is dragged from the New York office after committing fraud related to the website.

^‡ denotes an hour-long episode (with advertisements; actual runtime around 42 minutes).

== Home media ==
The Office: The Complete Fourth Season
Set details	Special features
19 episodes; 4-disc set; 1.78:1 aspect ratio; Subtitles: English, Spanish; English (Dolby Digital 5.1 Surround)	Commentary on 4 episodes by the actors, writers, and producers; Deleted scenes from every episode; Blooper Reel; The Office Convention "Writers' Block Panel Discussion"
Release dates
Region 1	Region 2
September 2, 2008	June 14, 2010
