= Night Out (The Office) =

- The Office episode
- Jim, Pam and Toby locked in the building
- Episode no.: Season 4 Episode 15
- Directed by: Ken Whittingham
- Written by: Mindy Kaling
- Cinematography by: Randall Einhorn
- Editing by: David Rogers
- Production code: 415
- Original air date: April 24, 2008
- Running time: 21 minutes

Guest appearance
- Hugh Dane as Hank Tate

Episode chronology
← Previous "Chair Model"	Next → "Did I Stutter?"
- The Office (American season 4)

"Night Out" is the fifteenth episode of the fourth season of the American comedy television series The Office and the show's sixty-eighth episode overall. The episode was written by Mindy Kaling and directed by Ken Whittingham. It first aired in the United States on April 24, 2008 on NBC. "Night Out" was viewed by a measured audience of over 7.5 million people, bringing in the lowest number of estimated viewers that The Office received among 12 episodes. "Night Out" received mixed reviews from critics.

In the episode, Michael Scott (Steve Carell) and Dwight Schrute (Rainn Wilson) travel to New York City to party with Ryan Howard (B. J. Novak). Ryan starts acting erratically due to the influence of drugs. Meanwhile, the remaining employees are going to be forced to work on a Saturday. Jim Halpert (John Krasinski) proposes that they work late on Friday, so they do not have to come in the next day, but forgets to inform the security guard, causing them to be locked in.

== Plot ==
Ryan Howard arrives at the Scranton, Pennsylvania branch of the Dunder Mifflin Paper Company and is greeted with hostility due to problems with his new website, in particular that the site was shut down because sexual predators had invaded the social networking component, preventing staff from logging their sales as website sales, and Ryan has ordered them to work on Saturday re-entering those sales. Michael Scott asks him if he could set him up with the women he meets in clubs in New York City, and he says no.

Michael and Dwight Schrute go to the New York club Ryan frequents to locate Ryan, party with him, and meet women. Ryan is thrilled to see them but appears to be under the influence of drugs, though Michael and Dwight do not notice. Later, Michael, Dwight, Ryan and Ryan's colleague Troy Underbridge visit another club, which does not allow anyone in who does not have a date. Dwight pairs each of them with members of a women's basketball team who are waiting in line. Inside the club, Ryan's dancing becomes erratic, and he accidentally hits a girl, prompting her friends to attack him. Dwight and Michael escort him out of the club. Troy advises them not to take Ryan to a hospital, and runs off. Michael and Dwight bring Ryan back to his apartment. He tells them that he thinks Troy has a drug problem, and asks what he should do about it. Michael, oblivious to the fact that Ryan is referring to his own drug addiction, gives him hypothetical advice involving a wiretap and snitching on a drug dealer.

Back in Scranton, Jim Halpert suggests everyone stay in the office late instead of coming in for the Saturday. They all agree to the plan, but Jim forgets to tell Hank the security guard they are staying late. After working until 9:00 pm, they find the parking lot gates locked, and are unable to return to the office because Pam Beesly locked the door from the inside, and Dwight has both the spare and master keys. Jim calls Hank, who puts off coming to let them out because Jim neglected to collect money for his last annual tip. Pam accidentally injures Meredith by hitting her head with a football that was found in the parking lot. Sitting in the lobby area waiting for Hank to arrive, the employees vote by a show of hands that Andy and Angela are a better couple than Jim and Pam.

During a moment of levity, Toby Flenderson reaches over and feels Pam's knee. After an awkward silence, Toby proclaims that he is moving to Costa Rica; he then climbs the parking lot fence and runs away. The cleaning staff arrives and lets the group out with help from Oscar, who speaks Spanish.

Hank is incredulous when he arrives at the office to find everyone but the cleaning staff is gone.

== Production ==
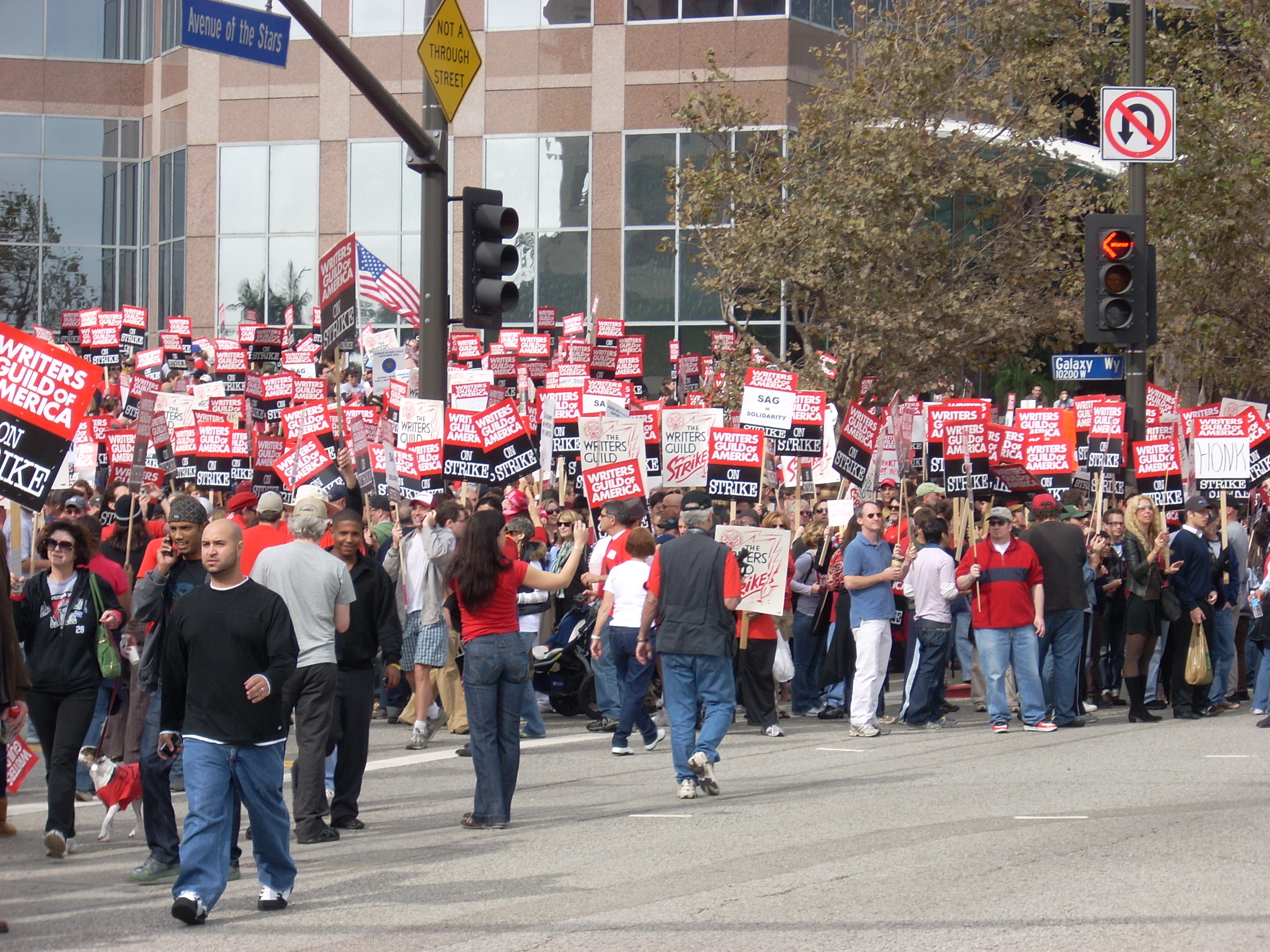
The Writers Guild of America was on strike for 100 days, causing production of The Office to go on hiatus for four months.

"Night Out" was the seventh episode of the series directed by Ken Whittingham. It was written by Mindy Kaling, who also acts in the show as customer-service representative Kelly Kapoor. The episode was the eighth of the series to be written by Kaling. "Night Out" was the third new episode of The Office to be broadcast since the episode "The Deposition" on November 15, 2007, due to the effects of the 2007–2008 Writers Guild of America strike. Filming of The Office immediately halted on that date, because many members of the cast including Carell, Novak, Kaling, and Lieberstein are members of the WGA and refused to cross WGA picket lines. If not for the writers' strike, this episode would have most likely been filmed in November 2007.

Most of "Night Out" was shot during the night. The scene that has Toby putting his hand on Pam's knee was shot at 2:30 am on a Friday. The scene was shot about eight times because according to Kaling, "everyone kept breaking because Toby was so vulnerable and awkward." Kate Flannery did her stunts in the scene where Pam throws a football and hits Meredith Palmer (Flannery) in the face. Flannery had a stunt double on the set, but she was never needed for the scene. Kate recalls that she "didn't get a scratch in all 14 takes that we shot." Lieberstein on the other hand used a stunt double for the scene in which Toby climbs over the fence. Although Lieberstein offered to do the stunt himself, executive producer and show runner Greg Daniels decided against it.

When casting the basketball player who kisses Dwight, the show was looking for a female 6 feet 1 inch (185 cm) or taller. Actress Cassie Fliegel, who is 5 feet 11 inches (180 cm), auditioned for the part anyway. After getting a callback, Fliegel went to a gym to work out, attempting to gain muscle to look more like a basketball player. On the day of the callbacks, Fliegel remembers being next to an actress who was 6 feet 8 inches (203 cm). Despite her size, Fliegel, a former basketball player herself, was cast for the part. Initially, she did not know that her character was going to make out with Dwight. Fliegel recalls that when she first heard about kissing Dwight she "was like, I don't think so". However, after finding out that she had her own trailer, Fliegel warmed up to the idea. The music in the club was chosen by Novak, Kaling's then-boyfriend Benjamin Nugent, and Daniel Chun. When filming Ryan dancing in the club, the girl that Ryan hit was actually a stunt woman. Pads had been placed on the floor so Novak could fall down safely. The German lullaby that Dwight sang to Ryan was script supervisor Veda Semarne's idea. Semarne's Austrian grandmother sang the same song to her when she was a child.

== Reception ==
"Night Out" received 4.0/10 in the ages 18–49 demographic in the Nielsen ratings. This means that four percent of all households with an 18- to 49-year-old living in it watched the episode, and ten percent had their televisions tuned to the channel at any point. The episode was watched by 7.56 million viewers. "Night Out" did not do as well as "Chair Model" did the week before, losing 20 percent of the previous episode's viewers. Some attribute the loss of viewers to a lack of Grey's Anatomy and a repeat of CSI the previous week. With 7.69 million, "Night Out" had fewer viewers than any other episode of The Office from the fourth season, except for "Job Fair", which garnered only 7.16 million viewers.

Reviews for "Night Out" were mixed. Zap2It's Rick Porter thought that although it wasn't "as sublime in its Needy Michael-ness as last week's [episode]" and "in some ways, though, it was maybe even a little sadder", "Night Out" was "still pretty darn funny". Porter went on to praise the acting work of both B. J. Novak and Paul Lieberstein, as well as the writing of Mindy Kaling. TV Squad's Jay Black said that Michael summed up "Night Out" perfectly when he said "Best. Night. Ever." Black went on to praise both of the storylines, and the ability of the show to achieve success both in as well as out of the Dunder Mifflin Scranton building. Similar to Black's statements, Gretchen Hansen of Entertainment Weekly stated that "'Best. Night. Ever.' Oh, so true, Michael." She also stated that "I guess I knew it was going to be a good episode of The Office when I had two pages of scribbled notes before the first commercial break." Hansen went on to praise both the acting and the writing of the episode as points that contributed to the success of the episode. Rachel Cericola, of TV Fodder, praised the writing of the episode by Mindy Kaling. She also praised the storyline of the episode that did not involve Michael and Dwight, saying "The second plotline was its usual funny filler. However, it was Toby's revelation that made it all worthwhile."

Travis Fickett of IGN said that the episode was "still satisfying, even when it's not one of the show's funnier episodes", but "it's a bit of a shame this episode wasn't a home run, because having Dwight and Michael hit the clubs is a funny idea." Fickett went on to praise the episode's awkward moment between Toby and Pam, when Toby placed his hand on Pam's leg, and Toby's subsequent escape by hopping the fence. Fickett stated that, for Toby's growing love of Pam, and growing envy of Jim, "this is pretty great pay off". Claire Zulkey, a writer for the Los Angeles Times, was not as pleased with the episode. Zulkey wrote "that when it's at its zaniest, The Office is at its worst", and the episode was "just too silly to be funny". Zulkey did say that "it was hilarious to see him [Toby] let his hand more-than-linger on her knee and then abruptly flee the premises by jumping over the fence and running home." In a poll done by Office fansite OfficeTally.com, viewers ranked "Night Out" as the 13th-most popular episode out of the 14 episodes of season four.
