= Chair Model =

- The Office episode
- Episode no.: Season 4 Episode 14
- Directed by: Jeffrey Blitz
- Written by: B. J. Novak
- Cinematography by: Randall Einhorn
- Editing by: Dean Holland
- Production code: 414
- Original air date: April 17, 2008
- Running time: 22 minutes

Guest appearances
- Brooke Dillman as Margaret; Bobby Ray Shafer as Bob Vance

Episode chronology
← Previous "Dinner Party"	Next → "Night Out"
- The Office (American season 4)

"Chair Model" is the fourteenth episode of the fourth season of the American comedy television series The Office and the show's sixty-seventh episode overall. Written by B. J. Novak, and directed by Jeffrey Blitz, the episode first aired in the United States on April 17, 2008 on NBC. The episode guest-stars Brooke Dillman and Robert R. Shafer as Bob Vance.

The series depicts the everyday lives of office employees in the Scranton, Pennsylvania branch of the fictional Dunder Mifflin Paper Company. In the episode, Michael Scott (Steve Carell) finds himself lonely and wanting a relationship after breaking up with Jan Levinson (Melora Hardin). While looking through an office-supplies catalog, he falls in love with a chair model. Meanwhile, Kevin Malone (Brian Baumgartner) and Andy Bernard (Ed Helms) fight to reclaim lost parking spaces, and Jim Halpert (John Krasinski) tells Pam Beesly (Jenna Fischer) that he is going to propose.

The final scene was originally going to be a parody of "Candle in the Wind" by Elton John, but John refused permission. The scene was then re-written to feature a parody of the song "American Pie" by Don McLean. "Chair Model" received mostly positive reviews from critics, although some fans were alienated by the dark nature of the storyline. The episode received 5.8 Nielsen rating and was watched by 9.86 million viewers.

== Plot ==
While browsing an office-chair catalog, Michael Scott, who has broken up with Jan Levinson, becomes enamored of one of the female chair models. As a result, he decides to resume dating, going so far as threatening to fire the office employees if they do not help. No one in the office wants to set up any of their friends with Michael, but when Michael learns that the chair model died in a car crash some time ago, Pam Beesly takes pity and sets him up on a blind date with her landlady. The date does not go well, beginning with Michael pretending he is not who she was supposed to be meeting. After Michael admits his own blind date was a failure, Dwight Schrute convinces him that he needs closure on this person he loved who is gone. Dwight and Michael visit the grave of the chair model, where Michael "grieves". They both sing "American Pie" by Don McLean and dance on her grave.

With Michael busy, Kevin Malone and Andy Bernard work to reclaim parking spaces that they have lost to construction workers working in a neighboring office. They arrange a meeting with the bosses of the office park, and are given the parking spots back. Kevin feels happy to have won his space back, as his fiancée Stacy broke off their engagement and it has been a hard time for him.

Pam jokes to Jim Halpert that she will have to move in with him due to setting up her landlady with Michael, but when he agrees to it, she tells him seriously that she will not move in with anyone unless she is engaged. He replies that he is already planning to propose marriage to her in the near future. Pam is not sure if he is joking. Alone with the camera, Jim reveals that he was not joking and shows an engagement ring that he bought a week after they started dating. After work, while walking back to his car, he pranks her by getting down on one knee before asking her to wait while he ties his shoes.

== Production ==
"Chair Model" was the third episode of the series directed by Jeffrey Blitz. Blitz had previously directed "The Convict" and "The Negotiation". The episode was written by B. J. Novak, who plays temporary worker turned corporate manager Ryan Howard. Novak was originally going to name the episode "Michael Dating", but the title could have potentially been a spoiler because fans with DVRs would have seen it before "Dinner Party" aired and deduced that Michael and Jan's relationship had completely fallen apart. For a while, "Parking" was going to be the title, but even that was decided against because that refers to the subplot, and also because it was generic and boring even by the show's no-frills-titles standard. Eventually, someone suggested "Chair Model", which was eventually kept as the name. Originally, Novak wrote Jim putting Dwight through a "phony management training", but NBC pointed out that it felt like the writers had done it before even though they had not. As a group, the writers tried to think of a new idea for the plot; they considered having Pam move in with Jim, but they thought that first the two should be engaged.

There was an auditioning process for both the chair model (Deborah Shoshlefski played by April Eden) and the young blond woman whom Michael sees in the coffee shop. According to Novak, the chair model was supposed to be "pretty" and "perhaps even prettier than your average model", but more of just an "average single girl", because the episode is more about Michael wanting to start dating again than the model herself. In the scene with the "Five Families", one of the actors, Paul Faust was the only first-time actor. Faust is the cousin of writer Paul Lieberstein, and had been on a tour of the set and talked to many of the writers. He made a good impression and so the character of "Cool Guy Paul" was based on him. The day before they were scheduled to shoot, the show still had not cast anyone for the role, so they called Paul in New York City and had him read the lines into a camera and e-mail to them. In less than an hour, Faust had landed the part and was flown out to Los Angeles.

Although Novak wrote the majority of the episode, Jennifer Celotta and Paul Lieberstein were actually the ones who came up with the graveyard scene in the end. The original song for Michael to sing was going to be a parody of "Candle in the Wind" by Elton John. Elton John however, refused to give The Office permission to use the song, because 30 Rock had requested permission for a parody of "Candle in the Wind" that offended Elton John, and he did not want to have his song parodied again. So then, the writers wrote parodies of "Legs" by ZZ Top and "Ruby Tuesday" by The Rolling Stones, but eventually "American Pie" by Don McLean cleared, so the writers went with it.

== Cultural references ==
Michael calls Oscar Martinez (Oscar Nunez) an "Oscar Mayer Wiener Lover", a reference to both the sausage of the same name, as well as Oscar's homosexuality. Andy and Kevin hold a meeting with the head of the "Five Families" of the office building, a reference to the New York City American Mafia "Five Families". Michael later tries to call a "hot and juicy redhead" named Wendy, but it turns out it was the number for Wendy's, the fast-food restaurant.

== Reception ==
"Chair Model" first aired on NBC on April 17, 2008. The episode received 5.8/9 percent share in the households demographic in the Nielsen ratings. This means that 5.8 percent of all households watched the episode, and nine percent had their televisions tuned to the channel at any point. The episode was watched by 9.86 million viewers total, as well as 6.49 million viewers in the 18–49 demographic.

"Chair Model" was generally well received by critics, although some fans were alienated by the darkness of the episode. Nathan Rabin of The A.V. Club gave the episode a moderately positive review and awarded it a "B+". He noted that the episode "fell on the wrong side of the funny/creepy divide for a lot of Office fans", but that he enjoyed the entry, calling the grave scene "unexpectedly sweet". He also enjoyed the maturation of Andy, describing him as "coming into his own [and becoming] something more than just a foil for Dwight". M. Giant of Television Without Pity awarded the episode an "A". BuddyTV senior writer Oscar Dahl wrote that "The Office is sharp as ever" and Jim's saying that he was going to propose was "a big time moment in the Jim/Pam story". Dahl also praised the parking lot storyline, saying "what started as merely a joke (Kevin was dumped), became a feel-good moment."

IGN's Travis Fickett said that Michael falling in love with the chair model was "a hysterical turn and highlights just how deluded Michael—and Dwight—can be". Fickett was critical of the "parking" storyline, saying that it was "a bit over the top and runs a bit thin", but he did think that the scene at the end with Kevin was "a sweet and genuine moment". Aubry D'Arminio of Entertainment Weekly stated that, in relation to the previous episode "Dinner Party", "Last night's show took another approach. Don't get me wrong. It was a blinder—but a totally different animal, so to speak." D'Arminio went on to praise the dual plots of the episode.
