= Leslie David Baker =

American actor (born 1958)

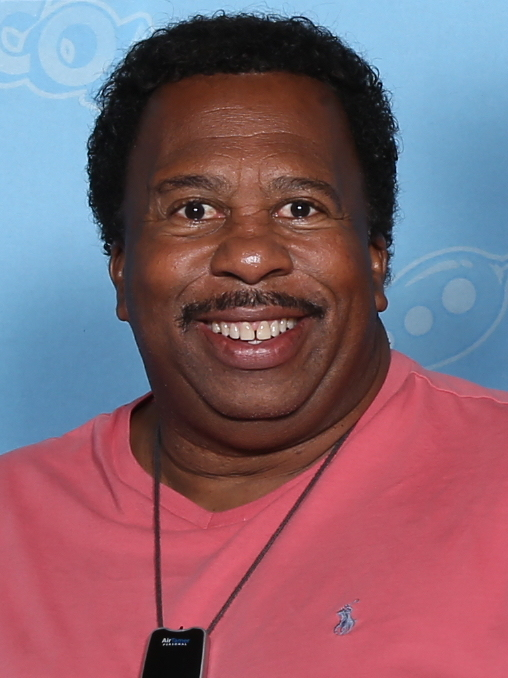
- Baker in 2019
- Born: February 19, 1958 (age 68); Chicago, Illinois, U.S.
- Education: Loyola University (BS); Spertus Institute (MS)
- Occupation: Actor
- Years active: 1998–present

Leslie David Baker (born February 19, 1958) is an American actor. He is best known for his role as Stanley Hudson on the NBC sitcom The Office (2005–2013), which earned him two Screen Actors Guild Awards.

Baker had recurring roles on the CMT sitcom Still the King (2016) and the Sky One comedy-drama series Living the Dream (2019). He had recurring voice roles on the Disney Junior series Puppy Dog Pals (2017–2022), the Apple TV+ series Doug Unplugs (2020–2022), and the HBO Max adult animated series Fired on Mars (2023). Baker had a starring role in the sports drama film Hard Miles (2023), and a supporting role in The Happytime Murders (2018). He had supporting voice roles in Captain Underpants: The First Epic Movie (2017) and Vivo (2021).

== Early life ==
Baker at Loyola University Chicago in 1978

Baker was born in Chicago, Illinois. He graduated from Mendel Catholic College Preparatory High School in Chicago, Illinois in 1976. He holds a B.S. in Psychology from Loyola University Chicago and an M.S. in human services administration from Spertus Institute for Jewish Learning and Leadership in Chicago. He taught special education and played an office worker in OfficeMax commercials while working on his MS degree. In Chicago, he worked for the Board of Education, the Department of Public Health, and the Office of Cable and Communications.

Baker moved to Los Angeles, California, in the late 1990s.

== Acting career ==
=== The Office ===
I still have the nine-to-five experience without the nine-to-five responsibilities. In the nine-to-five world, you don't have anybody who has your breakfast waiting for you in the morning, or lays out your wardrobe, or styles your hair.

— Baker on The Office

Baker had another audition scheduled on the day he was called back for The Office. On his way to his Office audition, he was caught in traffic, though producers thought he had been in the bathroom and thanked him for his patience. "By then I was kind of sweaty, my clothes were rumpled, and I was cranky," Baker later said. "The character was written the way I was feeling that day, and I just let 'er rip. Two weeks later I got a call: 'You got the pilot.'"

Baker's Office character, Stanley Hudson, is a sales representative for the fictional Dunder Mifflin paper distributor usually portrayed as a defiant, grouchy curmudgeon. It was said that his performance was "a standout" on the show, and with "his monotone voice and calm demeanor, he played well against the off-the-wall nature of many of the other characters." "Did I Stutter?" (season 4, 2008) has a focus on Baker's character; as with many supporting actors on The Office, some of Baker's scenes became memorable to fans. Stanley is rarely, but sometimes, given a "soft side"; in "Stairmageddon" (season 9, 2013), Baker plays a tranquilized, and then giddy, Stanley. At the conclusion of the series, Stanley says he is happy to be living in retirement in Florida.

He was part of the Office cast which won Screen Actors Guild Awards in the Outstanding Performance by an Ensemble in a Comedy Series category in 2007 and 2008.

In December 2017, after several former Office actors expressed interest in a revival of the series, The Hollywood Reporter's Lesley Goldberg said of Baker, "Why wouldn't he return?!" After The Office ended in 2013, The Hollywood Reporter said that Baker has had few roles; Bustle said that he was "plenty busy with his other creative pursuits". In July 2020, Baker launched a Kickstarter campaign to fund the production of a pilot for Uncle Stan, a proposed spin-off series of The Office focusing on Stanley as he moves to Los Angeles, California, to help his widowed nephew Lucky run his failing motorcycle repair/flower shop. The campaign raised $336,450 from 1,640 donors. In August 2023, he released a statement saying the money will be refunded as the project remained stalled indefinitely following COVID delays and the ongoing WGA and SAG-AFTRA strikes in Hollywood.

=== Other work ===
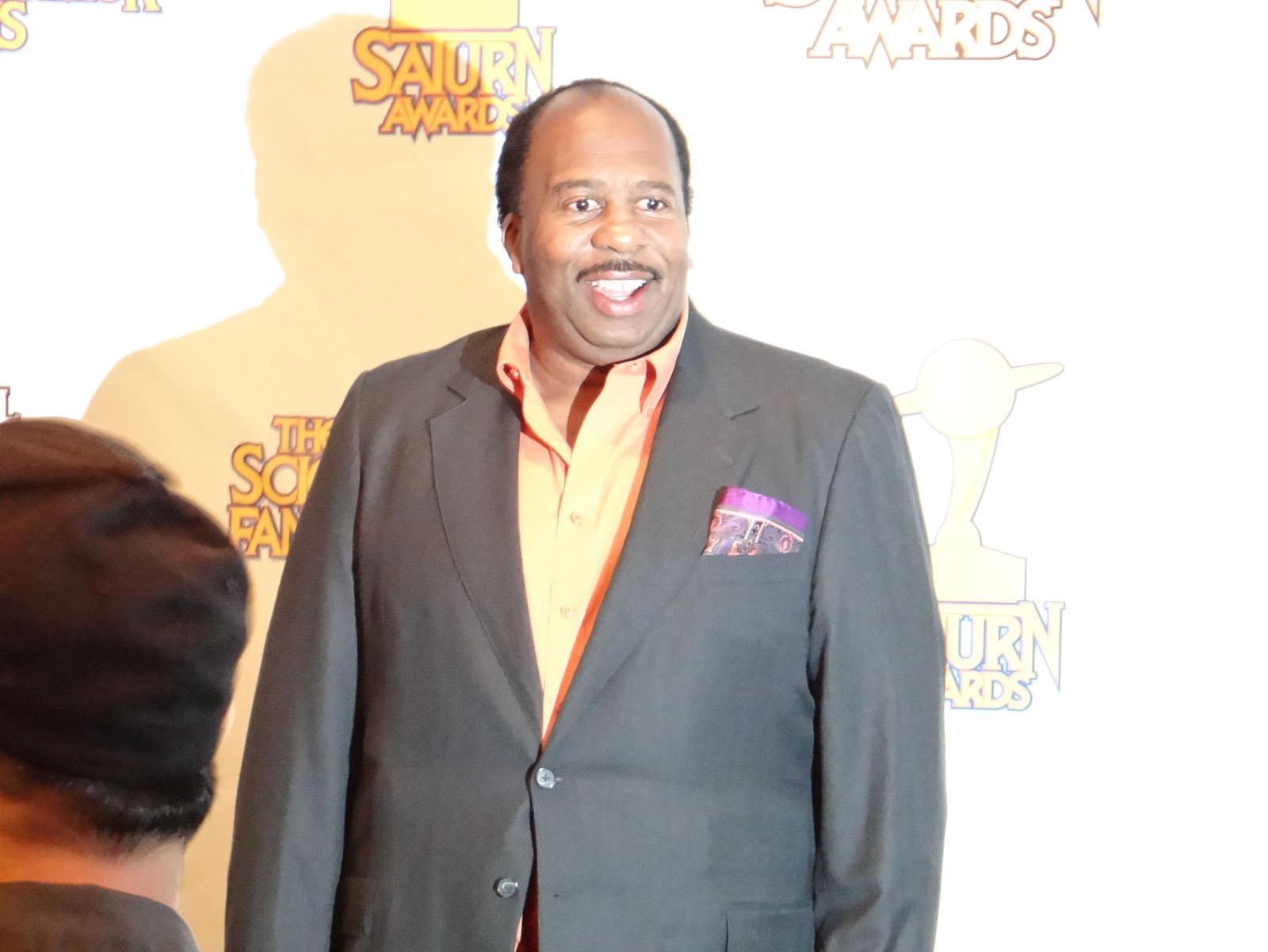
Baker at the 38th Saturn Awards in 2012

In 2001, Baker guest-starred in That '70s Show in season 3's "Backstage Pass" as a janitor at the Ted Nugent concert. In November 2011, Baker released the song "2 Be Simple" with an accompanying music video which features Baker (credited as "Black Hugh Hefner") in a bath robe dancing with scantily clad women. "For reasons that remain unclear," wrote Jan Chaney of The Washington Post, "Baker has released ... a track destined to be the party anthem at all your yuletide throwdowns." Cameron Matthews called the song's hook "infectious" with lyrics that "totally [capture] the daydreams of a middle-aged man in crisis."

Baker appeared in Raven's Home as Principal Wentworth; previously, he had small parts in Scorpion and Life in Pieces. He appeared on the CMT series Still the King and in the films Captain Underpants: The First Epic Movie (2017), in a voice role, and The Happytime Murders (2018). In another voice role, and workplace dark comedy, he appeared in Fired on Mars as Hubert Danielson.

He also appeared in a January 2018 advertisement for FileMaker Inc., a subsidiary of Apple Inc., as a farmer alongside former Office actors Paul Lieberstein and Kate Flannery. In 2020, Baker starred in a series of commercials for Honey Nut Cheerios.

== Filmography ==
=== Television ===
Year	Title	Role	Notes
1998	Maggie	Frank	Episode: "Cats"
1999	Action	Guard	Episode: "Love Sucks"
2000	Judging Amy	Uncle Vin Arlen	Episode: "Waterworld"
2000	Malcolm in the Middle	Cop	Episode: "Halloween Approximately"
2001	That '70s Show	Janitor	Episode: "Backstage Pass"
2001–2003	The Guardian	Teddy Desica	3 episodes
2002	Just Shoot Me!	Man	Episode: "The Burning House"
2003	Malcolm in the Middle	Customer	Episode: "Stereo Store"
2003	Scrubs	Surgery Patient	Episode: "My Interpretation"
2004	Line of Fire	Large Man	Episode: "The Best-Laid Plans"
2005–2013	The Office	Stanley Hudson	188 episodes
2006	The Office: The Accountants	Stanley Hudson	Webisode: "Stanley"
2008	Kevin's Loan	Stanley Hudson	Webisode: "Taste the Ice Cream"
2012	The Life & Times of Tim	Al Sharpton's College Roommate	Voice role; episode: "The Smug Chiropractor/Corporate Disaster"
2013	Key & Peele	Benjamin Button Man	Episode: “Meagan’s Fight”
2014	Marry Me	Jake's Boss	Episode: "Pilot"
2015	The Exes	Officer Wilson	Episode: "Requiem for a Dream"
2015	Austin & Ally	Mr. Schxlumbraugh	Episode: "Duos & Deception"
2016	Scorpion	Judge Tanniston	2 episodes
2016	Still the King	Curtis	9 episodes
2017	Life in Pieces	Gavin	Episode: "Chef Rescue Negotiator Necklace"
2017	Raven's Home	Principal Wentworth	2 episodes
2017	Ryan Hansen Solves Crimes on Television	Captain Jackson #4	Episode: "Trafficking and the Traffic King"
2017–2022	Puppy Dog Pals	Rufus / Frank	Voice role; 81 episodes
2019	Fam	Mr. Kersey	Episode: "It's Been A While"
2019	Living the Dream	Marvin Pepper	6 episodes
2020–2022	Doug Unplugs	Uncle Forknick	Voice role; 20 episodes
2021	Tom and Jerry in New York	Mr. Piper	Episode: "Telepathic Tabby/Shoe-in/It's a Gift/Stormin' the doorman"
2022	Roar	Johnny Spoons	Episode: "The Girl Who Loved Horses"
2023	Fired On Mars	Hubert Danielson	Voice role; 5 episodes

=== Film ===
Year	Title	Role	Notes
2001	Road to Redemption	Tow Truck Driver	
2005	Elizabethtown	Airport Security #2	Uncredited
2014	Wish I Was Here	Audition Actor #1	
2015	When Duty Calls	Clyde Pierce	Television film
2017	Fallen Stars	Ron	
2017	Captain Underpants: The First Epic Movie	Officer McPiggly	Voice role
2018	The Happytime Murders	Lt. Banning	
2021	Vivo	Florida bus driver	Voice role
2023	Hard Miles	Skip Bowman	
2024	The Lost Holliday	Dr. Blevins	
2024	Jackpot	Earl the Fameland Guard	

== Awards and nominations ==
Year	Award	Category	Nominated work	Result
2007	TV Guide Awards	Favorite Ensemble	The Office	Won
2007	Screen Actors Guild Awards	Outstanding Performance by an Ensemble in a Comedy Series	The Office	Won
2008	TV Land Awards	Future Classic Award	The Office	Won
2008	Screen Actors Guild Awards	Outstanding Performance by an Ensemble in a Comedy Series	The Office	Won
2009	Screen Actors Guild Awards	Outstanding Performance by an Ensemble in a Comedy Series	The Office	Nominated
2010	Screen Actors Guild Awards	Outstanding Performance by an Ensemble in a Comedy Series	The Office	Nominated
2011	Screen Actors Guild Awards	Outstanding Performance by an Ensemble in a Comedy Series	The Office	Nominated
2012	Screen Actors Guild Awards	Outstanding Performance by an Ensemble in a Comedy Series	The Office	Nominated
2013	Screen Actors Guild Awards	Outstanding Performance by an Ensemble in a Comedy Series	The Office	Nominated
