= Did I Stutter? =

- The Office episode
- Episode no.: Season 4 Episode 16
- Directed by: Randall Einhorn
- Written by: Brent Forrester; Justin Spitzer
- Cinematography by: Matthew K. Sohn
- Editing by: Dean Holland
- Production code: 416
- Original air date: May 1, 2008
- Running time: 22 minutes

Episode chronology
← Previous "Night Out"	Next → "Job Fair"
- The Office (American season 4)

"Did I Stutter?" is the sixteenth episode of the fourth season of the American comedy television series The Office and the show's sixty-ninth episode overall. Written by Brent Forrester and Justin Spitzer, and directed by Randall Einhorn, the episode first aired in the United States on May 1, 2008 on NBC.

In this episode, Michael Scott (Steve Carell) is shocked when Stanley Hudson (Leslie David Baker) yells at him, and is unsure how to handle the situation. Michael tries to assert his power over Stanley, by pretending to fire him, but that only makes matters worse. The two eventually end up alone in the office. Meanwhile, Jim Halpert (John Krasinski) receives a warning about his job performance, Pam Beesly (Jenna Fischer) is forced to wear her glasses, and Dwight Schrute (Rainn Wilson) buys Andy Bernard's (Ed Helms) car.

Originally, episode writers Justin Spitzer and Brent Forrester were supposed to write two separate episodes. However, the effects of the 2007–2008 Writers Guild of America strike forced the two to share an episode. "Did I Stutter?" contained several pop culture references. It received largely positive reviews from critics, who praised the interaction between Carell and Baker. The episode earned a Nielsen rating of 3.9 in the 18–49 demographic, being viewed by 7.76 million viewers.

== Plot ==
Michael Scott calls an emergency meeting asking everyone to come up with an idea to "reinvigorate" the office. Stanley Hudson is preoccupied with a crossword puzzle and refuses to participate. Michael keeps asking him, and Stanley snaps, "Did I stutter?!", after which Michael ends the meeting. Toby Flenderson encourages Michael to take disciplinary action against Stanley. Michael, initially resistant, pretends to fire him to teach him a lesson. When Michael tells Stanley that the firing was fake, Stanley goes on a rant, yelling and insulting Michael. Michael tells everyone but Stanley to leave the office, making everyone think he is about to berate Stanley. The camera crew sneak back in to film the exchange, where Michael tearfully asks Stanley why he picks on him. Stanley states that he does not respect him. Michael then takes a professional tone with Stanley, and says that, while he accepts that Stanley does not respect him, he cannot take such a disrespectful tone with him, because he is his boss. Stanley responds, "Fair enough," and the two shake hands.

Pam Beesly, after spending the night at a friend's house, forgot her contact lens solution, so she must wear her glasses. She finds it difficult to handle Michael's criticism and Kevin's sexual advances, and spends the rest of the day without her glasses, reducing her productivity. Ryan Howard comes to Dunder Mifflin's Scranton branch. After a talk with Toby, Ryan gives Jim Halpert an official warning about his job performance. Ryan denies that his action is motivated by Jim's previous complaints to David Wallace, saying he thrives on constructive criticism.

Andy Bernard is selling his 2001 Nissan Xterra for $8,700. Dwight Schrute pressures him into selling it for $1,500 less than the asking price, because according to Dwight, "[the] car is crap". Dwight assures Andy that he will only use it as a wagon, dragged by a mule on Dwight's beet farm. Andy sells it to Dwight, who, in a passive-aggressive method of getting back at him for dating Angela Martin, washes it and posts a sign asking for $9,995 for the vehicle, which upsets Andy when he finds Dwight's advertisement posted on the cabinet in the office kitchen. Dwight declares that it is already the subject of a three-way bidding war on eBay.

== Production ==
The episode was the fourth episode of the series directed by Randall Einhorn. Einhorn had previously directed the third season episodes "Initiation", "Ben Franklin" and "Product Recall", as well as the ten summer webisodes "The Accountants". It was Einhorn's idea to show the cameramen sneaking back into the office after Michael told everyone to leave. Brent Forrester, the co-writer of the episode, said that Einhorn's "energy doubled when shooting that" scene.

"Did I Stutter?" was written by Justin Spitzer and Brent Forrester. Although the two writers planned to write separate episodes, the 2007–2008 Writers Guild of America strike forced the two to share an episode. Forrester and Spitzer disagreed about what the episode's title should be. Forrester wanted to name it "Did I Stutter?" (a phrase popularized by the 1985 film The Breakfast Club)—while Spitzer wanted a name like "The Reprimand" or "Insubordination". Gene Stupnitsky and Lee Eisenberg wrote the scene featuring Andy and Angela playing Mad Libs. Justin Spitzer called the sequence "amazing" because it gave a glimpse of the sort of activities Andy and Angela do in their free time, something the pseudo-documentary format of The Office ordinarily did not permit.

The crew noted that Leslie David Baker, who played Stanley, seemed extraordinarily well-prepared for the filming. Baker explained, "After four years [of being on The Office], when you've been getting little bits and bits and bits, and you finally get a good, meaty role, you have to go for it."

In the opening scene in which Michael puts his face in cement, the wet cement that was used was actually putty. The crew was planning to do only one take of Steve Carell putting his face in the putty, so he was instructed to hold his breath as long as he possibly could. But the crew forgot to tell the other actors about that, so during the filming of the scene, the actors thought he was actually stuck and there was a rush to pull him out. Despite this, and despite Carell ad-libbing a "That's what she said" during filming, none of the cast broke character and so no additional takes were done. Kim M. Ferry, owner of the Nissan Xterra featured in the episode, is the show's Department Head Hairstylist. After it was used on the show, she decided to sell it on eBay. The listing was first put up on eBay on May 1, 2008, the night the episode aired.

In order to maximize the realism of Pam wearing glasses, creator/producer Greg Daniels wanted actress Jenna Fischer, who in real life had unimpaired vision, to be fitted for contact lenses which would distort her vision and wear glasses crafted to correct the distortion. However, Fischer refused, telling Daniels that the reason she was in comedy was because she did not want to go to such lengths for a role, and she instead wore fake glasses.

A number of viewers interpreted the episode as implying that Toby was at least partially responsible for Jim getting a warning about his job performance. Spitzer and Forrest have said this was not their intent; they simply thought it would be natural for Toby, as human resources representative, to be present when an employee was receiving a formal warning, and the fact that Toby is happy about Jim getting the warning was not meant to imply that he had anything to do with it.

The Season Four DVDs contain a number of deleted scenes from this episode, including Michael trying to convince Jim, Pam, and Kelly that Stanley talks badly about them behind their backs, Michael making Pam stand up during the meeting and confess that she wears glasses, Jim talking to Toby about the warning (in contrast to how Jim focuses his ire on Ryan during the broadcast episode, here he seems to blame Toby, who defends himself by emphasizing Dwight and Ryan's criticisms of Jim), and Ryan saying that "going after Jim" is risky, since CFO David Wallace likes Jim. Deleted scenes not contained on the DVDs include Andy acting out the man eating cat food and a talking head interview with Kevin saying "I'd still do Pam, but it would take longer."

== Cultural references ==
Andy and Angela play Mad Libs, a phrasal template word game where one player prompts another for a list of words to substitute for blanks in a story, usually with funny results. Ryan chides Jim for being a fan of the Philadelphia Eagles, a professional American football team. While Daryl is telling Michael how gang members deal with problems, he mentions that he was a member of the Newsies (the name of a 1992 musical drama) and The Warriors (the gang in the 1979 cult action film of the same name). Near the end of the episode, Michael does a succession of comedian impressions. These include badly performed spoofs of Rodney Dangerfield, Henny Youngman, Jeff Foxworthy, Sacha Baron Cohen as Borat Sagdiyev, and Jerry Seinfeld.

== Reception ==
"Did I Stutter?" originally aired on NBC in the United States on May 1, 2008. The episode received 3.9/10 in the ages 18–49 demographic in the Nielsen ratings. This means that 3.9 percent of all households with an 18- to 49-year-old living in it watched the episode, and ten percent had their televisions tuned to the channel at any point. The episode was watched by 7.67 million viewers.

The episode was highly acclaimed by critics, with many praising the performance from Leslie David Baker. Nathan Rabin of The A.V. Club gave the episode an "A", citing the dynamic between Michael and Stanley as its main strengths. He was also complimentary towards the cold opening and the realistic way in which Michael and Stanley's confrontation was filmed. Ultimately, Rabin concluded that the interaction between Carell and Baker was reason to "love the Stanley/Michael dynamic" and that the episode "was all about rage and conflict". M. Giant of Television Without Pity awarded the episode an "A−".

Rick Porter of Zap2It said that even though the episode "was long on uncomfortable and even disturbing behavior" and "only out-and-out funny in a few spots" he found himself "respecting it a fair amount at the end". BuddyTV Senior Writer Oscar Dahl said that "the insubordination of Stanley was a necessary plot point to cover" because "without it, too much Stanley being Stanley becomes unbelievable". Furthermore, he wrote that there "was a lot of really funny stuff tonight" and highlighted the scene between Darryl and Michael due to Robinson's acting. Aubry D'Arminio from Entertainment Weekly stated that "Mike's embarrassment, and his unwillingness at first to admit he is disliked, was very very well played on Carell's part." Furthermore, D'Arminio praised several of the episode's lines of dialogue and wrote "I cannot even come near to picking a favorite quote [...] for this episode."
