= Dinner Party (The Office) =

- The Office episode
- Episode no.: Season 4 Episode 13
- Directed by: Paul Feig
- Written by: Lee Eisenberg; Gene Stupnitsky
- Cinematography by: Randall Einhorn
- Editing by: David Rogers
- Production code: 413
- Original air date: April 10, 2008
- Running time: 22 minutes

Guest appearances
- Beth Grant as Melvina Whitaker; Steve Seagren; Gary Weeks

Episode chronology
← Previous "The Deposition"	Next → "Chair Model"
- The Office (American season 4)

"Dinner Party" is the thirteenth episode of the fourth season of the American comedy television series The Office and the show's sixty-sixth episode overall. Written by the writing team of Lee Eisenberg and Gene Stupnitsky and directed by Paul Feig, the episode originally aired on NBC on April 10, 2008. In the episode, Michael Scott (Steve Carell) and his girlfriend Jan Levinson (Melora Hardin), the former Vice-President of Regional Sales at the Dunder Mifflin corporate office in New York City, throw a dinner party and invite Jim Halpert (John Krasinski) and Pam Beesly (Jenna Fischer), and Andy Bernard (Ed Helms) and Angela Martin (Angela Kinsey). Guest stars in the episode include Beth Grant, Steve Seagren, and Gary Weeks.

The episode was the first original episode of The Office to be broadcast since the episode "The Deposition" on November 15, 2007, due to the effects of the 2007–08 Writers Guild of America strike. The atmosphere on the set was one of a more laid-back nature, and the cast broke into laughter due to the jokes many times. "Dinner Party" received acclaim from critics, with many hailing it as one of the series' best entries. The episode received 4.8 Nielsen rating and was watched by 9.2 million viewers.

== Plot ==
The office workers are stuck working overtime on a major assignment. After asking Jim Halpert to confirm that he has not made any plans for the evening in anticipation of the overtime assignment, Michael Scott calls corporate and declares that he is releasing the workers from overtime. Michael then proceeds to invite Jim and his girlfriend Pam Beesly to join him and his girlfriend Jan Levinson for dinner at his condominium after Jim had previously turned him down nine times. When Jim begins to formulate an excuse, Michael reminds him that he just said he had not made any plans. Jim begins to suspect that Michael fabricated the overtime assignment and the call to corporate just to maneuver him and Pam into coming to dinner. Michael also invites Andy Bernard and Angela Martin, but excludes Dwight Schrute due to it being a couples' dinner and Michael owning only six wine glasses, much to Dwight's dismay.

On a tour of the condominium, Jan shows the workspace from which she runs her candle-making home business. Jan's dominance in the relationship is apparent from the living arrangements; Michael sleeps on a small bench due to Jan's "space issues", and his sole comfort is a very small "plasma TV", which he bought for $200. It is also later revealed that Michael underwent three vasectomies in the course of trying to please Jan’s inconsistent decisions about having children. Throughout the evening, Jan plays a song by her former assistant, Hunter. Titled "That One Night", the lyrics of the song strongly suggest an intimate encounter once occurred between Jan and Hunter. The guests are made increasingly uncomfortable at Michael and Jan's veiled sniping at each other.

In the kitchen, Jan quietly confronts Pam with a false assumption that Michael and Pam once dated, while Michael attempts to get Jim and Andy to invest in Jan's candle-making business for "only $10,000". Jim's attempt to escape the party with Pam by pretending his apartment has flooded is unsuccessful. Dwight arrives, uninvited, with his own food, wine glasses and his former babysitter as his date (Dwight describes the relationship as "purely carnal"). The feud between Michael and Jan escalates, culminating in Jan's destruction of the $200 television using one of Michael's beloved Dundie Awards. The police arrive, responding to a call about a disturbance; despite Jan becoming remorseful, Michael agrees to spend the night with Dwight under the advice of the officers. Jim and Pam eat take-out food in their car, repeatedly calling each other "babe" in a mockery of Michael and Jan; Jim also puts on Hunter's CD, which he stole from the condo. In Andy's car, Andy attempts to flirt with Angela by leaning in and tasting her ice cream cone; she responds coldly by smashing the ice cream on the outside of the door. Jan tries to fix the broken Dundie Award, to no avail.

== Production ==
=== Background ===
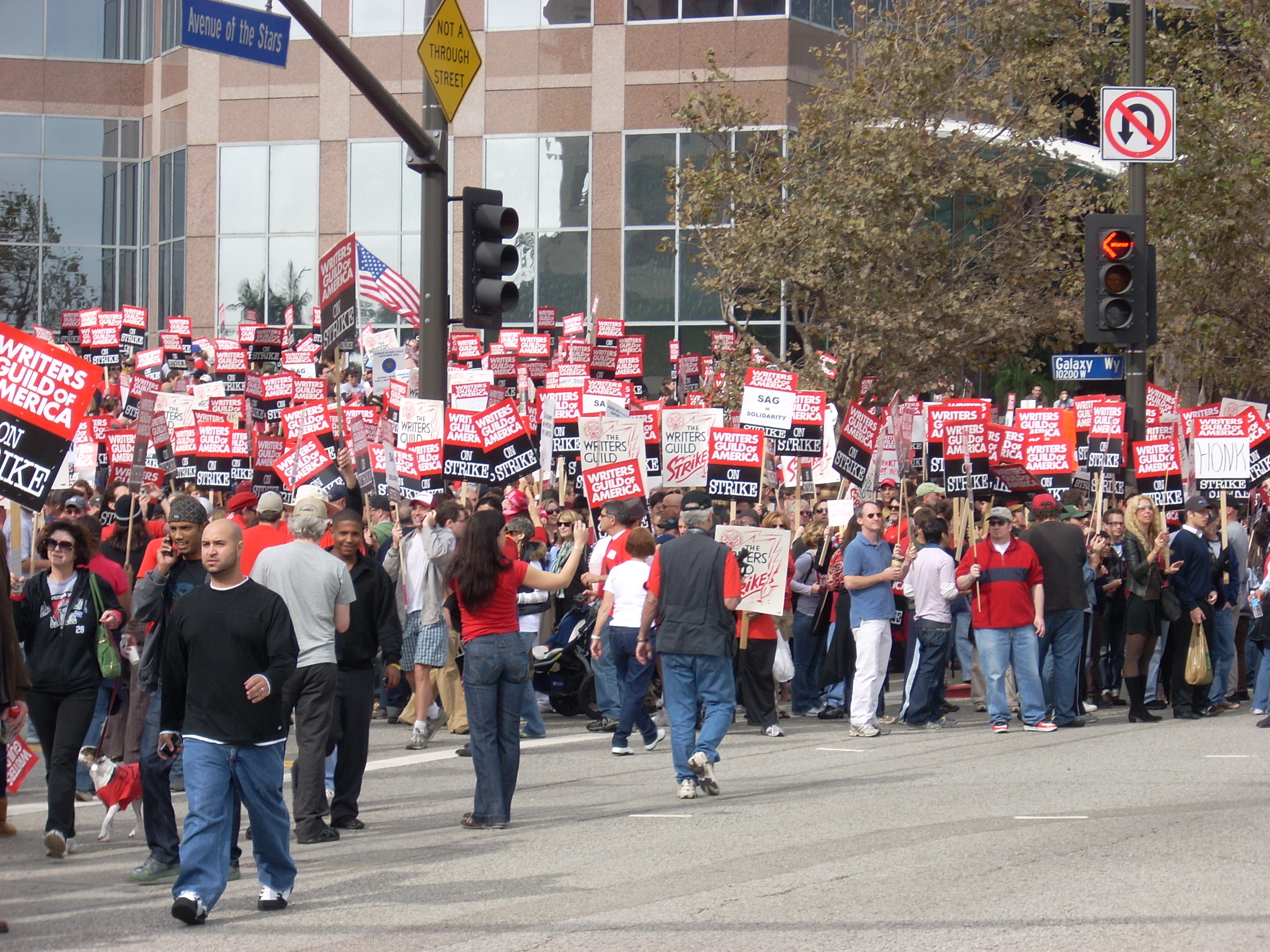
The Writers Guild of America was on strike for 100 days causing production of The Office to go on hiatus for four months.

The episode was the first original episode of The Office to be broadcast since the episode "The Deposition" on November 15, 2007, due to the effects of the 2007–08 Writers Guild of America strike. The Writers Guild of America (WGA) went on strike at 12:01 am Eastern Standard Time on November 5, 2007. Filming of The Office immediately halted on that date, as Steve Carell, who is a member of the WGA, refused to cross WGA picket lines. Members of Writers Guild of America, East and Writers Guild of America, West voted to end the 100-day strike on February 12, 2008. Writers were allowed to return to work on the same day. The WGA allowed for show runners to return to work on February 11, in preparation for the conclusion of the strike. The show runner for The Office, executive producer Greg Daniels, returned on February 11, while the show's writers returned to work on February 13. If not for the writers' strike, this episode would have completed filming during the week of November 5, 2007.

=== Writing and directing ===
"Dinner Party" was written by Lee Eisenberg and Gene Stupnitsky. Other writers for the series also added various background gags to the episode, such as Andy wearing two sweaters and holding a coat, all of the photos in the condo being of Jan with other men, and Michael's garage having both a Soloflex and a Bowflex back to back because "Michael is completely taken by late-night infomercials".

The episode was directed by Paul Feig, making it his sixth directorial credit for the series. Eisenberg and Stupnitsky later noted that, because the episode was the first to be filmed following the strike, there was "a great, loose vibe on set", and as such, many of the actors would break character and laugh at the jokes. The majority of the episode took place at Michael's condo. This was the same location used in the second season entry "Office Olympics". Eisenberg and Stupnitsky explained that "the production design team did an amazing job to transform the condo from Michael's design aesthetic to Jan's."

As usual for the series, the scenes and dialogue hewed closely to the script, with minimal improvisation by the actors. However, Jan actress Melora Hardin refrained from trying to get Jim to dance with her during rehearsals because she wanted Jim actor John Krasinski to be caught off-guard and have to react to it on camera.

The song featured in the episode supposedly performed by Jan's former assistant, Hunter, was written by the episode writers Lee Eisenberg and Gene Stupnitsky and Todd Fancey of The New Pornographers; Eisenberg and Stupnitsky wrote the lyrics, and Fancey wrote the music. The song was sung by Fancey. Eisenberg and Stupnitsky later explained that, despite the suggestive lyrics, the song is "left to interpretation". The lyrics were sent to a number of musicians and bands, asking them to write and record music for the song, and after listening to the various submissions Eisenberg and Stupnitsky chose Fancey's version. In April 2018, Fancey shared an alternate version of "That One Night". After sending an acoustic version, Fancey was asked by a production assistant to record a "smoother, more polished" version of the song. The fully arranged version was later scrapped in favor of Fancey's original version.

The episode guest starred Beth Grant, Steve Seagren, and Gary Weeks. Grant would later reprise her character in the ninth season episode "Junior Salesman". Grant was asked to appear in the episode after Daniels saw her performance in the 2007 film No Country for Old Men. Grant praised Carell's improvisational skills—noting that "he just keeps going off script [and that he] is channeling something"—as well as Wilson's humorous antics while acting. She concluded that "if they had wanted a crazy, wild feature film using all the comedy that I saw in just those few days, you could absolutely have had one" with their acting.

== Cultural references ==
The group plays Celebrity, a game wherein teams play against each other to guess as many celebrity names as possible before time runs out. Michael tries to get his team to guess Arnold Schwarzenegger by saying, "Rhymes with Parnold Schwarzenegger". Michael also tries to get his team to guess Tom Cruise, to which Jim answers Katie Holmes and Dawson's Creek to purposely throw Michael off. Thematically, several crew members and critics have compared the episode to the 1962 play Who's Afraid of Virginia Woolf? by Edward Albee, which examines the breakdown of the marriage of a middle-aged couple.

== Reception ==
=== Ratings ===
"Dinner Party" brought in an average of 9.2 million American viewers, which was the highest total audience since the fourth season premiere episode "Fun Run". This episode achieved a 4.8/12 percent rating in the key 18–49 demographic, meaning that 4.8 percent of 18- to 49-year-olds were tuned in at any given moment and twelve percent of all 18- to 49-year-olds watching television at the time were tuned in. The episode ranked in eighth place, in the 18–49 demographic, among all programs on television, which aired during the week of this episodes original broadcast.

=== Reviews ===
The episode has been met with critical acclaim since it has aired and is considered one of the best episodes of The Office by many critics. Travis Fickett of IGN wrote that "this is one of those great episodes of The Office that is hysterical and difficult to watch at the same time." He noted that this was largely due to the fact that "it's not because of something Michael is doing that makes you wince. It's because of what's happening to him." He ultimately gave the episode an 8.9/10, denoting a "great" episode. Jay Black of AOL's TV Squad said that "[he] was happy The Office was back" but "the only thing [he] worried about was whether it'd still be good" after the writers strike. However, he noted that his fears were put to rest and that "Dinner Party" was "a Barry Bonds's-style chemically enhanced mega-home-run." M. Giant of Television Without Pity graded this episode with an "A." Aubry D'Arminio of Entertainment Weekly said that her favorite moment of the episode "was when Jan popped on that song by her former assistant, Hunter."

Jack Rodgers of TV Guide wrote that it is "a hilarious, brutally awkward look at the relationship (and apartment) from hell, a train wreck that you just can’t keep from staring at." He also noted that it is "a study of four couples: one hideously dysfunctional (Michael and Jan), one loving (Jim and Pam), one mismatched (Angela and Andy), and one, ahem, "purely carnal" (Dwight and babysitter)." The A.V. Club reviewer Nathan Rabin praised the episode for its "sheer squirm-inducing awkwardness". He ultimately gave the episode an "A". Former United States Republican presidential nominee John McCain, a fan of the series, told writer B. J. Novak that his favorite scene from the show is in this episode when Michael is giving his guests a tour of his condo, and a tripod can be seen set up by his bed.

=== Awards ===
Lee Eisenberg and Gene Stupnitsky's writing for this episode was nominated for the Primetime Emmy Award for Outstanding Writing for a Comedy Series at the 60th Primetime Emmy Awards in 2008. Paul Feig won the 2008 Directors Guild of America award for Outstanding Directing in a Comedy Series for this episode.
