= Job Fair (The Office) =

- The Office episode
- Episode no.: Season 4 Episode 17
- Directed by: Tucker Gates
- Written by: Lee Eisenberg; Gene Stupnitsky
- Cinematography by: Randall Einhorn
- Editing by: David Rogers
- Production code: 417
- Original air date: May 8, 2008

Guest appearances
- Phil Reeves as Phil Maguire; Trevor Einhorn as Justin Polznik

Episode chronology
← Previous "Did I Stutter?"	Next → "Goodbye, Toby"
- The Office (American season 4)

"Job Fair" is the seventeenth episode of the fourth season of the American comedy television series The Office and the show's seventieth episode overall. Written by Lee Eisenberg and Gene Stupnitsky and directed by Tucker Gates, the episode first aired in the United States on May 8, 2008 on NBC.

In the episode, Michael and a few employees go to a high school's job fair to find a summer intern for Dunder Mifflin, Jim attempts to make an important sale by golfing with a potential client, and Dwight is left in charge of the office.

== Plot ==
After Ryan Howard gives Jim Halpert a warning about his job performance, Jim tries to land his biggest client ever. He takes the potential client golfing, bringing along co-workers Andy Bernard and Kevin Malone. When Jim tries to talk business, the client reveals that he is not interested in switching paper suppliers. But after much persistence and negotiation, Jim lands the account.

Michael Scott, Pam Beesly, Oscar Martinez and Darryl Philbin set up a booth at a local job fair to find a student for Dunder Mifflin’s summer internship but while other companies are prepared and have provided materials and products for their booth, Michael only brought a single white piece of Dunder-Mifflin paper. The fair proves unsuccessful, as Michael drives away the only interested student, Justin because he deems Justin not cool enough for him. After everyone else either ignores the booth or tells Michael off, Michael tries to recruit Justin as their intern, only for Justin to call Michael out for treating him badly and walk away. Michael then makes such a commotion that the teacher calls security and has him removed from the fair. After, Pam ventures to a booth advertising graphic design, where she discovers that she has yet to learn many graphic design programs. The man working at the booth recommends she goes to either Philadelphia or New York City to learn about the graphic design technology.

Meanwhile, Michael has left Dwight Schrute in charge of the office, but none of the employees obey his wishes. When most of the employees leave in the middle of the day, Dwight is left alone except for ex-girlfriend Angela Martin, causing the two to interact awkwardly for the rest of the day. When Jim and Pam meet up again in the office, they share two long, passionate kisses having accomplished both of their goals (Jim making the sale and Pam finding out the next step for her future in graphic design).

== Production ==
This episode was the third episode of the series directed by Tucker Gates. Gates had previously directed the third season episodes "Branch Closing" and "Women's Appreciation". "Job Fair" was written by Gene Stupnitsky and Lee Eisenberg.

In order to create the blisters that Andy had on his hands during the episode, the make-up crew had to use Ben Nye sunburn colors, RCMA scar making material, and acetone. The process took twenty to thirty minutes, in which the sunburn colors were applied first and the scar making material was applied last. Angela Kinsey was pregnant during shooting. Her character wasn't pregnant, so items (such as a copy machine) were placed between her stomach and the camera to hide her pregnancy. Writer Lee Eisenberg recalled that during editing "I asked if we had any wider shots. Both Gene (Stupnitsky) and Dave Rogers (the editor) reminded me that we were shooting around Angela's enormous belly". Kinsey gave birth on May 3, five days before the episode premiered.

== Reception ==
"Job Fair" received 3.6/9 in the ages 18–49 demographic in the Nielsen ratings. This means that 3.6 percent of all households with an 18- to 49-year-old living in it watched the episode, and nine percent had their televisions tuned to the channel at any point. The episode was watched by 7.22 million viewers.

Reviews for this episode were mixed. Travis Fickett of IGN criticized parts of the episode, saying that the situation between Dwight and Angela was "played out so minimalist that virtually nothing develops" and even though Michael "gets up and makes an ass of himself" the resolution "isn't much of a pay-off". Fickett did say that although "this may not be the funniest episode, it shows how the series is capable of subtlety and depth." BuddyTV's Oscar Dahl thought that "Job Fair" "had some nice moments, but it was a bit lacking in the comedy department". Jay Black, from TV Squad, wrote that Andy "stole the show".
