= The Deposition (The Office) =

- The Office episode
- Dwight and Mose playing ping-pong
- Episode no.: Season 4 Episode 12
- Directed by: Julian Farino
- Written by: Lester Lewis
- Cinematography by: Randall Einhorn
- Editing by: Dean Holland
- Production code: 412
- Original air date: November 15, 2007

Guest appearances
- Andy Buckley as David Wallace; Holly Maples as Diane Kelly; Patrick O'Connor as Lester Snyder

Episode chronology
← Previous "Survivor Man"	Next → "Dinner Party"
- The Office (American season 4)

"The Deposition" is the twelfth episode of the fourth season of the American comedy television series The Office and the show's sixty-fifth episode overall. Written by consulting producer Lester Lewis and directed by Julian Farino, the episode originally aired in the United States on November 15, 2007, on NBC. "The Deposition" was the last original episode of the show to air before the show went on hiatus due to the 2007 Writers Guild of America strike.

Jan Levinson (Melora Hardin) and Michael Scott (Steve Carell) travel to New York City for the deposition of Jan's lawsuit against the company. Meanwhile, Kelly Kapoor (Mindy Kaling) talks smack to Pam Beesly (Jenna Fischer) after Darryl Philbin (Craig Robinson) beats Jim Halpert (John Krasinski) in a game of ping pong, prompting Jim to spend the entire day practicing in the conference room.

== Plot ==
After his girlfriend Jan Levinson sues her former employer Dunder Mifflin for wrongful termination, she calls on Michael Scott to be a witness against his employer. Ryan Howard wants to make sure Michael will not say anything to harm Dunder Mifflin even though Michael is Jan's boyfriend. Toby Flenderson comes along as the HR representative, against Michael's protests. The deposition goes well for Jan at first, as she claims that she was terminated due to discrimination over her breast augmentation. To counter evidence that she had a romantic relationship with Michael before they disclosed it to corporate, Jan submits Michael's personal diary, which she brought to the deposition without his knowledge or permission. Michael gets further incensed against Jan when he learns that she gave him a scathing performance review after they had begun dating, recommending he be demoted to sales. Michael learns he was never a contender when interviewing for Jan's former position at the corporate office, with the CFO saying that he is a nice guy, but unsuited for the position. Michael defends the company anyway, later stating that "you expect to get screwed by your company, but you never expect to get screwed by your girlfriend." Jan and Michael drive home, angry at each other over the events of the day.

Back at the Scranton, Pennsylvania branch of Dunder Mifflin, Jim Halpert repeatedly loses to warehouse foreman Darryl Philbin at ping pong, prompting Darryl's girlfriend Kelly Kapoor to gloat to Jim's girlfriend Pam Beesly over her boyfriend's superior skills. Unable to tolerate Kelly's trash-talk, Pam builds a makeshift ping pong table in the conference room for Jim to practice against other office employees. Throughout the day, Jim practices against his coworkers, eventually discovering Dwight Schrute's prowess at the game. When Jim and Darryl have a rematch, Jim again loses to Darryl. Fed up with Kelly's continued taunting, Pam challenges her to a game of ping pong, but the two play poorly. Jim and Darryl quickly get bored of watching them and decide to play ping pong in the conference room. Dwight plays a high-intensity game of ping pong against his cousin Mose Schrute, with the two at an apparent stalemate.

== Production ==
"The Deposition" was the first episode of The Office to be written by Lester Lewis. Lewis also worked for the show as a consulting producer. The episode was the second of the show to be directed by Julian Farino. Farino also directed the third season episode "Back from Vacation".

"The Deposition" was the last original episode of The Office to air in 2007 due to the effects of the 2007–2008 Writers Guild of America strike. The Writers Guild of America (WGA) went on strike at 12:01 am Eastern Standard Time on November 5, 2007. Filming of The Office immediately halted on that date, as Steve Carell, who is a member of the WGA, refused to cross WGA picket lines. Members of Writers Guild of America, East and Writers Guild of America, West voted to end the 100-day strike on February 12, 2008. Writers were allowed to return to work on the same day. The WGA allowed for show runners to return to work on February 11, in preparation for the conclusion of the strike. The show runner for The Office, executive producer Greg Daniels, returned on February 11, while the show's writers returned to work on February 13. The Office finally returned with original episodes on April 10, 2008, with the episode "Dinner Party".

Daniels stated that one of the main purposes of "The Deposition" was to add on to the tension building between Michael and Jan, which leads into the episode "Dinner Party". The scene where Michael has lunch with Toby was filmed in the commissary at Universal Studios and was scripted to end with Michael giving a lengthy speech about how awful Toby is. The crew was doing one last take of the scene and actor Paul Lieberstein suggested that Steve Carell instead just push his food off the table and walk away.

Though only a few pages of Michael's journal are ever visible in the episode, the prop crew took the time to fill almost every page of the book with entries written in Michael Scott's voice.

The ping pong game between Dwight and Mose featured computer-generated imagery. Rainn Wilson and Michael Schur mimed the actions of a ping pong game, and during the stages of editing and post-production, the ping pong ball was added digitally. However, all the other ping pong matches in the episode (Jim versus Darryl, Jim versus Dwight, Pam versus Kelly, and in scenes that were cut before broadcast, Phyllis versus Stanley, Jim versus Creed, and Jim versus Andy) were done without any visual effects. Since the matches were all tightly scripted and most of them had to be timed with action from characters who were not playing, filming these scenes took an inordinately large number of takes, and many of the crew unsuccessfully argued in favor of using computer-generated imagery for these matches as well.

== Reception ==
"The Deposition" received a 5.1 Nielsen rating and an 8% share. The episode was watched by 8.86 million viewers and achieved a 4.8/11 in the key adults 18 to 49 demographic, meaning that 4.8 percent of all people 18 to 49 watched the episode, and 11 percent of all people 18 to 49 watching television at the time watched the episode.

Rick Porter of Zap2It.com praised the writing of the episode, as well as the acting of Mindy Kaling and Jenna Fischer. Porter also praised the final scene of the episode, when Jan and Michael drive home after the day. Porter stated "I don't know whether to laugh or turn away in shame from that final scene, though, as they bicker about what to eat while they're driving home. It was like watching two friends fight – fascinating and incredibly uncomfortable at the same time." Christine Fenno of Entertainment Weekly stated "'The Deposition' was a simmering slow cooker of corporate intrigue, flavored by Michael Scott's ridiculousness, with spicy smack talk on the side." Fenno, like Porter, also praised the acting of Jenna Fischer, saying that she "stole the low-key opening scenes". Travis Fickett of IGN stated that "this happens to be the best episode of the season and one of the best episodes of the series. It's almost as if the writers planned it this way – to emphasize their importance and remind us how much we'll miss them when they're gone." Fickett went on to praise the acting between Steve Carell (Michael) and Paul Lieberstein (Toby). BuddyTV senior writer Oscar Dahl stated that the episode was an oddity among the series, saying "The Deposition" was an atypical episode of The Office, one that basically put the character of Michael Scott on trial and humiliated him over and over again."
