= Vivi Zigler =

American television executive

Vivi Zigler is an American television executive, and a President of Shine America.

== Education and early career ==
Zigler attended California Polytechnic State University (San Luis Obispo, California) where she received her Bachelor of Science degree in journalism. From there, Zigler began working at the local NBC affiliate television station, KSBY-TV. Zigler began in the newsroom at the station before being promoted to management.

== NBC career ==
In the early 1990s, Zigler relocated to Seattle, WA where she worked at another NBC affiliate television station, KING-TV. After spending several years in Seattle at KING-TV, Zigler relocated to Burbank, CA to work for NBC at their west-coast headquarters.

=== 2003 ===
In March 2003, Zigler was named senior vice president of marketing & advertising services for The NBC Agency—and also oversaw Marketing and Advertising for Bravo. Her role was later expanded to include heading all marketing for the Bravo cable network as a member of the new Bravo senior management team. While in the position, Zigler was in charge of overall branding and marketing for Bravo, including the successful campaigns for Queer Eye for the Straight Guy and Celebrity Poker. The end result saw Bravo attain unparalleled ratings peaks during her term.

=== 2005 ===
In June, 2005 Zigler was promoted to executive vice president, Current Programs, NBC Entertainment, where she oversaw the production of NBC's slate of comedy and drama series. Her much-lauded previous experience in marketing allowed Zigler an extra dimension to increase NBC's promotional, casting and story opportunities in the Current Programs department.

=== 2006 ===
"Zigler was appointed executive vice president, NBC Digital Entertainment & New Media, NBC Entertainment, in August 2006. In this role she reports to Jeff Gaspin, president of NBC Universal Cable and Digital Content. Zigler is responsible for leading the NBC.com digital team in strategic efforts to further connect NBC’s primetime, late-night and daytime programs to Internet users, while also reaching across the company to keep communication and coordination at its best."

=== 2008 ===
On June 30, 2008, NBC Universal named Zigler President, NBC Universal Digital Entertainment.

=== 2012 ===
On June 6, 2012, NBC Universal announced Robert Hayes as executive vice president for digital media, with responsibilities encompassing NBC.com, social media campaigns, mobile applications, digital marketing and multi-platform programming. Vivi Zigler, who has been in charge of NBC's digital presence for six years, left the network at the end of June.

== Shine America ==
On August 28, 2012 Zigler was named president, Digital & Shine 360, Shine America. In this role, Zigler is responsible for overseeing all branded entertainment, licensing, digital and live experiences for Shine America which produces and distributes scripted and unscripted television content including The Office, The Biggest Loser, MasterChef, The Tudors and Ugly Betty.
