= Local Ad =

- The Office episode
- The Dunder Mifflin graphic created by Pam for the "Local Ad"
- Episode no.: Season 4 Episode 9
- Directed by: Jason Reitman
- Written by: B. J. Novak
- Cinematography by: Randall Einhorn
- Editing by: David Rogers
- Production code: 409
- Original air date: October 25, 2007

Guest appearances
- Kyle Bornheimer as Adman; Andy Buckley as David Wallace; Tim Kang as Koh

Episode chronology
← Previous "Money"	Next → "Branch Wars"
- The Office (American season 4)

"Local Ad" is the ninth episode of the fourth season of the American comedy television series The Office and the show's sixty-second episode overall. The episode was written by B. J. Novak, who also acts in the show as Ryan Howard, and directed by Jason Reitman. It originally aired in the United States on October 25, 2007, on NBC.

After a video team is brought to the office to create a commercial for the company, Michael decides that the employees of the Scranton branch of Dunder Mifflin can create a better commercial. While the majority of the staff work on the commercial, Dwight, still depressed from his break-up with Angela, instead chooses to play a computer game.

== Plot ==
When Michael Scott learns that the Scranton branch's participation in a Dunder Mifflin television commercial is limited to five seconds of the staff waving at the camera, he dismisses the advertising consultants sent to the branch, and convinces the company's corporate headquarters to consider an alternative version that he will produce himself.

Michael asks Pam Beesly to design an animated logo, and she works all night on it. Phyllis Vance's mission to enlist visiting author Sue Grafton to appear in the ad is unsuccessful. Headed by Darryl Philbin, a group of employees write and perform a jingle for the commercial, which Michael ultimately rejects. Andy Bernard, meanwhile, struggles throughout the day to recall the product name from an advertising jingle that contains the lyrics "Gimme a break. Gimme a break. Break me off a piece of that..."

Dwight Schrute, playing in the online virtual world of Second Life, has created an avatar named Dwight Shelford, also a paper salesman, patterned after his once-perfect real life. He now uses Second Life as an escape from his real-life troubles, even creating a virtual Second Life, called Second Second Life. Jim Halpert creates his own avatar named Jim Samtanko, a guitar-playing Philadelphia sportswriter, and enters Second Life in order to spy on Dwight.

Dwight reluctantly becomes Andy's confidante regarding his relationship with Angela Martin, Dwight's former girlfriend. Dwight's spirits are lifted when he learns that, during a makeout session with Andy, Angela cried, "Oh, D!". Andy assumes "D" is a diminutive for Andy.

After the corporate headquarters rejects Michael's ad, the office employees gather at Poor Richard's Pub to watch the professionally filmed commercial, which Michael refers to as "the world premiere of corporate crapfest." After the commercial, Jim plays Michael's version of the ad on the bar's television set. Over the theme from Chariots of Fire, as Michael narrates trite catchphrases, a sheet of paper is depicted making a journey around the world, carrying a variety of messages meaningful to the recipients; Pam's animated whirling sheets of paper coalesce into the company logo to end the ad. The employees as well as the other patrons of the bar show their approval.

Andy, still trying to recall the product name from the jingle on the basis that it has to rhyme, incorrectly concludes that it promotes Fancy Feast cat food.

== Production ==
"Local Ad" was the seventh episode of the series written by B. J. Novak, who also acts in the show as Ryan Howard, and the first episode of the series directed by Jason Reitman, who directed the films Juno and Thank You for Smoking. When speaking about his directorial experience with The Office, Reitman stated that "Anyhow, the whole experience was awesome. They're all geniuses over there. I didn’t have to contribute much at the end of the day because they're all so on their game." He also stated that "Weird moment of production design surprise – There's a three ring binder on Creed's desk with the logo from the Academy of Tobacco Studies that we created for [Thank You For] Smoking. I have no idea how it got there and neither does he." B.J. Novak's brother Jesse, a musician, contributed by writing the second commercial jingle in the episode, and the third jingle was written by Craig Robinson, the actor who plays reoccurring character Darryl Philbin and leads the cast members in performing both the second and third jingle.

The Second Life scenes in "Local Ad" were produced by Clear Ink of Berkeley, CA, using existing locations within Second Life as well as virtual sets created for the episode. In a study made by IAG Research, the appearance of Second Life in "Local Ad" was rated eighth in the top ten most effective product placements of 2007. The Office was the only non-reality show to make the list, and Second Life was the only product on the list that did not pay for its placement.

The two sides of Michael and Ryan's phone conversation were filmed simultaneously, with a second unit shooting Ryan's part.

Scenes which were filmed for the episode but deleted include Toby suggesting the ad be filmed in slow-motion, Jim and Michael roleplaying as a producer and an artistically idealistic director, and Jim encasing Dwight's rocket launcher in gelatin in Second Life.

== Reception ==
"Local Ad" received a 5.2 Nielsen rating and an 8% Share. The episode was watched by an estimate audience of 8.98 million viewers and achieved a 4.7/11 in the key adults 18–49 demographic. This means that 4.1 percent of all people aged 18–49 viewed the episode, and eleven percent of all people watching television at the time viewed the episode.

"Local Ad" received generally favorable reviews from critics. Travis Fickett of IGN gave the episode a favorable review, saying "This episode is a prime example of how The Office is able to do broad comedy while at the same time treating its characters as real people." Fickett went on to praise the acting of Rainn Wilson as a depressed Dwight, as well as the story's twist. Fickett stated that "A great twist here is that we think we're watching Michael pilot a sinking ship as usual, but in fact – the ad is quite good. There's some clever stuff in there, albeit some of it not exactly professional in its production, but Michael doesn't do such a bad job." Like Fickett, Christine Fenno of Entertainment Weekly gave the episode a favorable review. Fenno said that "The premise of this episode, 'Local Ad' — the Scranton staffers shoot a commercial — was strong, and allowed almost every ensemble member to shine." Fenno also praised the acting work of Ed Helms as Andy, as well as Steve Carell as Michael. Oscar Dahl, a senior writer for BuddyTV, praised the episode, but also felt that its thirty-minute length created a stark contrast to the previous four episodes' hour-long run, saying "tonight's episode felt short. Really short."

For his work on this episode, B. J. Novak was nominated for a Writers Guild of America Award for Best Screenplay – Episodic Comedy, but lost to another episode of The Office, "The Job."
