= Lester Lewis =

American television producer and writer (1966–2013)

- Born: November 26, 1966; Illinois, U.S.
- Died: March 19, 2013 (aged 46); Santa Monica, California, U.S.
- Occupations: Television writer Television producer
- Spouse: Tracy Lewis
- Children: 2

Lester "Les" Lewis (November 26, 1966 – March 19, 2013) was an American television writer and producer, whose credits included sitcoms such as Flight of the Conchords, Caroline in the City and The Larry Sanders Show. He was a supervising producer and writer on The Office (U.S. version).

== Career ==
He was developing a musical series for the Disney Channel which was tentatively titled Madison High. He appeared at San Diego Comic-Con in 2008 for a The Office (U.S. version) panel.

== Death ==
Lewis died by suicide on March 19, 2013, aged 46.

== Filmography ==
Written credits for The Office

1. "The Deposition" (November 15, 2007) - Season 4
2. "Customer Survey" (November 6, 2008) - Season 5
