= Kate Flannery =

American actress (born 1964)

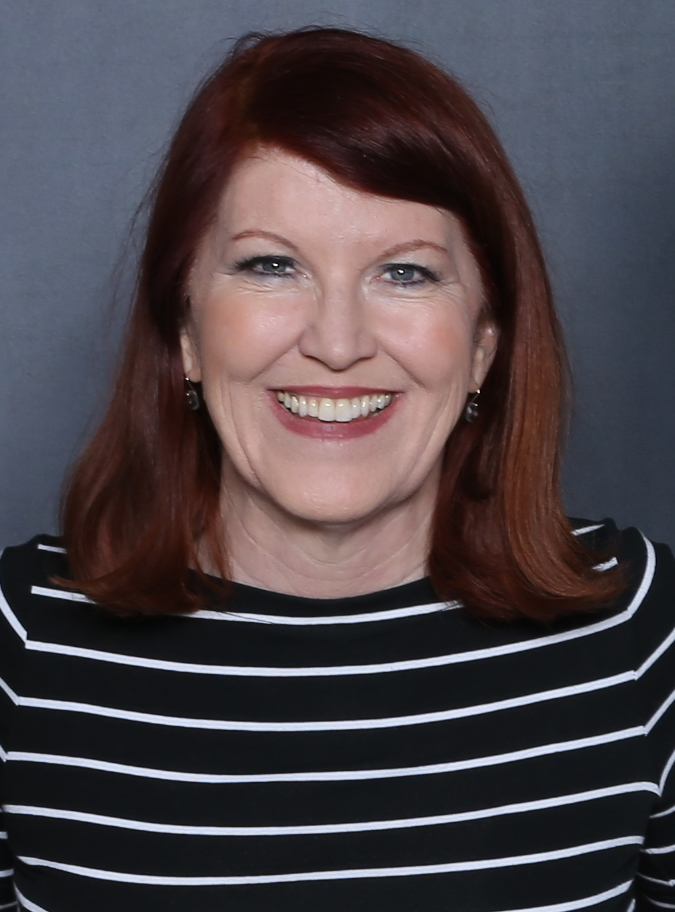
- Flannery in 2018
- Born: June 10, 1964 (age 62); Philadelphia, Pennsylvania, U.S.
- Education: University of the Arts
- Occupation: Actress
- Years active: 1989–present
- Partner(s): Chris Haston (2006–present)

Kate Flannery (born June 10, 1964) is an American actress. Following her early theatre work, Flannery had her screen breakthrough playing Meredith Palmer on the NBC series The Office, which won her two Screen Actors Guild Awards. She went on to guest star on CBS shows Magnum P.I. and Young Sheldon. She competed on the 28th season of Dancing with the Stars and voiced Barb on the animated series Steven Universe. She also appeared on the American version of Who Wants to Be a Millionaire? with Jimmy Kimmel, where on September 25, 2025 she won the top prize of $1 million.

== Early life ==
Flannery was born in Philadelphia, Pennsylvania, daughter of Tom and Joan Flannery, and was raised in the suburb Ardmore, Pennsylvania. She studied for two years at Shenandoah Conservatory in Virginia and then transferred to the University of the Arts in Philadelphia. She has five sisters and a brother, and is three minutes younger than her twin sister, who is a social worker.

== Career ==
A former member of The Second City's National Touring Company, Flannery is an original member of Chicago's Annoyance Theatre, where she appeared in over 15 shows including The Miss Vagina Pageant and The Real Live Brady Bunch.

The Lampshades, a cult comedy lounge act consisting of Flannery and veteran improviser Scot Robinson, has been running in Hollywood and in comedy festivals since 2001 and was seen at the U.S. Comedy Arts Festival in Aspen, Colorado. The Lampshades was New York magazine's "LA Pick" for 2006, and was declared "Best Saturday Comedy Show of the Year" by LA Weekly.

Flannery appeared as the alcoholic, divorced, single mother Meredith Palmer on the television comedy The Office, following appearances on The Bernie Mac Show, Boomtown, Curb Your Enthusiasm, and Jimmy Kimmel Live!. The Office earned her and the rest of its cast acclaim, along with several accolades, such as winning two Screen Actors Guild Awards for Outstanding Performance by an Ensemble in a Comedy Series, with an additional five nominations for the same award. In 2008, Flannery was a talent scout on Last Comic Standing with her Office costar Brian Baumgartner, and she appeared with the cast of The Office on Celebrity Family Feud.

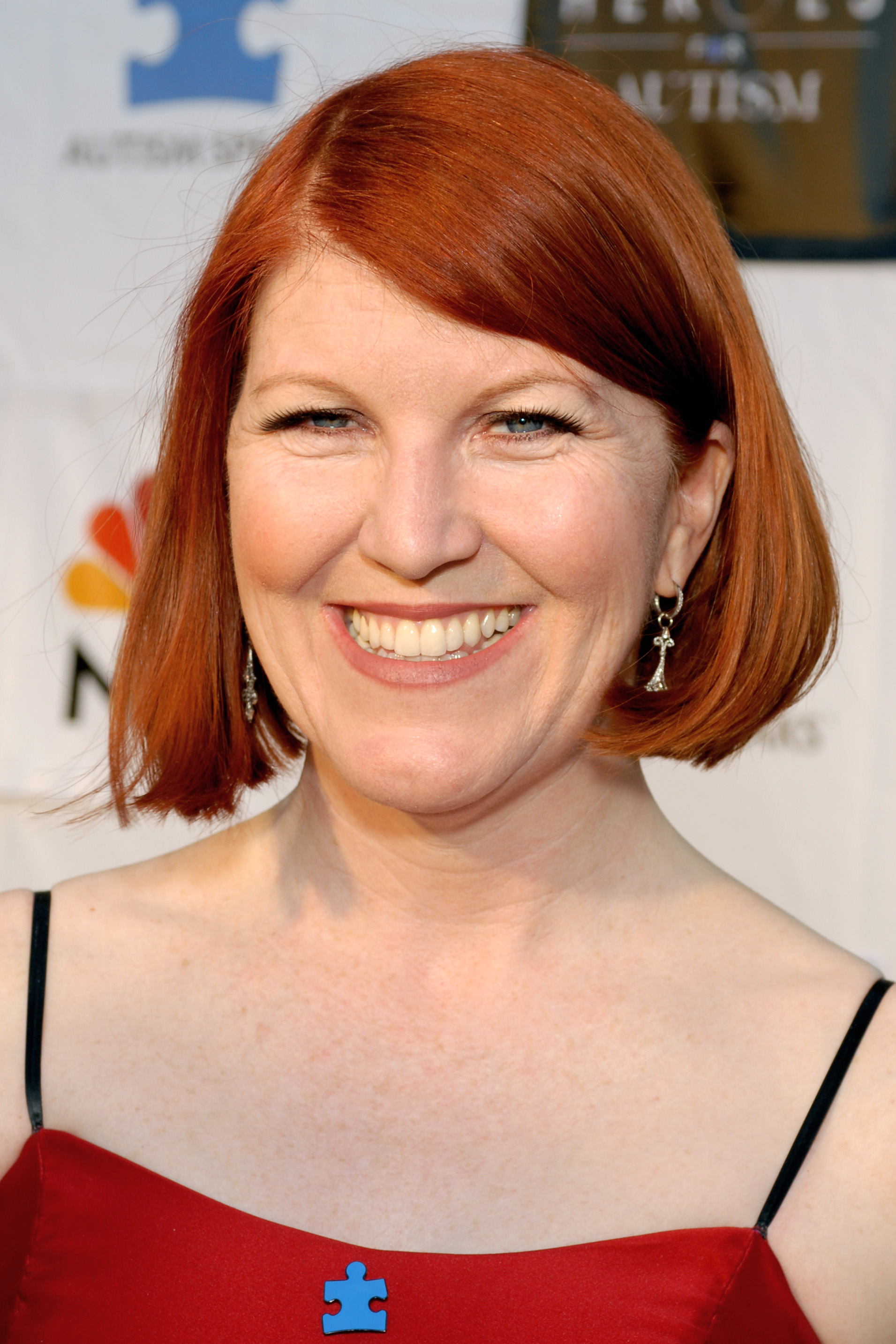
Flannery in 2009

In 2010, Flannery played Harper's mom on the Disney Channel's Wizards of Waverly Place as Elaine Finkle. Flannery also appeared as a judge in a 2009 episode of Iron Chef America. Flannery has been touring with Jane Lynch as her sidekick on stage since 2013 in her show See Jane Sing with Tim Davis and the Tony Guerrero Quintet, playing the Kennedy Center, Joe's Pub, the Borgata and 30 cities.

Flannery was in the long running New York hit, Nora Ephron's Love, Loss, and What I Wore. She also played Neely O'Hara in the 1996 off-Broadway musical Valley of the Dolls, an adaptation of the 1967 film, at the Circle in the Square Theatre in New York City and Los Angeles. Also in Los Angeles, she played the teen prostitute and Blair's sister in The Phacts of Life at the Renberg Theatre and in the Lily Tomlin/Jane Wagner production of Three Feet Under at The Evidence Room. Jane Lynch's Christmas album A Swingin' Little Christmas features Kate Flannery, and reached #8 on the Billboard top 100 charts.

Flannery also appeared on The Jay Leno Show portraying Wendy in a skit at the time of the burger chain's 40th anniversary. She was a contestant on 19 episodes of Celebrity Name Game, two episodes of Hollywood Game Night with Jane Lynch. Flannery also appeared on Don't Forget the Lyrics and hosted Standup in Stilettos for two seasons on the TV Guide network. She is the former musical director of the Los Angeles Drama Club, teaching Shakespeare to children and young adults.

In 2016, she had a recurring role on ABC's American Housewife as Crossing Guard Sandy, played a janitor in an episode of Brooklyn Nine-Nine, appeared on FOX's New Girl and MTV's Mary + Jane, and in 2017, recurred on Cartoon Network's Steven Universe as Barbara "Barb" Miller. Flannery was a member of the band Mono Puff under the stage name "Lady Puff". She toured with the band and sang on their second album, It's Fun to Steal.

In 2019, Flannery was announced as one of the celebrities to compete on season 28 of Dancing with the Stars. She was partnered with first-time professional Pasha Pashkov and was eliminated fifth. She joined the show's live tour in 2020, but it was cut short due to the COVID-19 pandemic.

In 2022, it was announced that Flannery would star in the comedy film Plan B alongside Jon Heder, Tom Berenger, and Shannon Elizabeth.

In 2024, Flannery competed in season eleven of The Masked Singer as "Starfish". She was eliminated on "Queen Night" alongside Charlie Wilson as "Ugly Sweater".

In 2025, Flannery appeared on Who Wants to Be a Millionaire alongside her co-star from The Office, Oscar Nuñez. She and Nuñez went on to win the million-dollar top prize, becoming only the fourth celebrities and the seventeenth overall to do so, splitting $500,000 each for their respective charities, Philabundance and Planned Parenthood.

== Filmography ==
=== Film ===
Year	Title	Role	Notes
1999	Can't Stop Dancing	Tonia	
1999	Trick	Ridiculous Writer	
2000	Amy Stiller's Breast	Reporter	Short film
2002	Life Without Dick	Crampy Legs Partygoer	
2003	Carolina	Café Waitress	
2005	The Heir Apparent	Heidi	Short film
2005	I'm Not Gay	Secretary	Short film
2006	Danny Roane: First Time Director	Marla	
2007	Jesus People	Sharon Nyenhuis	Short film
2007	Wild Girls Gone	Reading Circle #4	
2009	Coco Lipshitz: Behind the Laughter	Reporter	Short film
2009	You	Airline Counter Girl	
2010	Finger Babies	Teacher	Video short
2012	Love or Whatever	Rosemary	
2014	At the Devil's Door	Rosemary	
2014	Break Point	Commonwealth Rep	
2014	Helicopter Mom	Norma	
2014	Cooties	Charman	
2015	Emergency Contact	Carol	Short film
2015	Dial a Prayer	Cora's coworker	
2015	Slow Learners	Principal Miller	
2016	4th Man Out	Karen	
2017	How to Get Girls	Linda Fox	
2018	Fishbowl California	Susan	
2018	Stuck	Ms. Jenkins	
2020	Golden Arm	Randy	
2022	The Prank	Loretta	
2024	Micro Budget	Janine	

=== Television ===
Year	Title	Role	Notes
2001	Spyder Games	Bunny	Recurring role (5 episodes)
2002	Curb Your Enthusiasm	Cop #2	Episode: "The Corpse-Sniffing Dog"
2002	Saturday Night Live	Lucy (voice)	Episode: "Al Gore/Phish"
2003	Boomtown	Tracey	Episode: "Inadmissable"
2004	Crossballs: The Debate Show		Episode: "Plastic Surgery: Nip-pocalypse?"
2004	The Bernie Mac Show	Christopher's Mom	Episode: "Stiff Upper Lip"
2005–2013	The Office	Meredith Palmer	Main role (187 episodes)
2006	The Office: The Accountants	Meredith Palmer	Episode: "Meredith"
2008	The Office: The Outburst	Meredith Palmer	Episode: "The Explanation"
2008	Iron Chef America	Herself, judge	Episode: "Morimoto vs. Mason"
2009	Rise and Fall of Tuck Johnson	Nikki Strokums	
2009	The Office: Blackmail	Meredith Palmer	
2009	The Jay Leno Show	Wendy, Mrs. Claus	2 episodes
2010	Wizards of Waverly Place	Elaine Finkle	Episode: "Wizards vs. Finkles"
2010	The Office: The 3rd Floor	Meredith Palmer	2 episodes
2011	The Soup	Brenna	Episode: "The Soup Awards"
2011	The Christmas Pageant	Beverly Simmons	Television film
2011	The Life & Times of Tim	Irene, Jean Gillis (voice)	2 episodes
2013	Jessie	Corporal Cookie	Episode: "G.I. Jessie"
2013	Lakewood Plaza Turbo	Carol, Gertie (voice)	Pilot for OK K.O.! Let's Be Heroes
2015–2018	Steven Universe	Barb Miller (voice)	5 episodes
2015–2018	Another Period	Anne Sullivan	2 episodes
2016	Brooklyn Nine-Nine	"Mean" Marge Bronigan	Episode: "Adrian Pimento"
2016	New Girl	Mary Ellen	Episode: "Hubbedy Bubby"
2016	Disengaged	Chef	Super Deluxe web series; episode "Food and Wine"
2016	American Housewife	Crossing Guard Sandy	2 episodes
2017	Kevin (Probably) Saves the World	Ann Russo	Episode: "How to Be Good"
2017–2019	OK K.O.! Let's Be Heroes	Carol (voice)	Main cast
2018	All Night	Principal Saperstein	9 episodes
2018	Liza on Demand	Karaoke Woman	Episode: "MoJoe"
2019	Young Sheldon	Nurse Nora	Episode: "A Tummy Ache and a Whale of a Metaphor"
2019	Dancing with the Stars	Contestant	9 episodes
2019–2020	Summer Camp Island	Georgina (voice)	2 episodes
2021	That Girl Lay Lay	Mitzy	Episode: "Lay Lay the Legendary"
2021	Magnum P.I.	Erin	Episode: "Texas Wedge"
2022	PBC	Jessica	
2023; 2025	Kiff	Agnes, Kion (voice)	3 episodes
2023	Is It Cake?	Herself / Judge	Episode: "S'more Cake Please"
2024	Hell's Kitchen	Herself	Guest diner; episode: "#HellishHangover"
2024	The Masked Singer	Herself/Starfish	Season 11 contestant
2025	Night Court	Marge	Episode: "The Jakeout"
2025	Who Wants to Be a Millionaire	Herself	Contestant
2026	Abbott Elementary	Joy Crawford	Episode: "Miami"

=== Video games ===
Year	Title	Role	Notes
2018	OK K.O.! Let's Play Heroes	Carol	

==== Dancing with the Stars performances ====
Week #	Dance/Song	Judges' score			Result
Week #	Dance/Song	Inaba	Goodman	Tonioli	Result
1	Cha-cha-cha / "She Works Hard for the Money"	5	5	5	No Elimination
2	Foxtrot / "Fly Me to the Moon"	7	7	7	Safe
3	Quickstep / "9 to 5"	8	8	8	Safe
4	Argentine Tango/ "Hands to Myself"	7	7^{1}/6	6	Safe
5	Jazz / "A Spoonful of Sugar"	8	8	8	No Elimination
6	Viennese waltz / "I Have Nothing"	9	9	9	Safe
7	Rumba /"Wicked Game"; Team Freestyle / "Sweet Dreams"	8; 8	8; 8	8; 8	Bottom Two
8	Jive /""Heat Wave""; Cha-Cha-Cha / "Gonna Make You Sweat (Everybody Dance Now)"	8 Won	8 Dance	8 Off	Eliminated

^{1} Score given by guest judge Leah Remini.

== Awards and nominations ==
List of awards and nominations received by Kate Flannery
Year	Award	Category	Work	Result
2018	Behind the Voice Actors Awards	Best Female Vocal Performance in a Television Series in a Guest Role	Steven Universe	Nominated
2018	Behind the Voice Actors Awards	Best Vocal Ensemble in a New Television Series	OK K.O.! Let's Be Heroes	Nominated
2006	Gold Derby Awards	Ensemble of the Year	The Office	Nominated
2007	Gold Derby Awards	Ensemble of the Year	The Office	Won
2008	Gold Derby Awards	Ensemble of the Year	The Office	Nominated
2009	Gold Derby Awards	Ensemble of the Year	The Office	Nominated
2007	Screen Actors Guild Awards	Outstanding Performance by an Ensemble in a Comedy Series	The Office	Won
2008	Screen Actors Guild Awards	Outstanding Performance by an Ensemble in a Comedy Series	The Office	Won
2009	Screen Actors Guild Awards	Outstanding Performance by an Ensemble in a Comedy Series	The Office	Nominated
2010	Screen Actors Guild Awards	Outstanding Performance by an Ensemble in a Comedy Series	The Office	Nominated
2011	Screen Actors Guild Awards	Outstanding Performance by an Ensemble in a Comedy Series	The Office	Nominated
2012	Screen Actors Guild Awards	Outstanding Performance by an Ensemble in a Comedy Series	The Office	Nominated
2013	Screen Actors Guild Awards	Outstanding Performance by an Ensemble in a Comedy Series	The Office	Nominated
2008	TV Land Awards	Future Classic Award	The Office	Won
