= Lieberstein =

Lieberstein is a surname. Notable people with the surname include:

- Paul Lieberstein (born 1967), a writer, producer, and as supporting cast member Toby Flenderson on the U.S. version of the sitcom The Office
- Warren Lieberstein (born 1968), American writer, producer and brother of Paul Lieberstein
