= China (The Office) =

- The Office episode
- Episode no.: Season 7 Episode 10
- Directed by: Charles McDougall
- Written by: Halsted Sullivan; Warren Lieberstein
- Cinematography by: Matt Sohn
- Editing by: Claire Scanlon
- Production code: 7010
- Original air date: December 2, 2010
- Running time: 22 minutes

Guest appearance
- Hugh Dane as Hank Tate

Episode chronology
← Previous "WUPHF.com"	Next → "Classy Christmas"
- The Office (American season 7)

"China" is the tenth episode of the seventh season of the American comedy television series The Office and the show's 136th episode overall. It originally aired on NBC on December 2, 2010. The episode was written by Halsted Sullivan and Warren Lieberstein, and directed by Charles McDougall. The episode guest stars Mark Proksch as Nate and Hugh Dane as Hank.

The series depicts the everyday lives of office employees in the Scranton, Pennsylvania branch of the fictional Dunder Mifflin Paper Company. In this episode, Michael Scott (Steve Carell) reads an article about China growing as a global power and decides it must be stopped before it overtakes the United States. Pam Halpert (Jenna Fischer) threatens to move the office into a new building after everyone complains about Dwight Schrute's (Rainn Wilson) lax building standards. Darryl Philbin (Craig Robinson) is sick of Andy Bernard's (Ed Helms) annoying text messages.

The episode received largely positive reviews from television critics, many of whom felt that the confrontation between Oscar and Michael was realistic and humorous. "China" was viewed by 7.31 million viewers and received a 3.7 rating among adults between the age of 18 and 49, marking a slight drop in the ratings when compared to the previous week. Despite this, the episode was the highest-rated NBC series of the night that it aired, as well as the highest-rated non-sports NBC broadcast for the week it aired.

== Synopsis ==
While at the dentist, Michael Scott reads an article about China's growing global power, and decides that China must be stopped before it overtakes the United States. Oscar Martinez tries to correct one of the statements, but when Ryan Howard checks the fact online, it turns out Michael's statement was correct. Everyone mocks Oscar for his mistake, as Oscar is usually the smartest one in the office, having built this reputation by correcting his coworkers. Oscar invites Michael for a cup of coffee to discuss China in more detail, but the other employees realize he is trying to reestablish himself as the office's intellectual heavyweight. Seeing an opportunity to give Oscar a taste of his own medicine, they start quizzing Michael on facts about China, but he cannot answer, so Ryan gives him note cards to keep track. When Michael and Oscar have their conversation, Ryan, Erin, Jim, Andy, and Kelly also sit in to watch. Michael blanks on one topic, but then changes the subject to conversation itself. The employees toast him, while Oscar is left infuriated.

Everyone in the office complains about Dwight Schrute's building standards, such as half-plying toilet paper, adding motion sensors to the lights, and placing a roach billboard over the windows to the office. Pam Halpert, as office administrator, threatens to move everyone to a different building if nothing is done. She leaves and comes back with pictures of a newer office space and says they can move in three months. Dwight investigates and finds that the office building does not exist. When Dwight plays coy around Pam, she admits to Jim Halpert that she lied about the office building and that she is afraid of failing again after failing as an artist and a salesperson. Jim tries in vain to reassure her, and she breaks down in tears. Later Nate, Dwight's building assistant, discreetly gives Pam a book on the state building regulations. Pam shows Dwight that his policies are in violation of the laws written in the book, so Dwight puts everything back to normal. The camera crew confronts Dwight with footage showing that he overheard Pam's conversation with Jim and instructed Nate to give her the book on the building regulations. Dwight admits that he allowed her to win, but mocks the idea that he did so out of compassion.

Darryl Philbin is sick of Andy Bernard's pointless text messages. After one text, Darryl tells Andy that he is one bad text away from being blocked, but Andy wagers that he is one good text from a high five, to which Darryl agrees. Andy eventually texts Darryl, telling him to come to the parking lot, where there are pigeons eating an ice cream cone. Darryl laughs and gives Andy a high five.

== Production ==
"China" was written by producers Halsted Sullivan and Warren Lieberstein, their fourth writing credit on the series. Warren Lieberstein is the brother of Paul Lieberstein, who was the showrunner of the show at the time. The entry was directed by Charles McDougall, his fifth directing credit on the series. "China" is the third episode to feature Nate, played by YouTube star Mark Proksch. After the producers of The Office saw a series of prank videos that Proksch did under the name "Kenny Strasser", they hired him to become a recurring character.

The season seven DVD contains two deleted scenes from this episode: Michael venting his frustration about China being poised to surpass the U.S., and Nate swapping an "energy-saving cord" for an "un-energy-saving cord". It also contains several extensions of broadcast scenes, such as Jim reacting to the photos of the new office space by complaining that Pam used his camera without asking permission.

== Cultural references ==
Michael is initially worked up about China after reading an article in Newsweek, an American weekly news magazine. Michael notes that he was forced to read Newsweek in the waiting room at his dentist's office because some "kid had the magazine I wanted to read", hinting that the magazine Michael wanted to read was the children's magazine Highlights for Children. Andy sends Darryl a text that only reads "Megan Fox", a reference to the actress. Creed notes that he understands, but cannot speak, pirate slang. Andy attempts to motivate Michael with a pep talk taken from the 1979 movie Rocky II. During Michael and Oscar's discussion in the lobby of the office building, a copy of Call of Duty can be seen behind the counter. Fans have interpreted this as a reference to the third season episode "The Coup", which used the game as a plot device.

== Reception ==
In its original American broadcast on December 2, 2010, "China" was viewed by an estimated 7.31 million viewers and received a 3.7 rating/10 percent share among adults between the ages of 18 and 49. This means that it was seen by 3.7 percent of all 18- to 49-year-olds, and 10 percent of all 18- to 49-year-olds watching television at the time of the broadcast. This marked a slight drop in the ratings after one week off due to Thanksgiving. The episode became the highest-rated non-sports related NBC program for the original week it aired and also became the ninth most-watched show for the week of broadcast among adults aged 18–49.

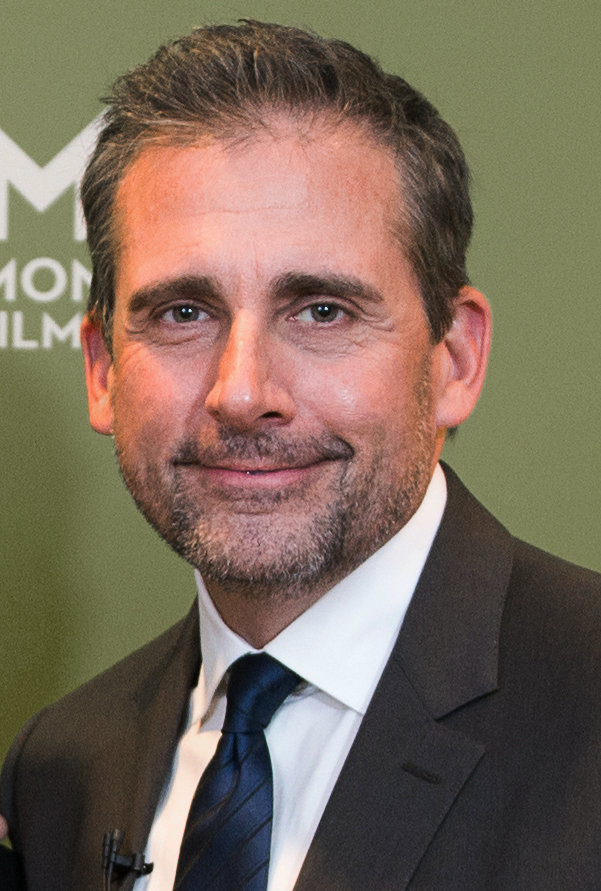
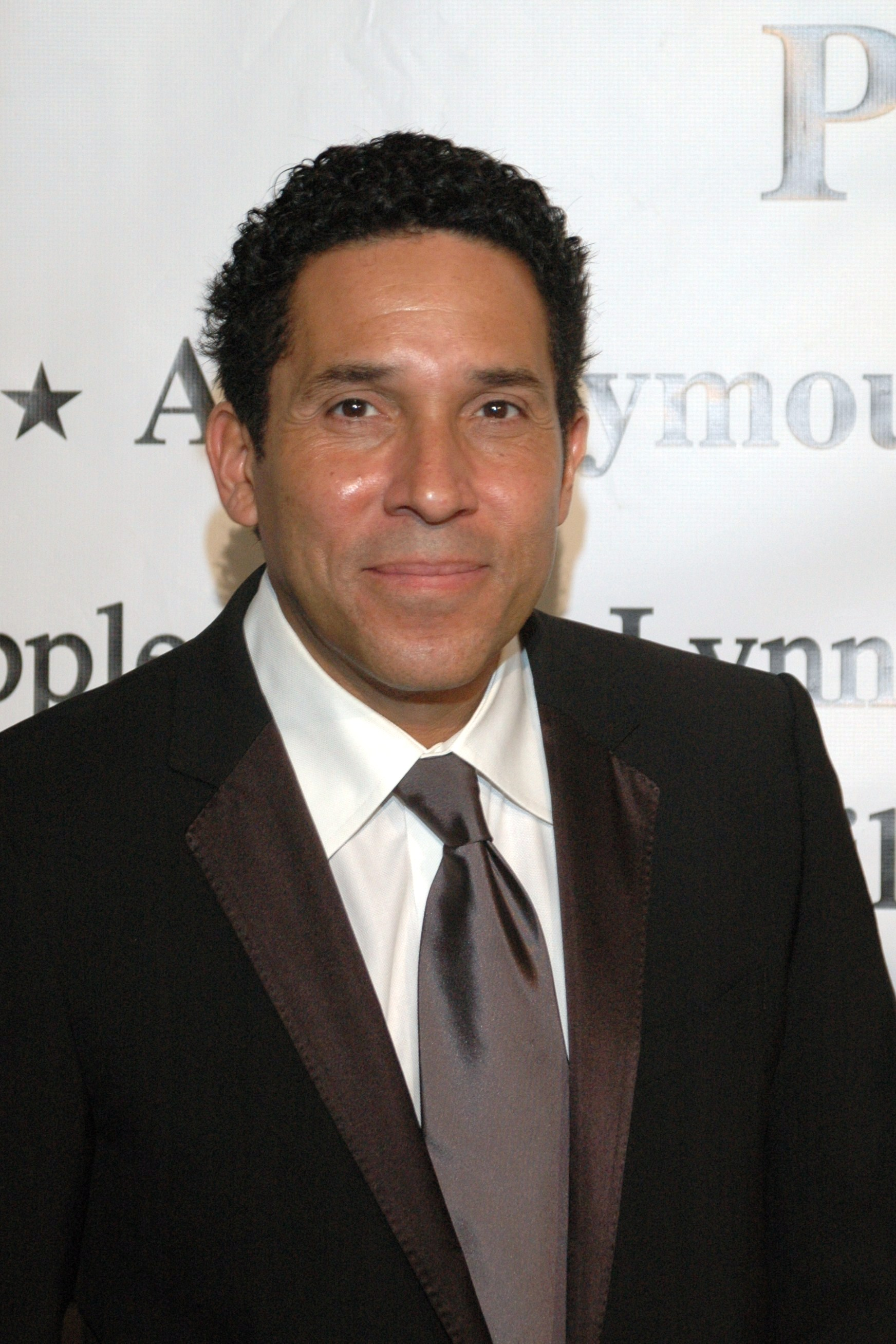
Steve Carell (left) and Oscar Nunez's (right) plot received particularly positive reviews from critics.

This episode received positive reviews. Phoebe Reilly of Vulture wrote highly of the episode and called it "the best of the season so far." James Poniewoznik of Time compared the episode and the season at large to the later work of The Beatles; he noted that, "after becoming known for a string of ambitious" entries, they both "decide[d] to take a step backward stylistically". For this reason, he enjoyed "China", and opined that "The China plot, which thankfully focused less on Michael's craziness than his (and his coworkers') relationship with Oscar, demonstrated how well-drawn the show has been even when it comes to its more peripheral characters." He also said the episode was "vintage Office."

Bonnie Stiernberg of Paste magazine wrote highly of the episode and called it "a half hour of heartwarming comedy". She was particularly pleased with how Michael was able to overcome Oscar with pathos, and she enjoyed the episode's subplots. Dan Forcella of TV Fanatic praised the episode and awarded it five stars out of five. He wrote that "If my favorite thing for Jim to do is prank Dwight, my second favorite is when he backs Michael." Furthermore, he wrote that "While this A story was filled with plenty of laughs, [...] Dwight's B story was absolutely murderous [and] all gold". He also felt that the C plot was enjoyable, because "Andy is great in small doses".

Myles McNutt of The A.V. Club awarded the episode a "B+" grade. He noted that The Office was not suited for political examination, because, as the show is grounded in reality, the concept of the office as "a microcosm for global politics is … uneven." However, McNutt argued that because the show used the conceit of China as a "red herring [...] to introduce a story about Oscar as 'Actually,' and the gap between Michael’s rhetorical potential and his actual knowledge of just about any subject", the story "steps back and finds a small moment within [the larger] conflict." McNutt also enjoyed the B-plot with Pam and Dwight, noting that the ending was "honestly quite sweet".
