= Cafe Disco =

- The Office episode
- Episode no.: Season 5 Episode 27
- Directed by: Randall Einhorn
- Written by: Warren Lieberstein; Halsted Sullivan
- Cinematography by: Matt Sohn
- Editing by: Stuart Bass
- Production code: 527
- Original air date: May 7, 2009

Guest appearances
- Ellie Kemper as Erin Hannon; Bobby Ray Shafer as Bob Vance; Lisa K. Wyatt as Lynn

Episode chronology
← Previous "Casual Friday"	Next → "Company Picnic"
- The Office (American season 5)

"Cafe Disco" is the twenty-seventh and penultimate episode of the fifth season of the American comedy television series The Office and the 99th overall episode of the series. It originally aired on NBC in the United States on May 7, 2009. Feeling the office is overworked after the recent reign of Charles Miner, Michael sets up a "cafe disco" in his old Michael Scott Paper Company office. Phyllis injures her back dancing at the cafe disco and bonds with Dwight as he tries to relieve her back. Meanwhile, Jim and Pam plan to elope.

The episode was written by Warren Lieberstein and Halsted Sullivan and directed by Randall Einhorn. Several songs are featured in the episode, including "Car Wash" by Rose Royce, "Cat People" by David Bowie, "Gonna Make You Sweat (Everybody Dance Now)" by C+C Music Factory and "Y.M.C.A." by Village People. The episode received generally positive reviews and, according to Nielsen ratings, was watched by 7.71 million viewers during its original broadcast.

== Plot ==
Michael Scott still has his lease on the closet he used as the office space for the Michael Scott Paper Company. Concerned that the office is still tense from the recent management by Dunder Mifflin vice president Charles Miner, Michael converts the closet into a dance hall called Cafe Disco for his employees to socialize, drink coffee and dance. None of the employees care to join him (with the brief exceptions of Erin Hannon, who comes in to turn in forms, and Kevin Malone, who is forced to leave). Michael blasts music through the ventilation system to tempt them to come.

Phyllis Vance ultimately gives in and joins Michael; she stops in to invite her husband Bob Vance but his secretary, who resembles Phyllis, tells her Bob is not available. In Cafe Disco, Phyllis throws out her back dancing. Dwight Schrute brings her into the conference room and gives her the massage he usually gives injured horses. She eventually confides in Dwight that she fears her husband will have an affair with his new secretary, but the two laugh together when Phyllis realizes how ridiculous the idea sounds.

When the rest of the office is told of Phyllis' injury, they take this as confirmation that Cafe Disco is a bad idea and reprimand Michael. Disappointed and angry, Michael instructs Erin to close up Cafe Disco. Kelly Kapoor comes down with her and the two start dancing after Erin turns on the stereo. This catches the eye of two male employees from Vance Refrigeration, and soon Cafe Disco is full of both Dunder Mifflin employees and non-employees, much to Michael's delight. Kelly and Andy Bernard get into a competitive dance-off with each other, and Kevin makes out in the corner with his girlfriend Lynne.

Meanwhile, Jim Halpert and Pam Beesly decide to avoid the expense and stress of a wedding and elope to a simple courthouse ceremony in Youngstown, Ohio. Pam comes to work with a wedding dress and Jim picks up flowers in the office parking lot. As they are leaving, they stop in at Cafe Disco, and end up having a lot of fun, making them decide they want an actual wedding ceremony after all. Phyllis eventually recovers and dances with Bob in Cafe Disco. Michael encourages Angela Martin to dance, but she refuses because she does not like "the general spirit of music." When Angela starts softly shaking her foot to the beat, however, Michael is satisfied with the small victory. An extremely nervous Andy gets his ear pierced by Kelly with a pin in the bathroom.

== Production ==
"Essentially Michael has another terrible idea on how to let off some steam in the office and the concept of a café disco emerges, which is a dancing situation that involves coffee. I'm not a good dancer, but I try really, really hard, and I'm not talking about Andy Bernard, I'm talking about Ed Helms."

— Ed Helms, about Cafe Disco

"Cafe Disco" was written by Warren Lieberstein and Halsted Sullivan and directed by Randall Einhorn. The Office writers Gene Stupnitsky and Lee Eisenberg appear in cameos as Vance Refrigeration employees who attend the Cafe Disco dance after spotting Kelly and Erin dancing together. Ed Helms, who describes himself as a poor dancer, said he found the dancing scenes very challenging and that he was very sore by the end of the filming.

The official website for The Office included four cut scenes from "Cafe Disco" within a week of its original release. In the first 80-second clip, Kevin meets Lynne in the elevator, where he tells her she smells like bacon, and says "I love the smell of bacon in the morning." Later, he invites Lynne to Cafe Disco. In the second, 47-second clip, Michael insists he will not let the fun stop in the office, and tells the story of his grandfather, who he said was the most fun person until he was changed by his job. In the third, 30-second clip, Dwight talks to Phyllis about his experience in his high school girls' softball team, which he was able to join due to the "landmark" Pennsylvania Supreme Court case, "Shrute vs. Lackawanna County Board of Education". In the final, 30-second-clip, Dwight tells the documentary crew about his hatred for Ohio, the home of his cousin Amel, who he says should be kicked in the "groin area" because he's a "cheat and a ball hog."

== Cultural references ==
The episode features the songs "Car Wash" by Rose Royce, "Cat People" by David Bowie, "Gonna Make You Sweat (Everybody Dance Now)" by C+C Music Factory, "Y.M.C.A." by Village People, "Boy Hangover" written by Lester Lewis, sung by Bonnie McKee, "I'll Do You like a Truck" by Geo da Silva, "Climb on Board The Train" by Destination Soul, "Pimpin'" by Tian & Styliztic, "Whiplash" by Image, and "Various Disgraces" by The Blam.

During their dance competition, Andy does a dance involving a chair from the music video of the Madonna song "Vogue", and Kelly does a reenactment of the silhouette chair dance from the 1983 romance film Flashdance, which inspired elements of a dance done by actress Vanessa Ferlito in the 2007 Quentin Tarantino film Death Proof. Jim and Pam plan to drive to Youngstown, a city in Mahoning County, Ohio, to get married in a courthouse. Dwight does an impression of actor Jack Nicholson's character Jack Torrance from the 1980 Stanley Kubrick film The Shining. Michael likens the positive office atmosphere to that of Dave & Buster's, a restaurant and entertainment business. To signify the care-free atmosphere of Cafe Disco, Michael hangs on the wall a lei, a Hawaiian flower necklace. When his Cafe Disco idea is initially rejected, Michael says he can understand how it felt to be the tobacco company Philip Morris.

"Cafe Disco" includes several callbacks to previous The Office episodes. Michael blames Charles Miner, the new Dunder Mifflin vice president, for the poor atmosphere around the office; Charles was the antagonist of a recent six-episode story arc revolving around Michael's defection from Dunder Mifflin to the Michael Scott Paper Company. The office space used for Cafe Disco is the old Michael Scott Paper Company office space previously featured in the episodes "Michael Scott Paper Company", "Heavy Competition" and "Broke". The episode features Lynne (Lisa K. Wyatt) as Kevin's date at the dance; Lynne was introduced in "Blood Drive", the fifth season's Valentine's Day episode, where the two meet at an office singles party. Television reviewers also compared the bonding between Dwight and Phyllis in "Cafe Disco" as a throwback to "Crime Aid", an episode earlier in the season, in which Phyllis tries to console a saddened Dwight in the wake of Andy and Angela's engagement.

== Reception ==
In its original American broadcast on May 7, 2009, "Cafe Disco" was watched by 7.71 million viewers, according to Nielsen ratings, an increase from the previous week. The episode received a 4.5 rating/14 share among viewers aged between 18 and 34, and a 3.8 rating/11 share among viewers between 18 and 49. The episode outperformed the 3.5 rating/9 share of CBS' crime drama series CSI: Crime Scene Investigation in the 18—49 category. The Office creator Greg Daniels said he was particularly proud of this, especially in light of the series' upcoming 100th episode, "Company Picnic"; Daniels said of beating CSI, "Who would have thought that when we aired for the first time?"

The episode received generally positive reviews. Margaret Lyons of Entertainment Weekly praised the episode, comparing it positively to previous episodes "Casino Night" and "Booze Cruise": "not as heavy or emotional, certainly, but still a chance to see our Dunderheads in a charming and demonstrative not-quite-work environment." Lyons also complimented a number of changes in the series the episode seemed to indicate, including shifting allegiances, goodwill where there used to be bad and a possible budding romance between Andy and Kelly. Alan Sepinwall, television journalist with The Star-Ledger, said the episode, "started off seeming like a dumb and pointless idea before gradually revealing itself to be a fun, and even welcome, diversion." Sepinwall said the episode was not as funny as other recent ones, but that he enjoyed seeing the characters interact this way together, and particularly liked seeing Dwight and Phyllis bond, "even as he treated her like a racehorse". Josh McAuliffe of The Times-Tribune in Scranton, Pennsylvania, described the episode as "a wacky and wonderful little gem, one of those rare ones where it was just wall-to-wall happy, giddy fun, with not a drop of pathos, except for maybe Michael whining about having to eat lunch by himself." McAuliffe also said he was glad to see Erin's "cheerful, appealingly goofy personality" continue to emerge.

Nathin Rabin of The A.V. Club said the episode made him feel "borderline euphoric", and said of it, "With a light touch the show made an insightful point—that we need our dance-offs and workday discos and spontaneous expressions of delight." Travis Fickett of IGN said the episode had "an infectious sense of fun" and felt as if the show producers "just turned the camera on the cast's wrap party and let it roll a while". However, Fickett also said very little actually happened in the episode, which he said felt "mostly like filler" between the recently finished Michael Scott Paper Company arc and the following week's season finale, "Company Picnic". New York magazine writer Will Leitch also said the episode felt lighter than recent episodes, but he said, "that’s okay: They’ve earned a week off, and they sure seem to be having a lot of fun." He particularly praised the competition between Andy and Kelly, and Michael's dancing: "There are few funnier dancers than Steve Carell, particularly Steve Carell amped on coffee." Andy Shaw of TV Fodder said the episode allowed the entire cast to shine and included great chemistry between Phyllis Smith and Rainn Wilson. He also said he was glad to see Ellie Kemper get more screen time, "and not just because she's Office eye candy. She adds some freshness to the cast, as she's the only person at Dunder Mifflin right now who doesn't really know anything about all the drama and backstory, so she just takes Michael and everyone else for face value." Kelly West of Cinema Blend described "Cafe Disco" as "one of the most random episodes of The Office."

"Cafe Disco" was voted the seventh highest-rated episode out of 26 from the fifth season, according to an episode poll at the fansite OfficeTally; the episode was rated 8.49 out of 10.
