= Geo Da Silva =

Romanian DJ (born 1976)

- Also known as: Geo Da Silva
- Born: Constantin Gheorghe; June 12, 1976 (age 50); Timișoara, Romania
- Genre: House
- Occupations: Singer, DJ
- Years active: 1994–present
- Labels: Cat Music, Blanco y Negro, Voices Media
- Website: https://www.geodasilva.net/

Constantin Gheorghe (born 12 June 1976), better known by his stage name Geo Da Silva, is a Romanian DJ, MC, vocalist, entrepreneur and entertainer.

== "I'll Do You like a Truck" ==
In 2008, Gheorghe released a single "I'll Do You like a Truck" co-written with Silviu Paduraru. The song and video was first released in January 2008 in Romania by Romanian record label Cat Music. The song made its debut on Dutch Singles Chart at number 37 on August 30, 2008. The following week, the song fell out at number 70, and two weeks afterwards, fell out from the position 83. Two music videos of "I'll Do You like a Truck" were made, one of which was filmed in Ibiza. The song was used in the television program The Office on the twenty-seventh episode of the fifth season named "Cafe Disco".

== Discography ==
=== Singles ===
Year	Single	Peak positions
Year	Single	NED
2008	"I'll Do You like a Truck"	37
2012	"Hey Mr. Dj Get Up"	
2013	"Booma Yee" (with Jack Mazzoni)	
2013	"Giddy Up"	
2014	"Disco Disco Good Good"	
2014	"Awela Hey"	
2015	"Na Ru Ney"	
2015	"Morena"	
2015	"Bailando Conga"	
2015	"I Love You Baby"	
2016	"Noaptea-i Nebuna"	
2016	"I Wanna Feel Love"	
2016	"I Want You"	
2017	"Gypsy Mama"	

== See also ==
- List of music released by Romanian artists that has charted in major music markets
