= Central Park (TV series) =

2020 American musical animated sitcom

- Genre: Animated sitcom; Musical
- Created by: Josh Gad & Loren Bouchard & Nora Smith
- Voices of: Kristen Bell; Tituss Burgess; Daveed Diggs; Josh Gad; Kathryn Hahn; Leslie Odom Jr.; Stanley Tucci; Emmy Raver-Lampman
- Theme music composer: Kate Anderson; Elyssa Samsel
- Composers: Leo Birenberg; Elyssa Samsel; Brent Knopf; Elegant Too; John Dylan Keith
- Country of origin: United States
- Original language: English
- No. of seasons: 3
- No. of episodes: 39

Production
- Executive producers: Josh Gad; Loren Bouchard; Nora Smith; Halsted Sullivan; Jon Liebman; Marc Gurvitz; Robin Schwartz; Sanjay Shah; Janelle Momary-Neely; Steven Davis; Kelvin Yu
- Producers: Kevin Larsen; Lindsey Stoddart
- Editors: Kris Fitzgerald; Stephanie Earley; Matthew Parcone
- Running time: 22–27 minutes
- Production companies: Wilo Productions; Angry Child Productions; Bento Box Entertainment; Brillstein Entertainment Partners; 20th Television (Note: Known as 20th Century Fox Television for the first season.) (seasons 1–2); 20th Television Animation (season 3)

Original release
- Network: Apple TV+
- Release: May 29, 2020 – November 18, 2022

Related
- Bob's Burgers; The Great North

Central Park is an American musical animated sitcom created by Loren Bouchard, Nora Smith and Josh Gad for Apple TV+, using the same art style as Bouchard's previous series Bob's Burgers. The series premiered on May 29, 2020, and revolves around a family living in Central Park in New York City who must save it from a greedy land developer.

In March 2021, the series was given an early third season renewal and the second season premiered on June 25, 2021. The third season premiered on September 9, 2022. On December 3, 2023, Josh Gad revealed that the show had been cancelled after three seasons.

== Premise ==
Told through the eyes of a fourth wall-aware busker narrator, named Birdie, the musical series tells the story of the Tillerman–Hunter family who live in Edendale Castle in Central Park. Patriarch Owen (the dorky manager of the park), his wife Paige (a journalist always stuck with writing fluff pieces who hopes to write a real story), their daughter Molly (loves drawing comics about herself and a boy she has a crush on) and their son Cole (an emotional young boy who loves animals).

The family's life changes when an elderly heiress and entrepreneur named Bitsy Brandenham and her frequently abused assistant Helen plot to buy up all the land in Central Park and turn it into more condominiums, shops, and restaurants as a way of getting back at the world. The Tillermans must also deal with their issues and save the park.

== Cast ==
=== Main ===
- Kristen Bell (season 1) and Emmy Raver-Lampman (season 2–3) as Molly Tillerman, Owen and Paige's daughter; Cole's sister; she likes drawing her comic books about herself as a hair-powered superhero named Fista-Puffs who fights crime.
- Tituss Burgess as Cole Tillerman, Owen and Paige's son; Molly's brother; an emotional boy who covets Bitsy's dog, Shampagne, and shows more affection and care for him than Bitsy does. Burgess also voices Kelleth Vanbeaceler, author of "The Squirrel Quarrels", Cole's favorite fantasy series, in "Squirrel, Interrupted".
- Daveed Diggs as Helen, Bitsy's assistant; she endures frequent abuse from her employer in hopes of one day inheriting the Brandenham fortune.
- Josh Gad as Birdie, a busker at the park and the show's narrator who gleefully talks about the events while also offering friendly, albeit occasionally annoying, support for Owen. Birdie has trouble staying professional in his work. He believes a narrator's job is to act as a guardian angel to the protagonists in the story they are following.
- Kathryn Hahn as Paige Hunter, Molly and Cole's mother; Owen's wife; a reporter for a not very notable New York newspaper who wants to report on real stories and not fluff pieces so that she can prove her worth.
- Leslie Odom Jr. as Owen Tillerman, Molly and Cole's father; Paige's husband; the park manager who wishes that the park, which he worships, was treated as carefully as he treats it.
- Stanley Tucci as Bitsy Brandenham, a business entrepreneur who wants to replace Central Park with a bunch of condos and retail space for personal reasons. She is the owner of Shampagne, a Shi-Poo that she unknowingly abuses and Cole is unhealthily obsessed with. She is the owner of Brandenham Hotel in Manhattan.
  - Keala Settle as Young Bitsy.
- Kristen Bell as Abby Hunter (season 3), Paige's sister who moves to New York to follow her dream of being a successful actress.

=== Recurring ===
- H. Jon Benjamin as Whitney Whitebottom, the Mayor of New York City who is in league with Bitsy. He later resigns as mayor after Paige exposed him.
- Eugene Cordero as Brendan Brandenham, a boy that Molly secretly has a crush on and often flies his kite in the park. Molly fantasizes about him as her superhero partner Kite-Boy. He is the grand-nephew of Bitsy Brandenham and opposes her plan to buy Central Park upon learning about it.
- Rory O'Malley as Elwood, a park ranger and Owen's partner who always seems in over his head. He has a pet worm named Diane and has a natural rhythm.
- David Herman as Dmitiry (season 1), a Russian oligarch that Bitsy hopes to get in league with.
- Brian Huskey as Doug, Paige's co-worker.
- Janelle James as Fran, another park ranger.
- Phil LaMarr as Randy, another park ranger.
- Tony Shalhoub as Marvin, Paige's boss.
- Fred Stoller as Leo Shallenhammer (season 1), a member of the City Council.
- Ed Asner as Ambrose Brandenham, Bitsy's older brother.
- Ester Dean as Hazel, Molly's friend and lab partner. In Molly's comic, her superhero counterpart is named "The Haze".
- Kerri Kenney-Silver as:
  - Lucy (season 2), a former maid whose employer left her everything in his will.
  - Dory Sterling (season 2), a hotel owner.
  - An unnamed member of the Park League (season 2).
- Marc Evan Jackson as Anton, Ambrose's butler.
- Stephanie Beatriz as Enrique, Cole's friend who shares his interest in the fantasy novel series The Squirrel Quarrels.
- Amber Ruffin as Shauna, a friend of Hazel's from her basketball team that Molly gets jealous of. In Molly's comic, her superhero/supervillain counterpart is named "Sha-Boom".

=== Guest ===
==== Introduced in season one ====
- Fred Armisen as
  - Esposito, a sanitation engineer manager.
  - Zoom Abromavich, a movie tour guide whose tours often involve obscure films or deleted scenes of films.
- Danny Burstein as Dick Flake, a fishing enthusiast.
- John Early as Augustus, Shampagne's dog therapist.
- Ron Funches as Danny, a boy who challenged Molly to chess.
- Christopher Jackson as Glorious Gary, a local skater in Central Park.
- Jessica Lowe as Anya, the wife of Zack and daughter of Dmitiry.
- Audra McDonald as Ashley, a likability consultant.
- Andrew Rannells as Griffin, another busker and the replacement narrator for the episode "Rival Busker" after Birdie previously gave away a spoiler to Paige.
- Robin Thede as Anita, an auditor that Bitsy hires to sabotage the park.
- Kelvin Yu as Sheng, another park ranger.

==== Introduced in season two ====
- Yvette Nicole Brown as Gina Tracker, the main character of the Tillermans' favorite police procedural.
- Thomas Lennon as Leslie Portergrave, the owner of a hotel in Brooklyn.
- Norm Lewis as Lionel, a bartender at the Brandenham hotel.
- Keith David as Ward Wittlinger, Owen's idol.
- Patti LuPone as Roberta McCullough, the owner of What's New, New York?, the newspaper where Paige works.
- Henry Winkler as Hank Zevansky, an insurance investigator.
  - Gavin Creel as Young Hank.
- Catherine O'Hara as Gwendolyn Swish, the heiress to Swish Tassels who knocked Bitsy off the Annual 50 Women Over 50 Worth Over 50 Million list.
- Jenifer Lewis as Celeste, Owen's mother.

== Episodes ==
=== Series overview ===
Season	Episodes		Originally released	
Season	Episodes		First released	Last released
1	10		May 29, 2020	July 24, 2020
2	16	8	June 25, 2021	July 30, 2021
2	16	8	March 4, 2022	April 8, 2022
3	13		September 9, 2022	November 18, 2022

=== Season 1 (2020) ===
No. overall	No. in season	Title	Directed by	Written by	Original release date	Prod. code
1	1	"Episode One"	Gavin Dell	Loren Bouchard, Nora Smith & Regina Hicks	May 29, 2020	1LBV01
Birdie, a busker, introduces the audience to Central Park ("Central in My Heart") as well as the Tillerman-Hunter family who live in Edendale Castle: Owen, the manager of the park, his wife Paige, a journalist, and their kids Molly and Cole. He introduces Bitsy Brandenham ("Heiress to a Fortune"), who owns Brandenham Hotel, which sits opposite the park. Her dog, Shampagne, has disappeared there due to the intentional mishandling by her assistant Helen. Everyone voices their wants: Owen wants to have some respect for himself and the park, Paige wants to get a big story, Molly wants a boy named Brendan to notice her, Cole, who has Shampagne, wants to care for him and Helen wants to own the Brandenham fortune ("Own It"). Bitsy offers a reward for the return of her dog, causing everyone to swarm the park and destroy Owen's prized turtleheads. Owen discovers Cole's crime, and he tries to get his dad to listen to him ("Poops I'll Pick Up"). They ultimately return the dog to an ungrateful Bitsy, saddening Cole incredibly ("Shampagne Was My Best Friend"). Paige reveals that she wrote an article on the Turtleheads' destruction, which mildly pleases Owen. Bitsy reveals her plan to buy up Central Park ("Central to My Plot").
2	2	"Skater's Circle"	Corey Barnes	Halsted Sullivan	May 29, 2020	1LBV02
Owen tries to get things right with the Central Park League, who is in charge of funding the park. He has to resolve an issue regarding the Skater's Circle, which has been left abandoned after he banned skating due to their constant littering. Birdie tries to have him resolve his conflict with skater Glorious Gary whom he does not respect. Wanting to feel heroic and inspired by the comics she draws, Molly decides to help Cole see Shampagne again ("Weirdos Make Great Superheroes"). Meanwhile, Bitsy tries to get several investors to agree with her plan to buy the park, which hides her unbridled rage at the world and those who looked down on her ("Make 'Em Pay"). Molly and Cole fail to rescue Shampagne but learn that he does remember Cole, much to their joy ("Weirdos Make Great Superheroes Reprise"). Paige has to report on a town meeting and discovers that the Central Park League is having a debate that could impact the park's funding. Bitsy decides to use this opportunity to enact her plan on eliminating Central Park for good. Paige tries calling Owen, but he is learning to skate with Gary and begins seeing the skaters' value while Birdie foreshadows his eventual discovery ("Do It While You Can").
3	3	"Hat Luncheon"	Ian Hamilton	Chuck Tatham	June 5, 2020	1LBV03
Birdie updates the audience ("Birdie Busking") and reveals that the upcoming Hat Luncheon between all the important people in Central Park is coming soon. Owen must give a speech while presenting the golden rake to a long time employee. Paige wants to know why the single Park League member, Leo Shallenhammer, voted against the park's funding and heads to the spa to interview him while bringing the kids along ("Momma's Got This"). She learns that Mayor Whitney Whitebottom influenced Leo's vote but does not know why and she resolves to ask him herself ("Momma's Got This Reprise"). Bitsy prepares for the luncheon and has the politicians and socialites turn on each other while Owen nervously tries to prepare for his speech ("Don't Think About the Failures"). Cole helps Molly talk to Brendan, who excitedly agrees to procure ice cream from the luncheon. The city officials and socialites get into a food fight ("The Park is Mine") while Brendan reveals that Bitsy is his great-aunt, and Paige receives an answer from the mayor who says that "we can do better" and escapes. Afterward, Molly kisses Brendan but gives him an allergic reaction as she had peanut ice cream. Owen's speech ends up being a success, mostly because everyone was tired of fighting.
4	4	"Garbage Ballet"	Gavin Dell	Monica Padrick	June 12, 2020	1LBV04
Birdie explains how Central Park's garbage collecting works ("Garbage Ballet"). However, due to Bitsy's interference, the Mayor has the collectors announce that they are at full capacity, filling up the park with trash. At home, Paige has suddenly become sick and begins to hallucinate rats everywhere. Worried that she will kill them, Cole feigns sickness, though later actually becomes ill, and tries to prevent any rat deaths ("Rats"). They eventually discover a family of rats in the basement and flee, though it is implied to be a hallucination. At school, the story of Molly's disastrous kiss with Brendan spreads, though her identity is safe, and her Fista-Puffs comics begin to reflect this ("I'm the Worst"). Her friend, Hazel, deduces her problem through her comics and tells her to forget about Brendan. She realizes that she has his phone, and they erase her numerous texts from it. Owen suddenly gets the idea to create a "trash train" and bring all the garbage to the collectors, where he discovers the deception. They eventually find a loophole with the help of a sympathetic trash manager Esposito ("Manager to Manager"). Bitsy challenges her employees to room 723 in her hotel, which is haunted. As she enters to disprove this to the maids, she supposedly senses her father.
5	5	"Dog Spray Afternoon"	Joel Moser	Annie Levine & Jonathan Emerson	June 19, 2020	1LBV05
Bitsy hires a tagger named Shart to deface Central Park. As Birdie tells the audience this, he explains how, as the narrator, he cannot inform the players of vital information ("Spoiler Alert"). Owen becomes unnerved at the graffiti, and Molly offers to come along with him in trying to out the perpetrator. Meanwhile, Bitsy has Helen take Shampagne out for a walk when they run into Cole. Helen allows him to walk Shampagne, angered by the attention that he gets from Bitsy ("If There's a Will"). Paige learns that someone is illegally buying up buildings for cheap but cannot figure out who. Birdie blurts out that Bitsy is behind the purchases, claiming that he overheard it from people in the park. Owen, Molly, and the park employees root out that Shart is trying to spell his name in the park ("Method to This Madness"). Thinking that Bitsy is signing her fortune to Shampagne instead of her, Helen tries to kill him ("If There's a Will Reprise") but is overcome with guilt and ironically saves the dog and Cole from traffic. Owen, Molly, Cole, and Paige work together and catch Shart in the act, angering Bitsy. Birdie grows concerned about spoiling information to Paige, which seems to be confirmed when a new narrator named Griffin introduces himself.
6	6	"Rival Busker"	Corey Barnes	Sanjay Shah	June 26, 2020	1LBV06
Griffin immediately takes over Birdie's job. He explains how narrators are not allowed to take part in the story, and thus, Birdie lost his narration privileges when he gave vital information to Paige ("First Class Hands"). The park has installed an owl cam for a nest that will go live at night. While Owen and Cole are excited, Paige wants to continue reporting on Bitsy and decides to stay at her hotel with Molly. Owen and Cole immediately become concerned for the baby owls and rush out to help them, only to get stuck in the tree. Dmitry, one of Bitsy's investors, needs to hold a wedding for his daughter Anya and demands a spot at the hotel. As everything is prepared, Anya disappears. Griffin once again warns Birdie of the dangers of getting close ("Too Close"). Anya does not want to marry her fiancé because of her father's mob connections, but Molly and Paige convince her to go through with it, with Anya confirming that Dmitry is in league with Bitsy ("Show Up"). Birdie ignores Griffin and rushes out to rescue Owen and Cole, declaring that narrators should also be guardian angels. To Griffin's shock, this works, and Birdie is reinstated as narrator.
7	7	"Squirrel, Interrupted"	Mario D'Anna	Jeff Drake	July 3, 2020	1LBV07
Cole celebrates that tomorrow will be the "Sqavenger" Hunt in Central Park based on his favorite book series The Squirrel Quarrels ("Nuts Nuts Nuts"). Owen agrees to take Cole to the event while Paige spends some mother-daughter time with Molly over chess. Molly turns out to be good at it, and Paige decides to have her play with the pros. Owen, Cole, and Cole's friend Enrique go on the scavenger hunt, but Owen has trouble understanding the book series. Meanwhile, Bitsy attends her family reunion, where she openly despises them ("Big Deal"). She tells them her plan to buy Central Park. Paige voices her excitement at having Molly be a chess player while Owen feels terrible for messing up his relationship with his son ("Can We Do Today Again?"). Molly ends up losing to a professional player, which makes Paige worry that Molly will not like chess anymore ("Can We Do Today Again? (Reprise)"). However, Molly is okay with losing. Owen decides to double down his efforts and helps Cole and Enrique win the scavenger hunt, eventually having dinner with the author.
8	8	"Hot Oven"	Corey Barnes	Rachel Hastings	July 10, 2020	1LBV08
Molly and Brendan have resumed their relationship and privately voice their love for one another as they text each other ("I'm in a Perfect Relationship"). Still, when Cole suggests they invite him over for dinner, she is reluctant, especially since Paige cannot stop asking questions and Owen's pizzas notoriously fail. Meanwhile, Shampagne pees on Bitsy's bed, and she calls dog expert Augustus to help out. He informs Helen that if Shampagne begins biting, he is a TOSGANO (this one sucks get a new one), and Helen hatches a scheme to get Shampagne removed ("TOSGANO"), only for it to once again fail. Bitsy puts a letter out about how Central Park is a dump, offending Owen and Paige. As Molly brings Brendan over, she discovers that he is a Brandenham and struggles to keep this a secret from her parents. Owen rushes out with Birdie to perfect the pizza, and despite dropping it on the floor when he gets home, everyone discovers that it tastes good. Paige gets Brendan to reveal his namesake, and he, in turn, reveals Bitsy's plan to buy the park. Despite this, Owen and Paige are unfazed by Molly's relationship with Brendan and are glad about how things turned out ("Imperfectly Perfect"). Molly and Brendan make multiple attempts to kiss, with each shot ending poorly.
9	9	"Live It Up Tonight"	Mario D'Anna	Syreeta Singleton	July 17, 2020	1LBV09
As Bitsy prepares for her award ceremony ("Live It Up Tonight"), she has Mayor Whitebottom hire an auditor to dig up dirt to get Owen fired. Cole and Molly want to attend a pop-culture tour for Home Alone 2: Lost in New York. Owen and Paige decide to let the two go on their own, while they have a date night. While Cole and Molly join the tour ("Zoom's Home Alone 2 Deleted Scenes Tour"), Owen and Paige cease their date night when the auditor notices a misplaced receipt, forcing them to find it. Cole gets scared from the tour by bats ("Rated Hard PG, for Spookiness"), just as it begins to rain, frustrating the Tillerman-Hunters ("I Did Not Account for This"). Owen and Paige find the receipt, and Molly retrieves Cole. Meanwhile, Bitsy and Helen accidentally get locked in a wine cellar, which they believe is from a rival hotel, and destroy the stock. They make it to the award ceremony with Bitsy, upset that Owen was not fired and that the stock was theirs. Owen and Paige enjoy cleaning the bathroom together ("Live It Up Tonight (End Credits)"). Note: This episode is dedicated to the memory of Nick Cordero, a Broadway actor who died due to COVID-19 complications.
10	10	"A Fish Called Snakehead"	Corey Barnes	Mark Alton Brown	July 24, 2020	1LBV11
Owen is informed about a snakehead possibly living in the Harlem Meer which could damage the ecosystem ("Hell-Fish"). The rest of the family decide to join him to get some firsthand experience. Meanwhile, Bitsy learns that she is unlikeable, and the mayor hires a likability professional ("New York Doesn't Like Your Face"). Soon, the snakehead's story becomes a media sensation, and Bitsy decides to take advantage of it by hiring a fishing expert named Dick Flake ("Dick Flake"). Bitsy's likability becomes tied to Dick's ability to catch the fish. Dick catches the fish, but Paige notices that the fish already seemed dead and deduces that Dick bought it from the store. Owen feels like giving up, but his family encourages him to fight for the park. They head out together, and Owen successfully catches the snakehead. Paige breaks the story and humiliates Bitsy. Bitsy vows to continue her campaign against the park while the Tillerman-Hunter family rest easy, knowing that they can pull together to protect the park from people like Bitsy ("Die Trying").

=== Season 2 (2021–22) ===
No. overall	No. in season	Title	Directed by	Written by	Original release date	Prod. code
Part 1
11	1	"Central Dark"	Mario D'Anna	Dan Hernandez & Benji Samit	June 25, 2021	2LBV01
Birdie and the Tillerman-Hunter family reintroduce themselves ("Middle of it All"). Meanwhile, Bitsy and Helen are in Weehawken, Helen's hometown, for an event ("Weehawken"). They arrive at the event where Bitsy speaks to the other hotel owners and reveals that she has the future plans for cheap real estate. Molly reveals that she is going to a concert with Brendan. There is a major tri-state blackout and everyone is affected ("Come into the Darkness"). The family plays a Salem Witch hunt board game where they begin to suspect one another, especially when Cole reveals that Molly lied about it being double date with juvenile delinquents. Bitsy's rivals chase her and Helen, but Helen uses her knowledge to get them home during the blackout ("W(h)ich Way"). The Tillerman-Hunters realize that none of them were the witch as the witch card got lost during the blackout. Molly apologizes, and Owen and Paige allow her to go to the concert ("In the Dark").
12	2	"Mother's Daze"	Tom King	Chuck Tatham	June 25, 2021	2LBV02
It's Mother's Day and Owen, Molly, and Cole are setting up for Paige ("All About You"). Cole realizes that the pearls he bought are cheap, and Molly realizes that her gift, a scarf, is not special. They desperately try to find a new gift. Owen and Paige have a walk in the park, but Paige spots a mysterious "unsanctioned plaque" which reads like a clue and leads Owen on a scavenger hunt. Meanwhile, Helen has her day off, and Bitsy becomes sober, frightening her. She asks the bartender, Lionel, for her drink ("Pour Poor Me More Please"), but he quits when he is denied service tenders. Helen has a day off at a spa, but discovers that she cannot stand relaxing and returns to the Brandenham ("This is It"/"This is It Reprise"). She forces Bitsy to apologize, and Lionel gets what he asked for. Paige finds the last clue at the park bench where she discovered she was pregnant with Molly and learns that the scavenger hunt was set up by Owen and the kids. The kids give her their homemade gifts. She has them promise that no matter how old they get, she will always be a part of their lives ("Promise").
13	3	"Fista Puffs Mets Out Justice"	Mario D'Anna	Chuck Tatham	June 25, 2021	1LBV13
In Molly's comic book world, Fista Puffs is trying to stop a monster at the museum ("The Fistapuffs Theme Song"); however, it is a simulation and she is unable to resolve it. Her fellow heroes, Haze and Sha-Boom, are training her to join their team, the Pow Pow Boom Booms ("Pow Pow Boom Booms"), but Fista Puffs realizes that Sha-Boom is evil. Molly, still in comic book form, is called to dinner where her family seems very compliant and tells her to forget her problems ("No One's Home"). Molly realizes that this is wrong and gets called down to dinner for real. Molly reveals that at the museum that day, her friend Hazel began talking to Shauna and was laughing at her jokes. She felt uncomfortable and started making flat jokes. Molly returns to the compliant family in her comic, but they turn on her for hiding her problems ("Trying Too Hard"). Haze and Sha-Boom are back to being Fista Puffs' friends, while, in the real world, Molly is now hanging out with both Hazel and Shauna ("Pow Pow Boom Booms Reprise"). Note: Birdie, Bitsy, and Helen do not appear in this episode.
14	4	"Of Course You Realize This Means Ward"	Matt Garafolo	Jeff Drake	July 2, 2021	2LBV03
Owen is nervous because the speaker for the Central Park field trip had to cancel. Owen refuses to be a speaker himself and recalls getting inspired by another park manager named Ward Whitlinger ("The Answer is Ward"). Paige uses her journalism skills to find Ward so he can speak. Molly and Cole see Brendan for his indoor kite flying competition and try to spice up his performance ("Kite String"). Meanwhile, Bitsy has Helen type her memoir, but she discovers that her brother Ambrose is typing one too. They race to the publisher, who says they are both terrible but that Bitsy's is "slightly" better. Brendan gets overwhelmed with their help, and Molly apologizes as he goes and performs. Ward arrives at the park, but he has lost faith in the earth and gives a cynical speech. Owen, Birdie, and Elwood give an uplifting speech about saving the planet ("Why Bother"). Ward is impressed with Owen's determination and leaves on good terms with him ("Why Bother (End Credits)"). Note: This episode credits an extra song called "Just Type" (Patrick Dacey, Tim Dacey and Jeff Drake) which is not featured in the episode, nor listed on the episode soundtrack.
15	5	"Down to the Underwire"	Mario D'Anna	Meredith Dawson	July 9, 2021	2LBV05
Molly tells her family that she needs a new bra ("I Have a Bra-blem"), but Paige has to go to work, so Owen goes in her stead. Helen finds a key to Bitsy's records ("Little Key"). Helen takes Shampagne to the park but loses the key. She enlists Cole, Enrique and Elwood to help search for it ("Keep It Low Key"). Owen is overwhelmed by the abundance of bras, so they enlist the help of a kind, dutiful employee. Bitsy shows up at the paper to meet with the owner Roberta McCullough. To make up for a childhood footrace that Bitsy cheated on, they have footrace around the office ("Down to the Wire"). Roberta wins and demands the ribbon. Cole finds the key and claims that Shampagne ate and pooped it out to divert Bitsy's suspicion. Cole decides to stop obsessing over Shampagne and enjoy his youth, and Molly thanks Owen for his help with finding a new bra for her ("Bra-blem Solved/Keep It Low Key (End Credits)").
16	6	"The Shadow"	Mario D'Anna	Dan Hernandez & Benji Samit	July 16, 2021	1LBV12
With the Tillerman-Hunters not doing anything special today, Birdie tells the audience about a moment in Bitsy's past relating to a famous hotel thief called the Shadow ("The Shadow"). The supposed thief strikes again at the Brandenham Hotel. Bitsy is put off when former officer turned insurance claimer, Hank Zevansky, comes in to solve the case. Bitsy confesses to being the Shadow in her youth due to her parents lack of care for her ("That Was All Me"). Hank admits that he knew it was her and had a brief encounter with her in the past ("A Moment Forever Ago"). Satisfied, Hank leaves Bitsy who was glad to be noticed. In an instrumental segment ("A Thing On Strings (A Busker's Serenade)"), Birdie interacts with an elderly woman and nurse. The woman dies, but Birdie is comforted by the nurse and later by a little boy who dances to his music as he quietly returns to busking ("A Moment Forever Ago (End Credits)"). Note: "A Thing On Strings (A Busker's Serenade)" is listed as "Sungrai's Song (Birdie Short)" in the end credits.
17	7	"A Decent Proposal"	Tom King	Ava Tramer	July 23, 2021	2LBV06
Molly is getting ready to go to Bitsy's birthday party with Brendan ("Will I Fit"). Owen fishes a bottle that holds a proposal from the lake, and he and Paige find the couple. Owen resolves to fix his own proposal. As Bitsy minces her guests ("My Worst Day"), Molly begins to feel out of place ("Will I Fit Reprise"). She runs into Bitsy who takes an interest in her crude drawings of the guests. Helen takes Shampagne to the park where Cole plays with him until the dog becomes enamored with a Great Dane named Kingston ("Puppy Love"). With Helen's help, the dogs get together, and she smiles for once. Owen becomes obsessed with fixing the proposal and breaks down his terrible proposal to his employees ("How It Happened"). Paige realizes that he was mostly disappointed in himself and tells him that it was okay. Afterwards, Molly, Cole, and Paige set up a new proposal in the living room for Owen who happily accepts ("How It Happened Reprise/Puppy Love (End Credits)")
18	8	"Sir Bricks-A-Lot"	Mario D'Anna	Mnelik Belilgne	July 30, 2021	1LBV10
Birdie explains that the Tillerman-Hunters have had a rough week until Owen was offered a job at Kingsley University in Connecticut. As he considers the offer, the family creates their own ideal future should Owen take the job. Molly imagines that she would be a janitor at the University with dreams of being an artist ("Paint the World"). Paige decides to be a successful fiction author ("A Different Paige"), but gets captured by an obsessive fan named Margarett (who resembles Bitsy). Cole takes a spaceship where he befriends an alien, but must return him before the government takes him. Owen reveals that he wants to create the perfect park at Kingsley ("Follow Through"), but realizes that no matter where he goes similar problems are always going to follow him. To his surprise, the rest of the family is happy as they all realize that they cannot leave their favorite things behind ("A Different Paige End Credit"). Note: Bitsy and Helen do not appear in this episode, but a character resembling Bitsy named Margarett appears in Paige's story and a government agent resembling Helen appears in Cole's story.
Part 2
19	9	"A Boat-iful Mind"	Steven Theis	Rachel Hastings	March 4, 2022	2LBV07
Cole, who has never failed at anything, discovers that he is bad at geometry ("I'm Bad (At Being Bad)"). Owen convinces Paige that they need a new stepladder while Molly is disappointed that her drawing of a farting bean is being published in the school paper. Cole goes to the park, runs into Glorious Gary, and takes up an interest in model boat sailing ("Smooth Sailing"). Cole becomes obsessed and disregards his geometry homework. Things are made much worse when he bails on a test for a model boat sailing competition. Meanwhile, Bitsy and Helen get gout and resort to taking drugs "from Canada" and get high ("Highest Suite in the Hotel"). Cole is punished for skipping school, but Paige points out that he used geometry to win the race. As he perfects his geometry knowledge, Owen and Paige enjoy their new stepladder, and Molly publishes a better comic to print ("From a New Angle"). Cole still has to do more chores as punishment for skipping school ("I'm Bad (At Being Bad) End Credits").
20	10	"Bee Is for Brandenham"	Tom King	Bennett Walsh	March 4, 2022	2LBV04
Owen has a headache which he believes is from getting the wrong prescription glasses. His family tells him to let his employees take care of the park, but he refuses and would rather micromanage ("Ideally I'd Deal with It"). Bitsy tries to convince a shoe mogul to hold his convention at her hotel when bees suddenly infest the building, forcing her to call Owen. Owen gets an eye exam and is forced to wear sunglasses, essentially rendering him blind. Paige, Molly and Cole go to Marvin's house to take care of his cat Sir Peter, only for him to get stuck behind a wall. Helen enjoys the shoes that the mogul gave her ("It Stings"). Owen refuses to have his employees cut a branch without his supervision and brings them to help deal with the bee infestation. When it becomes apparent that Owen does not know what he is doing, Elwood takes over and removes the bees while Paige finally listens to Marvin's instructions on how to get Sir Peter out of the wall ("Flyin' High"). Owen finally allows the employees to handle the park without him ("It Stings (End Credits)").
21	11	"The PAIGE-riarchy!"	Ian Hamilton	Lindsey Stoddart	March 4, 2022	2LBV08
Birdie comments on how nature is beautiful and gross ("Awfully Beautiful"), when Molly suddenly gets her first period. Paige tries to calm her nerves. Afterwards, Paige tries to make Molly feel better ("Rockin' on the Rag") before deciding to throw a "period party" for her. Meanwhile, Bitsy learns that she has been knocked off the "50 over 50 over 50" list and plans to kick out Gwendolyn Swish, her rival, by throwing a phony charity drive for fennec foxes. Bitsy is urged on by Swish to double the money accrued ("Light the Match"), only to learn that she knew her plan all along and lowered Bitsy's value. Molly and Hazel arrive at the period party and are horrified by the menstruation imagery when Brendan arrives, scaring Molly away. Paige reveals that she had a terrible first period herself and wanted her to avoid that same mistake ("Why Me Waikiki"). Molly and Paige make up and return to the party where they end up enjoying the festivities ("Awfully Beautiful (End Credits)").
22	12	"Castle Sweet Castle"	Tom King	Andrew Mueth	March 11, 2022	2LBV09
Owen and Paige want to move the washing machine upstairs, only to realize that they had planned to do so when they first moved into their castle home ("Maybe Potentially Great"). They need to get approval and meet Iggy, a house developer, who is obsessed with the castle's history and makes lavish suggestions ("Restoration"). Meanwhile, Bitsy's Rolls-Royce finally breaks down. Bitsy has an emotional attachment to it and manages to negotiate a new Rolls-Royce based on her father's teachings. Molly and Cole find Owen's guitar and try to get Elwood to teach them, making Birdie jealous. They quickly lose interest when Birdie and Elwood realize they are in sync ("You Are the Music"). With the washing machine finally moved, Molly and Cole invite Owen and Paige to listen to the song that they learned ("You Are the Music (End Credits)").
23	13	"Celeste We Forget"	Steven Theis	Janelle James	March 18, 2022	2LBV10
Owen wakes the family up so that they can go see the corpse flower which blooms once every seven years ("Big Stink"). However, Owen's mother Celeste, who has a habit of getting distracted, joins them on their trip. Meanwhile, Paige attends a beauty convention where she tries out different beauty samples ("A Few Minutes for Magic"), before seeing Bitsy with Helen. She tries to coerce Helen into giving her Bitsy's phone records in order to link her to the mayor, but Helen refuses. Celeste continues to pause for distractions. After getting Owen to play Double Dutch ("Turtle Babies"), and Owen finally breaks down his need for planning ("Havin' a Plan"). They miss the line, disappointing Owen ("Today Stinks (Reprise)"), but Celeste manages to charm the security guard into letting them in. Paige returns home to a tired Owen, Molly and Cole and is surprised by the putrid smell they picked up from the corpse flower ("Turtle Babies (End Credits)").
24	14	"The Ballad of Johnnie Lee"	Mario D'Anna	Lindsey Stoddart	March 25, 2022	2LBV11
Cole is upset because his pants and underwear fell at school in the student filled auditorium ("I Mooned the Whole School"). He decides to change his name to Johnnie Lee Tillerman after his grandfather. The family disagrees, and Owen begins a story about a robin hood-esque cowboy in the future named Johnnie Lee ("The Name is Johnnie Lee"). Molly offers her own story where Johnnie Lee is a successful stunt man ("Ode to Johnnie Lee"). A stunt goes terribly wrong because he refused to give up his real name of Cole, but he once again refuses to change his mind. Paige finally tells the story of her father who was a water boy and ruined a big game, but rather than let the moment define him, he went back and met his future wife ("When the Bottom Falls Out"). Realizing that running away from his true name will not solve anything, Cole decides to return to school. To his surprise, none of the students, especially his friend Enrique, care and things resume to normal. Owen and Paige congratulate themselves ("The Name is Johnnie Lee (End Credits)").
25	15	"Where There's Smoke"	Steven Theis	Ava Tramer	April 1, 2022	2LBV12
Bitsy's latest scheme involves getting legitimate funding from investors ("Clean Money"). Meanwhile, the Tillermans attend a wake to Mayor Whitebottom's former aide, and Paige believes that she is close to proving his corruption ("Onto Something"). Molly and Cole get trapped in a hidden room, but are rescued by Paige and Owen who find a list of wire transfers to the mayor. Bitsy tries to get funding from a Swiss artist named Ernst who is clearly more interested in Helen. Helen tries to convince him to fund the park ("I Love How Sad You Make Me") but accidentally reveals Bitsy's insecurities and reason for buying the park to Ernst. When Ernst calls Bitsy sad, Helen stands up for her and convinces him to fund the park. The mayor catches the Tillermans and threatens to ruin Owen's career if they do not give him the notes. They refuse and the Mayor tries to get them back but is outwitted ("Gotta Grab It"). The Tillermans return home confident, unaware that Bitsy's plan is coming to fruition, while Birdie admits that he does not know what happens next ("Clean Money (End Credits)").
26	16	"The Lyin' in Winter"	Mario D'Anna	Story by : Josh Gad; Teleplay by : Dan Hernandez & Benji Samit	April 8, 2022	2LBV13
Birdie loses his violin and his memories ("Up to Here"). After Paige publishes her exposé on Mayor Whitebottom, he suddenly announces his resignation and implies that he plans to sell the park to Bitsy. Bitsy and Helen crash their car in the snow, and Helen and Shampagne end up at the Tillerman house. Owen goes out to get Bitsy from the snow where the two argue over their opinion on the park ("Time to Close"). Helen reveals information on the sale to Paige. Just as Bitsy and Owen arrive, Paige reveals that the sale is actually to Ambrose, Bitsy's brother, who will also own the Brandenham Hotel. Owen realizes that the hotel is Bitsy's "heart" and feels empathy for her for the first time ("Own It (Reprise)"). After Paige threatens to expose more of his wrongdoings, Mayor Whitebottom cancels the sale. Bitsy still intends to buy the park someday, and Helen admits to Paige that she helped on purpose. Birdie finds his violin after his memories are restored, and everyone sings together in the now rescued park ("A Walk in the Park"). Note: This episode features a posthumous appearance by Ed Asner as Ambrose, recorded before his death.

=== Season 3 (2022) ===
No. overall	No. in season	Title	Directed by	Written by	Original release date	Prod. code
27	1	"A Star Is Owen"	Tom King	Nick Adams	September 9, 2022	3LBV01
Winter ends and Spring appears, much to everyone, sans Bitsy's, delight ("Room to Grow"). Owen has been trying to get a meeting with the interim Mayor Quincy, but he seems busy. Luckily, Owen secured a television network to film the Tillermans' favorite show Gina Tracker, FBI at the park. At first, he is excited as he believes that everyone on television will see the beauty of the park, but the director, Nathan, begins to alter the scenery with trash and misplaced flora, much to Owen's horror. Meanwhile, Bitsy and Helen plan to hire an up and coming candidate to be their new puppet, but cannot decide on a suitable person ("Person to Worsen"). Owen has finally had enough and explains his issues to Nathan and a visiting Quincy ("Plant that Seed"). He is ignored and kicked off the set. However, Quincy appears genuinely interested in what Owen has to say and agrees to help fund a campaign for the park. Bitsy and Helen realize too late that Quincy would be perfect as their puppet, but decide to have a meeting with him anyway. The Tillermans finally sit down to see the new Gina Tracker episode and discover that Owen's part was recast ("Person to Worsen (End Credits)").
28	2	"Paige's Next Chapter"	Steven Theis	Lindsey Stoddart	September 9, 2022	3LBV02
The Tillermans are preparing for the arrival of Paige's sister Abby who has decided to move to New York City to become an actress. Paige also has a meeting with a publishing company so that she can write a book ("All Lining Up"). Molly and Cole get into a culinary war with each other so that they can make the best dessert for Abby ("Hit the Sweet Spot"). Both their creations come out bad, but they resolve it by combining them into one creation. Meanwhile, Bitsy's piano player for a gathering has broken his arm and he offers that his wife fill in for him. However, his wife is a scat singer that annoys Bitsy and Helen. Despite this, the gathering turns out to be a success. Abby goes to a man named Lester to get headshots, but Paige believes that he is a predator. He admits that he actually does photos for animals and that Abby is his first human client. Realizing that Paige is missing her meeting with the publisher, Abby overcomes her fear of the subway to get her to her meeting on time ("One Foot in the Door"). Paige has a successful meeting and invites Abby who is happy with Molly and Cole's creation despite the fact that it is barely edible for anyone ("Hit the Sweet Spot (End Credit)").
29	3	"Ice Ice Not Baby"	Brian Kaufman	Ava Tramer	September 9, 2022	3LBV03
Molly and Brendan are enjoying themselves at the ice rink ("Ten Out of Ten") when their friends show up. Brendan suddenly becomes very tense with Molly and the two get into an argument. Meanwhile, Abby auditioned for a commercial and, with the help of the Tillermans, tries to learn to eat and smile at the same time. She finally succeeds, but learns that her role has been given to a parrot. At the Brandenham, Bitsy prepares for the arrival of Quincy in an effort to try and get him to work under her and feigns being a benevolent boss. When she mentions the laundry room, Quincy becomes ecstatic and voices of his love of doing the laundry ("The Wash and Dry for Me"). She convinces him that she is interested in helping out with the Central Park campaign that he and Owen are doing and he accepts her offer. Molly learns that Brendan was going to give a set of markers for her drawings and was being tense because he did not know what a tortillon was. She forgives him and the two make up over ice skating with the help of Birdie who, throughout the episode, was fighting with the title cards that kept popping up, but ultimately makes up with ("Love Worth Fighting For" / "The Wash and Dry for Me (End Credits)").
30	4	"A Triptych Down Memory Lane"	Mario D'Anna	Meredith Dawson	September 16, 2022	3LBV05
Owen and Paige are hard at work trying to finish up their projects. While Paige goes out to help Abby get a couch, Owen is at home with Molly and Cole who are arguing over which cable package to get as they try to fix their connection. Owen has been using the family hard drive to save his work, but left it at the office where Elwood has been using it. He forgets the password and only has a limited amount of tries to open it, otherwise the hard drive will erase itself. To jog Elwood's memory, Cole tells a soothing story that is actually just a retelling of Homeward Bound ("A Song to Sing"). This fails and Molly decides to tell a scary story that is a retelling of Black Swan ("Bad Bad Bird"). Owen has him try to recall sights, sounds and smells when Paige comes home and they tell her what happened. As they panic, Owen tells the family that even though some of their important memories are on the hard drive, they still have their real memories to remind them of the good times ("Backing Up"). Elwood suddenly remembers that the password was "cool hat" and gets in. The cable person shows up, but informs Molly and Cole that the package deal expired, forcing them to just have their internet fixed ("Backing Up (End Credit)").
31	5	"Golden Owen: Manager Damager"	Steven Theis	Halsted Sullivan	September 23, 2022	3LBV04
Owen is excited that he will reunite with his three friends, Gannon, Alonzo and Ned, at the annual park managers committee and hopes that they will sign for the "I Heart the Park" campaign ("Four Park Harmony"). Upon arriving with Paige, Owen overhears his friends mocking him for his obsession with the park, which Paige admits is plainly obvious. She helps him with reconnecting with them by feeding them information on them. Meanwhile, Bitsy and Helen struggle with an ultra shiny and slippery floor due to Bitsy having fired and rehired the man. Elsewhere, Abby goes job hunting with Molly and Cole and tries and fails to show her skills ("My Many Talents"). Owen meets with his friends at a bar and admits to fabricating his interest in their hobbies, but claims that working at Central Park is hard ("Working Song"). He attempts to ride a mechanical bull so that they can sign his campaign, but falls off the bull almost immediately. Nevertheless, Gannon, Alonzo and Ned agree to see it after seeing that Owen is still committed to their friendship. Abby ends up getting hired at the Brandenham Hotel after showing off her skill in memorizing people's drinks ("Working Song (End Credit)").
32	6	"A Matter of Life and Boeuf"	Tom King	Francisco Angones	September 30, 2022	3LBV06
Abby makes breakfast for Owen and Paige so as to tell them that she got a job at the Brandenham and invites them to dine there for dinner, while Bitsy hires a chef to make a cote de boeuf to be served that evening ("A Positive Light"). Everyone arrives as well as Bitsy's brother Ambrose, his assistant Anton and fiancé Kendra. As the chef is about to prepare the boeuf, Anton states that Ambrose has to have the steak liquified for him. A fight breaks out and the steak disappears. Bitsy immediately blames Abby, but Paige quickly proves her innocence. Soon, everyone begins to accuse one another of stealing the boeuf ("A Real Whodunnit"). Helen figures out that Champagne ate the boeuf and the chef confirms it, but reveals that a steak sauce was added that would have killed Ambrose. Everyone believes Bitsy added the sauce, but Abby thinks otherwise ("Little Good"). They realize that Anton tried to switch the steak, so he could sell it while Kendra added the sauce so that Bitsy would be blamed for killing Ambrose (the two of them were lovers this whole time). Bitsy reluctantly thanks Abby for helping her out while Paige tells her that she is okay with her keeping her job at the Brandenham ("A Positive Light (End Credit)"). Note: This episode is dedicated to Ed Asner, who makes another and final posthumous appearance as Ambrose, recorded before his death.
33	7	"Slumber-Dog-Molly-an-Aire"	Brian Kaufman	Jeff Drake	October 7, 2022	3LBV07
Molly is holding a slumber party with her friends Shauna and Hazel ("Me and the Girls"), while Cole and Enrique offer to be concierges. Paige is noticeably concerned with how Molly is growing up, but promises not to interfere with her party as she and Owen will watch a movie instead. Meanwhile, Bitsy has a nightmare and at Abby's suggestion they decide to move the bed with her in it. She complains and Abby suggests talking about her dream which involves Mooney the handyman. He arrives and fixes the bed leg, before Helen fires him to please Bitsy. Shauna and Hazel reveal that they plan to sneak out so that they can meet some boys and Molly reluctantly goes with them while ordering Cole and Enrique to cover for them ("We Have Fun"). It begins to rain and the girls decide to head back. However, Paige discovers the deception too late and gets stuck on the bridge where she is rescued by the boys. Despite Molly doing the right thing, Paige insists on grounding her for lying about sneaking out. Molly and Paige finally have a one on one talk with each other with Paige accepting that Molly can take care of herself and Molly knowing that Paige will always be there for her ("One Step At a Time" / "Me and the Girls (End Credit)").
34	8	"Lunar Palaver"	Mario D'Anna	Nick Adams	October 14, 2022	3LBV08
Cole gets up to do LARPing with his friend ("Saturday Means Adventure"), when he is suddenly hassled by a white woman who claims that he was attacking her. Owen manages to quell the situation, but thinks the incident was motivated by racism ("Black Boy Joy"). Cole, having moved on from the incident wants to attend a nighttime gathering in the park, but Owen, Paige and Molly are still focused on the perceived racism. Meanwhile, Bitsy becomes suspicious when Helen has something to do outside and work and follows her. She sees her on a date with another man who wants to take Helen away ("Everything But You"). Bitsy pays the man to leave Helen alone, but discovers too late that Helen had already broken up with him. Owen finally sits down with Cole to explain what happened and tells him about African-American history. Cole is slightly bothered, but is comforted by his dad and decides that he will change his outfit from a dark hooded dagger user to a brightly clothed magic user who carries dust on him. Cole thanks Owen for the talk as he goes and enjoys the night's festivities ("Saturday Means Adventure (End Credit)").
35	9	"A Killer Deadline"	Tom King	Lindsey Stoddart	October 21, 2022	3LBV09
While Owen prepares to go to school with Molly and Cole, Paige is frustratingly trying to finish her article and first three chapters of her book ("Tick Tock"). At school, it is kickball day and Molly decides to do study hall instead until Owen reveals that he is a kickball champion ("Flick of the Wrist"). When Molly fails to pick up on Owen's teachings she quits, but a conversation with Carol the librarian convinces her to return and she succeeds this time. At the Brandenham, Bitsy is called a "granny" causing her to have a panic attack. Abby convinces Helen to let her try and cheer her up in exchange for having Wednesdays off to take an accents class. After several failed attempts, Abby has the teacher of said class come in and compliment Bitsy, restoring her to her old self. Paige is visited by her boss, Marvin, who suggests that she check into a hotel so she can think better. Paige ends up in the middle of a conspiracy with criminals and tries to escape just as Molly and Abby's problems get resolved ("I Got the Goods"). Marvin is revealed to be behind the criminal's activities, but it is quickly revealed that Paige's adventure was part of her book which she was writing ("I Got the Goods (End Credit)").
36	10	"Money Candy"	Steven Theis	Ava Tramer	October 28, 2022	3LBV10
Molly and Cole are into the latest K-pop sensation Money Candy ("I Will Find You"). Owen and Paige want to be hero parents and decide to go buy tickets for them and later Abby when she comes to visit. They learn that they are much too late to buy them, but Abby learns that her roommate is friends with one of the members who informs them that they are in New York right now and they go searching for them with no luck. Meanwhile, Bitsy decides that she wants Shampagne to be cloned, much to Helen's irritation and while at the clinic she tries to talk her out of it ("Can't Clone Shampagne"). Bitsy ultimately changes her mind, but claims that it was because she did not want a dog that was from Brooklyn. While Molly, Cole and Abby get distracted by decoy Money Candy, Owen and Paige discover that Money Candy broke into their house to use their bathroom due to the park's being clogged. They help them escape Central Park and in return they are given five VIP tickets. Owen and Paige reveal how they got the tickets ("Money Candy Peed In Our Bathroom"), but Molly, Cole and Abby do not believe them. Nevertheless, they are gratefully happy that they managed to get them to begin with and head to the concert together ("I Will Find You (End Credit)").
37	11	"The Puffs Go Poof"	Brian Kaufman	Meredith Dawson	November 4, 2022	3LBV11
Molly is once again doodling a Fist-Puffs comic ("The Fista Puffs Theme Song"), when her character has to go through a nightly ritual of redoing her hair every battle ("Fista Puffs Kick Butt"). Her assistant, Morgan Freewoman, offers a solution to straighten her hair, but in the process she will lose her powers. Fista-Puffs takes it and enjoys her new look, but a villain by the name of Splash appears. She avoids getting her hair wet and goes to a scientist she rescued earlier to re-puff her hair, accepting herself for who she is. Meanwhile, Bitsy accidentally looks herself up on the internet and hires a trio of content creators to help rebrand her image ("Re-Brandenham"). After failing to see any change, she simply decides to buy the websites that feature her. At home, Owen, Paige and Cole are sorting their clothes and choosing ones to toss out, but ultimately decide to keep them all. The Tillerman-Hunters and Bitsy all voice how they have come to accept themselves for who they are ("Perfect Fit"). Molly tells Paige that she was nervous going swimming with her friends because they wanted to go to a movie later, but she worked it out with them, only to learn that her swimsuit was tossed out ("Re-Brandenham (End Credit)").
38	12	"A Hot Dog to Remember"	Mario D'Anna	Halsted Sullivan	November 11, 2022	3LBV13
A hot dog vendor named Louie is a staple of the park, having worked there for years ("Louie's Life"). Louie is one day away to getting his name written in a ledger, but cannot make it as he has to attend his daughter's graduation. Owen decides to get his hot dog cart to the park during dinner rush for him and brings Cole along to teach his responsibility after he asks for a turtle ("Doin' It For Louie"), but end up running into several problems during their trip back to the park. Meanwhile, Paige is trying to prove to her editor that the ending of her book is plausible and tries to prove it by having Molly and her friends ride a roller coaster ("Higher and Higher"). They are too distracted, forcing Paige to ride the coaster herself. Despite disproving her publisher, she decides to change the ending anyway. Bitsy tries to get a "Mapsie" car to get a proper image of her for their website after the car captured an image of her in a humiliating pose. She tries again, but makes another bad image. Owen and Cole get Gary and several other people to come and help push the cart back just in time for Louie to return from graduation ("He Touched Us (With His Hot Dogs)"). Cole tells Owen he does not want a turtle anymore ("Doin' It For Louie (End Credit)").
39	13	"The Brandenpire Strikes Back"	Tom King	Francisco Angones	November 18, 2022	3LBV12
Owen is stressed by the commissioner coming for the campaign; Abby has been waiting for a callback for three weeks; and Bitsy's workers are now going on strike ("What Do We Want?"). Bitsy sends Abby out to deliver a heavy chandelier and is constantly getting calls from her on updates as she waits for a response from the casting agent. Elwood tries to help Owen calm down ("Small Stuff"), but ends up stressing him more when he reveals that he lost park totes they were supposed to sell. Abby gets a callback, but overhears that they are going to go with someone else. She finally blows up at Bitsy and quits ("Enough is Enough"), only for her to be spotted by the casting director who hires her. Bitsy is finally forced to give an apology to her workers, but they want her to apologize to Helen. She refuses and instead gives everyone a raise and extra hours off. This turns out to have been part of Helen's plan, telling a worker that she is the real boss. The Commissioner arrives and tells Owen that he is a good park manager because she barely ever has to come down there and he takes everyone else's stress. Owen is finally relieved as everyone celebrates over their successes ("Love Comes Back Around").

== Production ==
=== Development ===
Central Park was developed by 20th Television and was initially eyed for the Fox Broadcasting Company, which had been looking to create more animated series. The Walt Disney Company subsequently announced its intention to acquire 21st Century Fox, the parent of 20th Century Fox Television, excluding the Fox broadcasting network. After the Fox network decided to pass on Central Park, 20th Century Fox Television, which was about to change ownership, began shopping the project, sparking a heated bidding war among Apple, Netflix, and Hulu. On March 12, 2018, Apple announced it had given the production a two-season straight-to-series order consisting of twenty-six episodes in total. The series was created by Loren Bouchard, Nora Smith, and Josh Gad. Executive producers for the series include Bouchard and Gad with Kevin Larsen serving as producer. Production companies involved with the production include Bento Box Entertainment and Brillstein Entertainment Partners, and 20th Century Fox Television distributes and owns the show.

On July 27, 2018, it was announced that Regina Hicks was joining the series as an executive producer and co-showrunner alongside Bouchard and Gad. Still, credits show her only being listed as a consultant. Former King of the Hill writer Sanjay Shah and former The Office writer Halsted Sullivan serve as the series' showrunners. On March 10, 2021, Apple TV+ renewed the series for a third season ahead of the second-season premiere and the second season premiered on June 25, 2021. Loren Bouchard said seasons two and three will consist of 29 episodes and an additional 115 songs. The third season premiered on September 9, 2022, with the first three episodes available immediately and the rest debuting on a weekly basis until the season finale on November 18, 2022. On December 3, 2023, Josh Gad announced that Central Park was cancelled after three seasons.

=== Casting ===
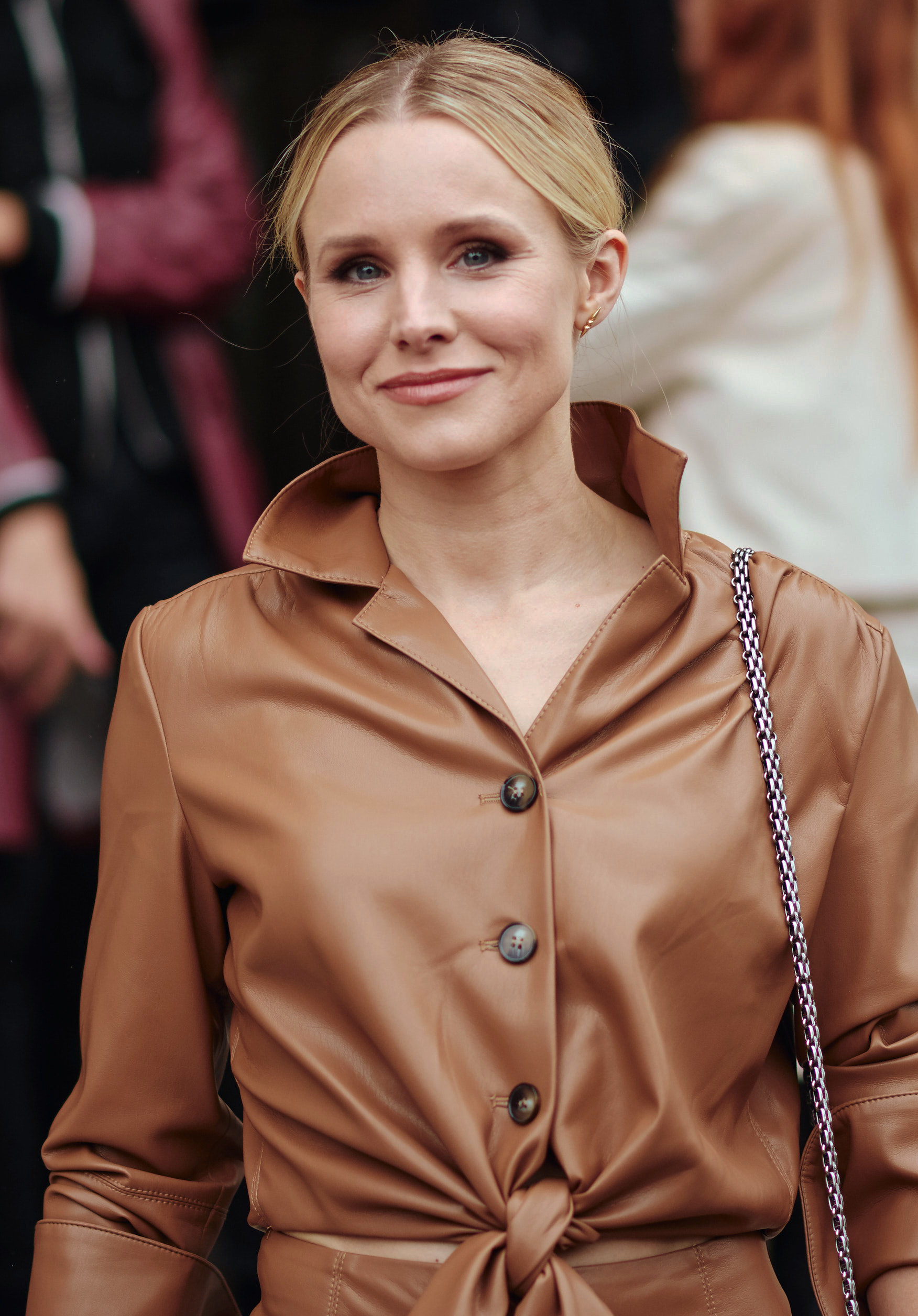
Kristen Bell

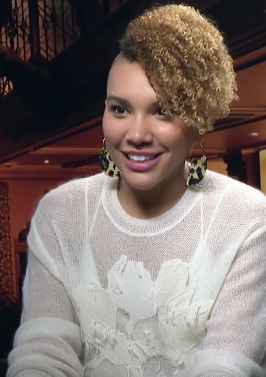
Emmy Raver-Lampman

Alongside the initial series announcement, it was reported that Gad, Leslie Odom Jr., Tituss Burgess, Kristen Bell, Stanley Tucci, Daveed Diggs, and Kathryn Hahn had been cast as series regulars. On July 24, 2020, Emmy Raver-Lampman was cast as Molly Tillerman, the mixed-race protagonist originally portrayed by Bell.

==== Controversy ====
In June 2020, Bell, who is white, announced that she would no longer provide the voice of Molly, who is biracial, in the second season of Central Park. Molly's role would be recast with a person of color, and Bell would instead voice a new role. Loren Bouchard had defended this casting at a January 2020 TCA panel, stating that Bell "needed to be Molly, she was always going to honor that character. We couldn't make Molly white or Kristen mixed race, so we had to go forward." Bouchard apologized for that statement in June 2020. The following month, Raver-Lampman was recast to voice the role of Molly. Bell returned to the show in season three in the role of Abby, Paige's sister and an aspiring actress newly arrived in New York.

=== Music ===
Each episode includes about four original musical numbers sung by the cast. In total, the first season alone includes 46 original songs. Gad joked he had to "beg, plead and barter to get four songs an episode." The songs in the first two episodes were written by several songwriters, including Elyssa Samsel and Kate Anderson (the songwriters for Olaf's Frozen Adventure), Bouchard, Smith, Davis, Sara Bareilles, and Brent Knopf. Samsel also plays the violin for Birdie's solos. Songs in the first season were written by such artists as Fiona Apple, Meghan Trainor, Cyndi Lauper, Alan Menken and Glenn Slater, Darren Criss, Utkarsh Ambudkar and Aimee Mann. The songs from the first two episodes were made available by Hollywood Records on streaming services the day the show premiered. Among songwriters announced for the second season include cast members Diggs and Gad, as well as Rufus Wainwright, They Might Be Giants, Ingrid Michaelson, returning songwriter Rafael Casal, John Cameron Mitchell, Tank and the Bangas, and Don't Stop or We'll Die.

==== Track listing ====
Song-tral Park (Episodes 1-2)
No.	Title	Writer(s)	Length
1.	"Central in My Heart"	Kate Anderson & Elyssa Samsel	2:37
2.	"Heiress to a Fortune"	Anderson & Samsel	0:20
3.	"Own It"	Anderson & Samsel	3:46
4.	"Poops I'll Pick Up"	Loren Bouchard, Steven Davis & Nora Smith	2:08
5.	"Shampagne Was My Best Friend"	Anderson & Samsel (lyrics), Smith (music)	0:57
6.	"Central to My Plot"	Anderson & Samsel	1:01
7.	"Weirdos Make Great Superheroes"	Sara Bareilles	2:34
8.	"Make 'Em Pay"	Brent Knopf	1:51
9.	"Weirdos Make Great Superheroes Reprise"	Bareilles & Knopf	1:02
10.	"Do It While We Can"	Knopf	2:51

Song-tral Park (Episode 3)
No.	Title	Writer(s)	Length
1.	"Momma's Got This"	Anderson & Samsel	1:37
2.	"Momma's Got This Reprise"	Anderson & Samsel	0:35
3.	"Don't Think About the Failures"	Anderson & Samsel	1:02
4.	"Birdie Busking"	Bouchard, Josh Gad, Samsel & Smith	1:35
5.	"The Park Is Mine"	Utkarsh Ambudkar & Rafael Casal	1:52

Song-tral Park (Episode 4)
No.	Title	Writer(s)	Length
1.	"Garbage Ballet"	Cyndi Lauper & William Wittman	1:19
2.	"Rats"	Lauper & Teddy Sinclair	1:50
3.	"I'm the Worst"	Knopf	0:50
4.	"Manager to Manager"	Davis, Knopf & Kelvin Yu	1:59
5.	"Rats Calypso Reprise (Rats - End Credits)"	Lauper & Sinclair	1:08

Song-tral Park (Episode 5)
No.	Title	Writer(s)	Length
1.	"Spoiler Alert"	Alan Menken & Glenn Slater	1:38
2.	"If There's a Will"	Anderson & Samsel	2:12
3.	"Method to This Madness"	Anderson & Samsel	1:38
4.	"If There's a Will Reprise"	Anderson & Samsel	1:12
5.	"If There's a Will (End Credits)"	Anderson & Samsel	0:45

Song-tral Park (Episode 6)
No.	Title	Writer(s)	Length
1.	"First Class Hands"	Darren Criss	3:09
2.	"Too Close"	Anderson & Samsel	2:32
3.	"Show Up"	Anderson & Samsel	2:01
4.	"What Could Go Wrong?"	Knopf	1:16

Song-tral Park (Episode 7)
No.	Title	Writer(s)	Length
1.	"Nuts Nuts Nuts"	Jeff Drake & Knopf	2:18
2.	"Big Deal"	Aimee Mann	2:00
3.	"Can We Do Today Again?"	Drake & Knopf	2:21
4.	"Can We Do Today Again? Reprise"	Knopf	0:32

Song-tral Park (Episode 8)
No.	Title	Writer(s)	Length
1.	"I'm in a Perfect Relationship"	Meghan Trainor	2:17
2.	"TOSGANO"	Knopf	1:46
3.	"Imperfectly Perfect"	Anderson & Samsel	2:29
4.	"I'm in a Perfect Relationship (End Credits)"	Trainor	1:05

Song-tral Park (Episode 9)
No.	Title	Writer(s)	Length
1.	"Live It Up Tonight"	Anthony Hamilton & Charles Holloman Jr.	0:40
2.	"Zoom's Home Alone 2 Deleted Scenes Tour"	Knopf	1:27
3.	"Rated Hard PG, for Spookiness"	Knopf	1:12
4.	"I Did Not Account for This"	Anderson & Samsel	1:49
5.	"Live It Up Tonight (End Credits)"	Hamilton & Holloman	1:14

Song-tral Park (Episode 10)
No.	Title	Writer(s)	Length
1.	"Hell-Fish"	Knopf	1:51
2.	"New York Doesn't Like Your Face"	Fiona Apple & David Lucky	2:28
3.	"Dick Flake"	Anderson & Samsel	1:11
4.	"Die Trying"	Anderson & Samsel	3:20

Central Park Season Two, The Soundtrack - Songs in the Key of the Park (Blackout) [Original Soundtrack]
No.	Title	Writer(s)	Length
1.	"Middle of It All"	Samsel & Anderson	1:26
2.	"Weehawken"	Supercommuter	2:08
3.	"Come into the Darkness"	Yu, Davis, Dacey	1:25
4.	"W(h)itch Way"	Samsel & Anderson	2:47
5.	"In the Dark (End Credits)"	John Cameron Mitchell	0:46

Central Park Season Two, The Soundtrack - Songs in the Key of the Park (Mothers Daze) [Original Soundtrack]
No.	Title	Writer(s)	Length
1.	"All About You"	Taura Stinson	2:07
2.	"Pour Poor Me More Please"	They Might Be Giants	2:25
3.	"This Is It"	Stinson	1:15
4.	"This Is It Reprise"	Bouchard, Stinson	0:54
5.	"Promise"	Jess Furman, Alana De Fonseca	1:58

Central Park Season Two, The Soundtrack - Songs in the Key of the Park (Fista Puffs Mets Out Justice) [Original Soundtrack]
No.	Title	Writer(s)	Length
1.	"The Fista Puffs Theme Song"	Knopf	1:54
2.	"Pow Pow Boom Booms"	Gad, Ben Romans	2:42
3.	"No One's Home"	Samsel, Anderson	2:26
4.	"Trying Too Hard"	Samsel, Anderson	3:16
5.	"Pow Pow Boom Booms (End Credits)"	Gad, Romans	0:46

Central Park Season Two, The Soundtrack - Songs in the Key of the Park (Of Course You Realize, This Means Ward) [Original Soundtrack]
No.	Title	Writer(s)	Length
1.	"The Answer Is Ward"	Drake, Patrick & Tim Dacey	2:23
2.	"Kite String"	Rufus Wainwright	2:09
3.	"Why Bother?"	Drake, P. & T. Dacey	2:45
4.	"Why Bother? (End Credits)"	Drake, P. & T. Dacey	0:47

Central Park Season Two, The Soundtrack - Songs in the Key of the Park (Down to the Wire) [Original Soundtrack]
No.	Title	Writer(s)	Length
1.	"I Have a Bra-blem"	Tank and the Bangas	1:44
2.	"Little Key"	Ciampi, Meredith Dawson, Smith	0:30
3.	"Keep It Low Key"	Samsel & Anderson	2:13
4.	"Down to the Wire"	Samsel & Anderson	2:04
5.	"Bra-blem Solved"	Tank and the Bangas	0:42
6.	"Keep It Low Key (End Credits)"	Samsel & Anderson	0:42

Central Park Season Two, The Soundtrack - Songs in the Key of the Park (The Shadow) [Original Soundtrack]
No.	Title	Writer(s)	Length
1.	"The Shadow"	Daveed Diggs	1:53
2.	"That Was All Me"	Samsel & Anderson	2:25
3.	"A Moment Forever Ago"	Samsel & Anderson	2:34
4.	"A Thing on Strings (A Busker's Serenade)"	Samsel	5:14
5.	"A Moment Forever Ago (End Credits)"	Samsel & Anderson	0:42
6.	"A Moment Forever Ago (Demo Version)"	Samsel & Anderson	2:17

Central Park Season Two, The Soundtrack - Songs in the Key of the Park (A Decent Proposal) [Original Soundtrack]
No.	Title	Writer(s)	Length
1.	"Will I Fit"	Regina Spektor	1:17
2.	"Will I Fit Reprise"	Spektor	1:01
3.	"My Worst Day"	Casal	2:08
4.	"Puppy Love"	Don't Stop or We'll Die	1:16
5.	"How It Happened"	Samsel & Anderson	2:41
6.	"How It Happened Reprise"	Samsel & Anderson, Ava Tramer	0:59
7.	"Puppy Love (End Credits)"	Don't Stop or We'll Die	0:49

Central Park Season Two, The Soundtrack - Songs in the Key of the Park (Sir Bricks-A-Lot) [Original Soundtrack]
No.	Title	Writer(s)	Length
1.	"Paint the World"	Ingrid Michaelson	2:50
2.	"A Different Paige"	Samsel & Anderson	2:17
3.	"Follow Through"	Samsel & Anderson	2:53
4.	"A Different Paige (End Credits)"	Samsel & Anderson	0:56

Central Park Season Two, The Soundtrack - Songs in the Key of the Park (A Boat-iful Mind) [Original Soundtrack]
No.	Title	Writer(s)	Length
1.	"I'm Bad (At Being Bad)"	Martin Kierszenbaum, Orville Burrell	1:47
2.	"Smooth Sailing"	Emeen Zarookian	1:30
3.	"Highest Suite in the Hotel"	Will Reynolds, Eric Price, Kevin Larsen	1:41
4.	"From a New Angle"	Samsel & Anderson	1:41
5.	"I'm Bad (At Being Bad) (End Credits)"	Kierszenbaum, Burrell	0:37

Central Park Season Two, The Soundtrack - Songs in the Key of the Park (Bee Is for Brandenham) [Original Soundtrack]
No.	Title	Writer(s)	Length
1.	"Ideally I'd Deal with It"	Knopf	2:11
2.	"It Stings"	Anderson & Samsel	3:01
3.	"Flyin' High"	Anderson & Samsel	2:15
4.	"It Stings (End Credits)"	Anderson & Samsel	0:45

Central Park Season Two, The Soundtrack - Songs in the Key of the Park (The PAIGE-riarchy!) [Original Soundtrack]
No.	Title	Writer(s)	Length
1.	"Awfully Beautiful"	Drake, Lindsey Stoddart, Smith, T. & P. Dacey	1:07
2.	"Rockin' on the Rag"	Elana Belle Carroll	1:26
3.	"Light the Match"	Danny Elfman	2:34
4.	"Why Me Waikiki"	Rachael Cantu	2:10
5.	"Awfully Beautiful (End Credits)"	Drake, Stoddart, Smith, T. & P. Dacey	0:45

Central Park Season Two, The Soundtrack - Songs in the Key of the Park (Castle Sweet Castle) [Original Soundtrack]
No.	Title	Writer(s)	Length
1.	"Maybe Potentially Great"	Anderson & Samsel	2:58
2.	"Restoration"	Casal	1:36
3.	"You are the Music"	Kristen Anderson-Lopez & Robert Lopez	2:49
4.	"We are the Music (End Credits)"	Anderson-Lopez & Lopez	1:04

Central Park Season Two, The Soundtrack - Songs in the Key of the Park (Celeste We Forget) [Original Soundtrack]
No.	Title	Writer(s)	Length
1.	"Big Stink"	Stinson	1:52
2.	"A Few Minutes for Magic"	Don't Stop or We'll Die	2:00
3.	"Turtle Babies"	Antwan Patton	0:53
4.	"Havin' a Plan"	Anderson & Samsel	2:24
5.	"Today Stinks (Reprise)"	Drake, Smith, Stinson	0:46
6.	"Turtle Babies (End Credits)"	Patton	0:40

Central Park Season Two, The Soundtrack - Songs in the Key of the Park (The Ballad of Johnnie Lee) [Original Soundtrack]
No.	Title	Writer(s)	Length
1.	"I Mooned the Whole School"	Ciampi, Smith	0:56
2.	"The Name is Johnnie Lee"	Yolanda Claire Quartey	2:05
3.	"Ode to Johnnie Lee"	Knopf	1:37
4.	"When the Bottom Falls Out"	Anderson & Samsel	3:10
5.	"The Name is Johnnie Lee (End Credits)"	Quartey	0:49

Central Park Season Two, The Soundtrack - Songs in the Key of the Park (Where There's Smoke) [Original Soundtrack]
No.	Title	Writer(s)	Length
1.	"Clean Money"	Alan Chang and Michael Bublé	1:54
2.	"Onto Something"	Michael Anthony Viola	1:00
3.	"I Love How Sad You Make Me"	Tramer, Zarookian	1:37
4.	"Gotta Grab It"	Viola	1:36

Central Park Season Two, The Soundtrack - Songs in the Key of the Park (The Lyin' in Winter) [Original Soundtrack]
No.	Title	Writer(s)	Length
1.	"Up to Here"	Anderson & Samsel	2:25
2.	"Time to Close"	Anderson & Samsel	2:28
3.	"Own It (Reprise)"	Anderson & Samsel, Ciampi, Gad	1:18
4.	"A Walk in the Park"	Wyclef Jean	2:20

== Reception ==
=== Critical response ===
Central Park has received acclaim from critics. On Rotten Tomatoes, the first season holds an approval rating of 94% based on 47 reviews, with an average rating of 7.4/10. The website's critical consensus reads, "With warmth, wit, and a pitch perfect ensemble, Central Park is a joyously hilarious musical love letter to the Big Apple." On Metacritic, it has a weighted average score of 81 out of 100 based on 13 reviews, indicating "universal acclaim".

On Rotten Tomatoes, the second season has an approval rating of 100% based on 17 reviews, with an average rating of 7.8/10. The website's critical consensus states, "Featuring more stellar songs and a tenderhearted focus on family, Central Park is even more delightful in this reprise. On Metacritic, the second season has a weighted average score of 82 out of 100 based on 4 reviews, indicating "universal acclaim".

=== Accolades ===
Year	Award	Category	Recipient(s)	Result	Ref.
2020	AAFCA TV Honors	Best Animated	Central Park	Won	
2020	Primetime Emmy Awards	Outstanding Character Voice-Over Performance	Leslie Odom Jr. as Owen Tillerman (for "Episode One")	Nominated	
2021	Artios Awards	Outstanding Achievement in Casting - Television Animation	Julie Ashton	Nominated	
2021	Critics' Choice Super Awards	Best Animated Series	Central Park	Nominated	
2021	NAACP Image Awards	Outstanding Animated Series	Central Park	Nominated	
2021	Primetime Emmy Awards	Outstanding Character Voice-Over Performance	Tituss Burgess as Cole Tillerman (for "A Fish Called Snakehead")	Nominated	
2021	Primetime Emmy Awards	Outstanding Character Voice-Over Performance	Stanley Tucci as Bitsy Brandenham (for "A Fish Called Snakehead")	Nominated	
2022	Artios Awards	Outstanding Achievement in Casting - Television Animation	Julie Ashton	Nominated	
2022	Hollywood Critics Association TV Awards	Best Streaming Animated Series or Television Movie	Central Park	Nominated	
2022	Primetime Emmy Awards	Outstanding Character Voice-Over Performance	Stanley Tucci as Bitsy Brandenham (for "Central Dark")	Nominated	
2023	NAACP Image Awards	Outstanding Animated Series	Central Park	Nominated	
2023	Astra Creative Arts TV Awards	Best Streaming Animated Series or TV Movie	Central Park	Nominated	
