= Turf War (The Office) =

- The Office episode
- Episode no.: Season 8 Episode 23
- Directed by: Daniel Chun
- Written by: Warren Lieberstein; Halsted Sullivan
- Cinematography by: Matt Sohn
- Editing by: Claire Scanlon; David Rogers; Rob Burnett
- Production code: 823
- Original air date: May 3, 2012

Guest appearances
- Chris Bauer as Harry Jannerone; Andy Buckley as David Wallace; Dan Castellaneta as Mr. Ramish

Episode chronology
← Previous "Fundraiser"	Next → "Free Family Portrait Studio"
- The Office (American season 8)

"Turf War" is the twenty-third and penultimate episode of the eighth season of the American comedy television series The Office, and the show's 175th episode overall. The episode originally aired on NBC on May 3, 2012. "Turf War" was written by Warren Lieberstein and Halsted Sullivan, and was directed by Daniel Chun. The episode guest stars Chris Bauer, Andy Buckley, and Dan Castellaneta.

The series—presented as if it were a real documentary—depicts the everyday lives of office employees in the Scranton, Pennsylvania, branch of the fictional Dunder Mifflin Paper Company. In the episode, Robert California (James Spader) drunkenly shuts down a branch in Binghamton, and Jim Halpert (John Krasinski) and Dwight Schrute (Rainn Wilson) must outsmart a salesman, Harry Jannerone (Chris Bauer), from the Syracuse branch. Meanwhile, Andy Bernard (Ed Helms) decides to land an important client as a "rogue" and jumpstart his Dunder Mifflin comeback by using his success as leverage with Robert.

"Turf War" received mixed reviews from critics, with many criticizing the show's decision to recycle elements of the Michael Scott Paper Company fifth season story arc. "Turf War" was viewed by an estimated 4.44 million viewers and received a 2.3 rating/7% share among adults between the ages of 18 and 49. The episode ranked third in its timeslot and was also the highest-rated NBC series of the night.

== Synopsis ==
Dwight Schrute and Gabe Lewis argue over whose workout regimen is superior. Jim Halpert suggests they have a thigh curl contest to settle the argument. During the contest, Jim props their elbows up on pillows and tricks them into thinking they each have phone calls, then takes a picture, editing it as a computer wallpaper to make it look like Gabe and Dwight have had a gossipy sleepover. Dwight and Gabe are angered that Jim is mocking them for “perfecting [their] bodies,” but can’t properly walk to the conference room, forcing Dwight to have Jim support him.

While "celebrating the finalization of his divorce", Robert California drunkenly shuts down the Binghamton branch of Dunder Mifflin. The resulting commotion allows the sales team in Scranton, specifically Jim and Dwight, to begin poaching former customers of the closed branch. Harry Jannerone, an angry employee from the Syracuse branch of Dunder Mifflin arrives in Scranton to berate Jim and Dwight for taking New York clients even though those particular clients are closer to Scranton than Syracuse. The two argue, dropping the name of a particularly large client, Prestige Direct Mail Solutions, that is up for grabs. Andy Bernard, who is cooking lunch for everyone in the office, overhears the argument and gets an idea: if he can win the client, he might be able to use the account as leverage to get his job as manager back.

Andy rushes to Prestige Direct and impresses the CEO with his dedication—in addition to his personal phone number, he also gives him a copy of his house key. Meanwhile, Dwight, Jim, and Harry rush to the company in an attempt to win the client, only to hear that the company has gone with Andy. After Andy wins the client, he calls Robert and offers him the client if Robert will re-hire him. Furious at his attempt to blackmail him, Robert profanely threatens Andy, and hangs up on him. This leads Andy to seek help from David Wallace, the former Chief Financial Officer of Dunder Mifflin who has become a multi-millionaire. Andy tells David that, despite being in poor shape, Dunder Mifflin could be worth twice its net worth if the company's management is restructured. This piques David's interest, who allows Andy to come into his home and talk to him about his business proposal.

After Nellie Bertram reveals to Robert that he sent her a sexually suggestive voicemail, Robert tasks Pam Halpert with finding what the voicemail entailed. Initially, Pam tries to trick Nellie into divulging the contents of the message, but this plan is ruined when Angela Lipton shows up, claiming that she was Robert's "back-up plan" in case Pam failed. Finally, Pam steals Nellie's phone and brings it to Robert and the two listen to the various voice messages. After hearing several which paint a life for Nellie that is sad and lonely—she is unable to adopt a child and she has maxed out her credit cards—Pam relents and tells Robert that she will not help him anymore. Pam returns Nellie's phone and the two strike up a conversation. Nellie reveals to Pam her disgust for Robert, saying that he is sexually obsessed. She asks Pam if she wants to hear about Robert's voicemail, but Pam declines her offer. In the end, Nellie reveals to the camera that she is deeply moved to have a real friend at her work place.

After learning that they have lost Prestige Direct, Jim, Dwight and Harry retreat outside for a coffee break. They end up having a conversation over what they would do with their lives, if they were not working for Dunder Mifflin. Jim jokingly says that he would be a beet growing competitor during the national contests while Harry would retire after selling one big item such as an airplane. Before he leaves, Harry says that Robert will be the ruin of the company and suggests they will not be working for Dunder Mifflin in six months, leaving a look of concern on Dwight and Jim's faces.

== Production ==
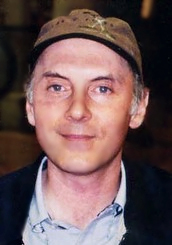
Dan Castellaneta guest-starred as the CEO of Prestige Direct Sale Solutions.

"Turf War" was written by Warren Lieberstein and Halsted Sullivan, and was directed by Daniel Chun. The episode features the second consecutive appearance of David Wallace (Andy Buckley), former CFO of Dunder Mifflin, after his reappearance in "Fundraiser. Chris Bauer guest-starred in this episode as a rival branch manager who believes Dunder Mifflin Scranton is stealing their clients. In addition, Dan Castellaneta guest-starred as the CEO of Prestige Direct Sale Solutions. The Season Eight DVD contains a number of deleted scenes from this episode. Notable cut scenes include Dwight berating Jim for owning a plethora of baby supplies, Pam and Angela trying to extract information from Nellie, Darryl feeding a mouse he finds in the break room, Erin and Darryl arguing over the name of the mouse, and Harry talking about the "same drama and whack-ados" that work at his branch.

== Cultural references ==
In an attempt to stall, Robert talks to the camera at lengths about geishas, using bizarre and cryptic metaphors. When Jim and Dwight are trying to outrun Harry, Dwight asks him if his car has a NOS, a reference to the 2001 film The Fast and the Furious. Jim answers in the affirmative, but turns on the windshield wipers, to Dwight's disdain. When Andy is trying to win over the CEO, he mentions that his wifi password is "eatpraylove", a reference to the book and movie of the same name.

== Reception ==
=== Ratings ===
"Turf War" originally aired on NBC in the United States on May 3, 2012. The episode was viewed by an estimated 4.44 million viewers and received a 2.3 rating/7% share among adults between the ages of 18 and 49. This means that it was seen by 2.3% of all 18- to 49-year-olds, and 7% of all 18- to 49-year-olds watching television at the time of the broadcast. The episode marked a 10% increase from the previous week's episode, "Fundraiser". The episode finished third in its time slot, being beaten by Grey's Anatomy which received a 3.3 rating/9% share and the CBS drama Person of Interest which received a 2.5 rating/7% share in the 18–49 demographic. The episode beat the Fox series Touch and The CW drama series The Secret Circle. Despite this, "Turf War" was the highest-rated NBC television episode of the night.

=== Reviews ===
The episode received mixed reviews from critics. Dan Forcella from TV Fanatic gave the episode a largely positive review and awarded it four out of five stars. Forcella praised the Jim–Dwight dynamic in the episode and wrote, "Jim and Dwight, and especially the latter, were terrific." In addition, Forcella positively compared the character growth of Nellie Bertam to Michael Scott, noting "the most heartwarming moment [was] her scene with Pam, in which Nellie was so happy to have made a friend, reminded me of so many Michael Scott moments of the past." Brett Harrison Davinger from The California Literary Review wrote moderately positive of the episode, saying, "Tonight's episode worked for the most part thanks to the ever reliable Robert California and the usually reliable Jim and Dwight: Partners." However, he did retroactively criticize season eight for not elaborating on the problems facing Dunder Mifflin until "Turf War". In addition, he called the premise of Andy seeking Wallace's help "iffy ... even if it was predictable". Jeffrey Hyatt from ScreenCrave wrote, "The immediate, don't over-analyze opinion here is that 'Turf War' is a top three episode of season 8, with a chance of it being number one." Furthermore, he concluded that the episode "was good, very good, and a nice way to get set for the season/series finale. ... The Office can still bring it when it wants to."

Myles McNutt from The A.V. Club wrote a mixed review and gave it a C+. He noted that the episode's closing scene, wherein Jim, Dwight, and Harry talk about Robert California ruining the company, was an example of a retcon that "the shift to a world with actual consequences is certainly a step in the right direction for the series, and one that slightly elevates 'Turf War' if not the season as a whole." However, McNutt was largely critical of the writing, noting that the closure of the Binghamton branch was a "cheap segue" that "render[ed] the show's characters as subservient to the narrative whims of the writers." He argued—specifically citing the unconcernedness that the Scranton employees showed after hearing that a neighboring branch was shut down—that many of the characters' motives were not effective because they simply acted as ciphers, through which the larger plots could unfold.

Several reviews were critical of Andy's paper company development. Many compared it, unfavorably, to the Michael Scott Paper Company fifth season story arc. Dyanamaria Leifsson from TV Equals wrote "Instead [of Andy making a mention to the Michael Scott Paper Company] the similarities were ignored and we were expected to treat this as a novel idea." Craig McQuinn from The Faster Times sardonically wrote "remember how good the Michael Scott Paper Company storyline was?" a reference to the episode's reuse of an old and existing story arc. In addition, several reviews criticized the cold opening. California Literary noted that, "The string of good, relatable cold opens ends tonight as Dwight and Gabe engage in a manliest man contest." Myles McNutt called the scene "just nonsense".
