= Koi Pond (The Office) =

- The Office episode
- Episode no.: Season 6 Episode 8
- Directed by: Reggie Hudlin
- Written by: Warren Lieberstein; Halsted Sullivan
- Cinematography by: Matt Sohn
- Editing by: Grady Cooper
- Production code: 608
- Original air date: October 29, 2009

Episode chronology
← Previous "The Lover"	Next → "Double Date"
- The Office (American season 6)

"Koi Pond" is the eighth episode of the sixth season of the American comedy television series The Office and the show's 108th episode overall. The episode was written by Warren Lieberstein and Halsted Sullivan, and directed by Reggie Hudlin. It originally aired on NBC on October 29, 2009.

The series, presented in a mockumentary style, depicts the everyday lives of office employees at the Scranton, Pennsylvania branch of the fictitious Dunder Mifflin Paper Company. In the episode, Michael (Steve Carell) and Jim (John Krasinski) go to a sales meeting across town, where Michael falls in a koi pond and has to return to the office soaking wet. Meanwhile, Pam (Jenna Fischer) and Andy (Ed Helms), as punishment for having the two lowest sales records in the office, are required to go cold calling for sales across town. The episode achieved a viewership of 8.2 million in the United States.

The cold opening of the episode featured Michael hosting a haunted house in the company's warehouse for the office workers' children, where Michael pretends to hang himself at the end in an attempt to scare the children. The cold open aired only once, on the night of the episode's premiere, and was subsequently pulled from future reruns by NBC. The episode received mostly positive reviews from critics.

== Synopsis ==
Jim Halpert sets up a meeting with a client who requests that Michael Scott come with him. Jim is unhappy because he wants to be able to do meetings by himself. When they come back from the meeting, Michael is soaked because he fell into a koi pond. When they find out, the rest of the office makes fun of him. Michael responds by holding a sensitivity meeting where he asks everyone to write down things they wish were not said about them. The meeting goes nowhere, so Jim ends it. To help, Jim tells Michael that if he mocks himself, the rest of the office will be less inclined to mock him. This works, but Michael gets carried away and rambles into a self-pitying confessional about his loneliness. Meredith Palmer receives a copy of the security tape showcasing Michael's fall. The tape shows that Jim could have stopped Michael from falling but deliberately stepped away. Jim admits that he wished he had gone by himself because he wants to be able to do things by himself as a co-manager; Michael's mood is lifted when he realizes that Jim is jealous of his sales skills. Jim then becomes the victim of office mocking, but he and Michael laugh it off later.

Pam Halpert and Andy Bernard go cold calling to drum up more sales, as they have the lowest quarterly sales numbers in the branch. At the first place they go to, the receptionist notices Pam's pregnancy and assumes Andy is the father. Pam reacts to the mistake with alarm, offending Andy. During the next meeting, the client also assumes that Andy is the father, and in an act of revenge Andy harshly mocks the idea, leaving Pam frustrated and costing them the sale. At the next place they go to, that client also assumes Andy is the father, and this time they play along with it in order to avoid further antagonizing each other and ruining their sales. Andy takes it too far by touching her belly, even kissing it, and indulging in extensive baby talk, but the client says "maybe" to signing with them. In the car back to the office, Andy admits that he enjoyed pretending to be a father and is unhappy that he is still single. He then admits his attraction to Erin Hannon. Sympathizing with Andy, Pam approaches Erin and tries to set them up.

== Reception ==
This episode was watched by 8.2 million viewers, with a 4.2 rating and a 10 share in the 18–49 demographic.

== Controversy ==
The original aired version featured a cold open where Michael turned the warehouse into a haunted house for children for Halloween. At the end of the scene, Michael is pretending to hang himself. The scene was pulled from the reruns and DVD versions due to a protest from Caryn Zucker, then-wife of NBC Universal's CEO Jeff Zucker, who worked in suicide prevention.
