= Halsted Sullivan =

American television writer and producer

- Education: University of Virginia
- Occupations: Television writer, producer
- Years active: 2003–present

Halsted Sullivan is an American television writer and producer who has worked on shows such as Carpoolers and The Office. He often works with his writing partner Warren Lieberstein. He's currently an executive producer and one of the two showrunners on Central Park. He is a 1989 graduate of University of Virginia.

== Career ==
Sullivan worked on ABC's 2003 series All of Us. He has also written for Second Time Around, Modern Men, The Chris Rock Show and Carpoolers. He joined the writing staff of The Office at the end of its fifth season and became a producer at the beginning of the sixth season. He was nominated for a Writers Guild of America award for writing on The Office.

=== Episodes of The Office ===
Episodes are all co-written with Warren Lieberstein.

1. "Cafe Disco" (5.27)
2. "Koi Pond" (6.08)
3. "Whistleblower" (6.26)
4. "China" (7.10)
5. "After Hours" (8.16)
6. "Turf War" (8.23)
7. "Paper Airplane" (9.20)
