= Second Time Around (TV series) =

American television sitcom (2004–2005)

- Genre: Sitcom
- Created by: Ralph Farquhar; Michelle Listenbee Brown
- Directed by: Stan Lathan
- Starring: Boris Kodjoe; Nicole Ari Parker; Melissa De Sousa; Brian J. White; Danielle Nicolet
- Composer: Kurt Farquhar
- Country of origin: United States
- Original language: English
- No. of seasons: 1
- No. of episodes: 13

Production
- Executive producer: Claude Brooks
- Camera setup: Multi-camera
- Running time: 24 mins.
- Production companies: Regan Jon Productions; C to the B Productions; Paramount Network Television

Original release
- Network: UPN
- Release: September 20, 2004 – January 24, 2005

Second Time Around is an American sitcom that aired on UPN from September 20, 2004 to January 24, 2005. The series was canceled after one season.

== Premise ==
Set in Los Angeles, the show is centered on newlyweds Jackson (an architect) and Ryan Muse (an artist), who remarried after getting divorced three years earlier. Through the run of the show, Jackson and Ryan face situations involving past relationships, property ownership arguments and more. Other characters include Jackson's brother, Nigel, a well-to-do dentist; his extravagant, gold-digging fiancée Paula; and Coco, a restaurant owner who is Ryan's best friend.

== Cast ==
- Boris Kodjoe as Jackson Muse
- Nicole Ari Parker as Ryan Muse
- Brian J. White as Nigel Muse
- Danielle Nicolet as Paula
- Melissa De Sousa as Coco Herrera
- Mailon Rivera as Omar K. Bone
- Christina Vidal as Gabrielle Herrera

== Episodes ==
No.	Title	Directed by	Written by	Original release date	Viewers (millions)
1	"Pilot"	Stan Lathan	Ralph R. Farquhar & Michelle Listenbee-Brown	September 20, 2004	2.86
A few months into their second marriage, Ryan and Jackson Muse discovers that not talking about their past may lead into a few problems down the road. Meanwhile, Jackson’s brother, Nigel, and his fiancée, Paula, trick Jackson and Ryan into going to couples therapy with them to discover problems in their new marriage.
2	"For Better or Worse"	Stan Lathan	Efrem Seeger	September 27, 2004	3.17
A surprise run-in with an old marriage counselor leads Jackson and Ryan to realize that their marriage isn't perfect. Also, Jackson wants to be a member of Nigel's country club and coerces Ryan into pretending to be a high-society socialite in order to fit in.
3	"Pre-What?"	Stan Lathan	Calvin Brown, Jr.	October 4, 2004	3.35
Ryan and Jackson reveal that they both have doubts about their second marriage. Meanwhile, when Nigel asks Paula for a pre-nup, Paula sends him packing, forcing Nigel to renegotiate his way back into the relationship.
4	"No, No"	Stan Lathan	Warren Lieberstein & Halsted Sullivan	October 11, 2004	3.28
When Ryan changes her mind about wanting to have a baby, Jackson decides to kick-start Ryan's maternal instincts by buying her a puppy.
5	"Ryan Sees Party People"	Stan Lathan	Kriss Turner	October 18, 2004	3.45
After learning that Jackson hosted a slew of wild parties in their home before they were remarried, Ryan decides to find a new house for her and Jackson in order to escape her haunting visions of her husband as a free-loving bachelor and his many girlfriends.
6	"Crack That Whip"	Stan Lathan	B. Mark Seabrooks	October 25, 2004	3.17
Though past experiences have taught her not work with her husband, Ryan reluctantly agrees to help Jackson land a job redesigning her art gallery. Meanwhile, when Nigel's office manager quits, Paula bullies her way into the position at his office.
7	"Coupling Up"	Henry Chan	Jessica Kaminsky	November 8, 2004	3.14
When Ryan and Jackson try to add variety to their social life, they decide to break plans with their usual set of friends and rekindle a friendship with Chris and Amanda, a seemingly perfect couple from their past, but their double date goes awry when the Muses discover that their friends' happy marriage is just an act.
8	"Secrets"	Sheldon Epps	Sarah M. Fitzgerald	November 15, 2004	3.35
Ryan is furious when she discovers that Jackson helped buy his ex-fiancée a car, but when she realizes that he has always fallen for the damsel in distress routine, a usually self-sufficient Ryan turns on the helpless act believing that is what her husband wants.
9	"A Kiss is Still a Kiss"	Stan Lathan	T. Smith III	November 22, 2004	3.46
Ryan and Jackson's honeymoon plans get derailed by an argument just before their planes leaves the gate, but chance encounters with other people give them insight into their own relationship. Meanwhile, Coco tries to break up a date between her sister Gabrielle and her sex-crazed boyfriend. Tracee Ellis Ross guest stars.
10	"Sins of Paula's Father"	Stan Lathan	Kim Duran	November 29, 2004	3.26
Paula's con-artist dad, John Paul (Montel Williams), pays her a surprise visit at her Christmas party and swindles an unwitting Jackson out of several thousand dollars. Meanwhile, Ryan tries to mend the bridges between Paula and her estranged father.
11	"Big Bank, Little Bank"	Stan Lathan	Kenny Smith	January 3, 2005	3.13
Jackson regrets the decision to keep his bank account separate from Ryan's when she sells a painting for a large amount of money and he comes up short to buy Lakers tickets. Meanwhile, Paula volunteers to chair a children's charity fundraising event for a chance to mingle with a high society crowd to boost her real estate business.
12	"You're Fired!"	Stan Lathan	Calvin Brown, Jr.	January 10, 2005	2.88
When Jackson's employer cuts health benefits, he tries to rally the employees to fight the system. Meanwhile, Nigel and Paula try to out-gift Jackson and Ryan for their mother's birthday.
13	"The Dinner Party"	Stan Lathan	Ralph R. Farquhar & Michelle Listenbee-Brown	January 24, 2005	2.87
When Jackson's controlling mother Christa makes a surprise visit, she blames Ryan for everything that is going badly in her children's lives. Meanwhile, Jackson and Nigel try to convince their sister Martine not to tell their mother that she is gay. Rhona Bennett guest stars.
