= Song of Back and Neck =

- Theatrical release poster
- Directed by: Paul Lieberstein
- Written by: Paul Lieberstein
- Produced by: Kim Leadford; Paul Lieberstein; Jennifer Prediger
- Starring: Paul Lieberstein; Rosemarie DeWitt; Robert Pine; Brian d'Arcy James; Clark Duke; Sam Anderson
- Cinematography: Bartosz Nalazek
- Edited by: Gary Levy
- Music by: Antonio Andrade
- Production companies: StarStream Entertainment (Note: Credited as StarStream Media.); Exhibit; Boo Pictures; Afternoonnap (Note: Credited as Afternoon Nap)
- Distributed by: The Orchard
- Release dates: April 23, 2018 (Tribeca Film Festival); November 30, 2018 (United States)
- Running time: 85 minutes
- Country: United States
- Language: English

Song of Back and Neck is a 2018 American comedy film written and directed by Paul Lieberstein in his directorial debut. The film stars Lieberstein, Rosemarie DeWitt, Robert Pine, Brian d'Arcy James, Clark Duke, and Sam Anderson. The film was released on November 30, 2018, by The Orchard.

== Cast ==
- Paul Lieberstein as Fred Trolleycar
- Rosemarie DeWitt as Regan Stearns
- Robert Pine as David Trolleycar
- Brian d'Arcy James as Stone
- Clark Duke as Atkins
- Sam Anderson as Jarred Foxen
- Raymond Ma as Dr. Kuhang
- Alice Wen as Sia
- Ryan Lee as Ryan
- Luke Spencer Roberts as Pete
- Daniel Thrasher as Alex
- Paul Feig as Dr. Street
- Ike Barinholtz as Nurse
- Rajeev Chhibber as Charles
- Chelsea Cook as Jenny
- Treisa Gary as Beverly
- Alexis Hamer as Alexis
- Scott Hutchison as Scott
- Elizabeth Jardine as Ally
- Edwin Kho as Gon-Xi
- Nora Kirkpatrick as Nora
- Kaidy Kuna as Restaurant Manager
- Paul Kwo as Zhang Wei
- Jessica McKenna as Dawn
- Janine Poreba as Tracey
- Jennifer Prediger as Jennifer
- Trinka Soloway as Maurney
- William Wang as Dr. Huang's Teacher
- Coca Xie as Coca

== Release ==
The film premiered at the Tribeca Film Festival on April 23, 2018. On July 13, 2018, The Orchard acquired distribution rights to the film. The film was released on November 30, 2018, by The Orchard.

== Reception ==
On the review aggregator website Rotten Tomatoes, 67% of 12 critics' reviews are positive.
