= Warren Lieberstein =

American television writer and producer

- Born: Warren Keith Lieberstein; Westport, Connecticut, U.S.
- Occupations: Television writer, producer
- Years active: 1995–present
- Spouses: Angela Kinsey (m. 2000; div. 2010) Audrey Wauchope (m. 2016)
- Children: 3
- Relatives: Paul Lieberstein (brother); Susanne Daniels (sister); Greg Daniels (brother-in-law)

Warren Keith Lieberstein is an American television writer and producer. He has worked on television series such as Carpoolers and The Office and often works with his writing partner Halsted Sullivan.

== Career ==
Lieberstein worked on the short-lived sketch comedy series Hype in 2000 and on ABC's 2003 series All of Us. He has also written for Second Time Around, Modern Men and Carpoolers. He joined his brother on the writing staff of The Office at the end of its fifth season and became a producer at the beginning of the sixth season. He was nominated for a Writers Guild of America award for writing on The Office.

=== Episodes of The Office ===
Episodes are all co-written with Halsted Sullivan.

1. "Cafe Disco" (5.27)
2. "Koi Pond" (6.08)
3. "Whistleblower" (6.26)
4. "China" (7.10)
5. "After Hours" (8.16)
6. "Turf War" (8.23)
7. "Paper Airplane" (9.20)

== Personal life ==
He is the younger brother of Paul Lieberstein, The Office's former showrunner/actor, and his sister is Susanne Daniels (who is married to Greg Daniels, The Office's developer and original producer). Lieberstein and Angela Kinsey (who plays Angela Martin on The Office) were married for ten years and have a daughter who was born in 2008. The pair have remained on good terms since their divorce. Lieberstein married fellow television writer Audrey Wauchope in 2016 and they have two daughters together, born in 2014 and 2017. His family is Jewish.
