= Paul Lieberstein =

American actor and screenwriter (born 1967)

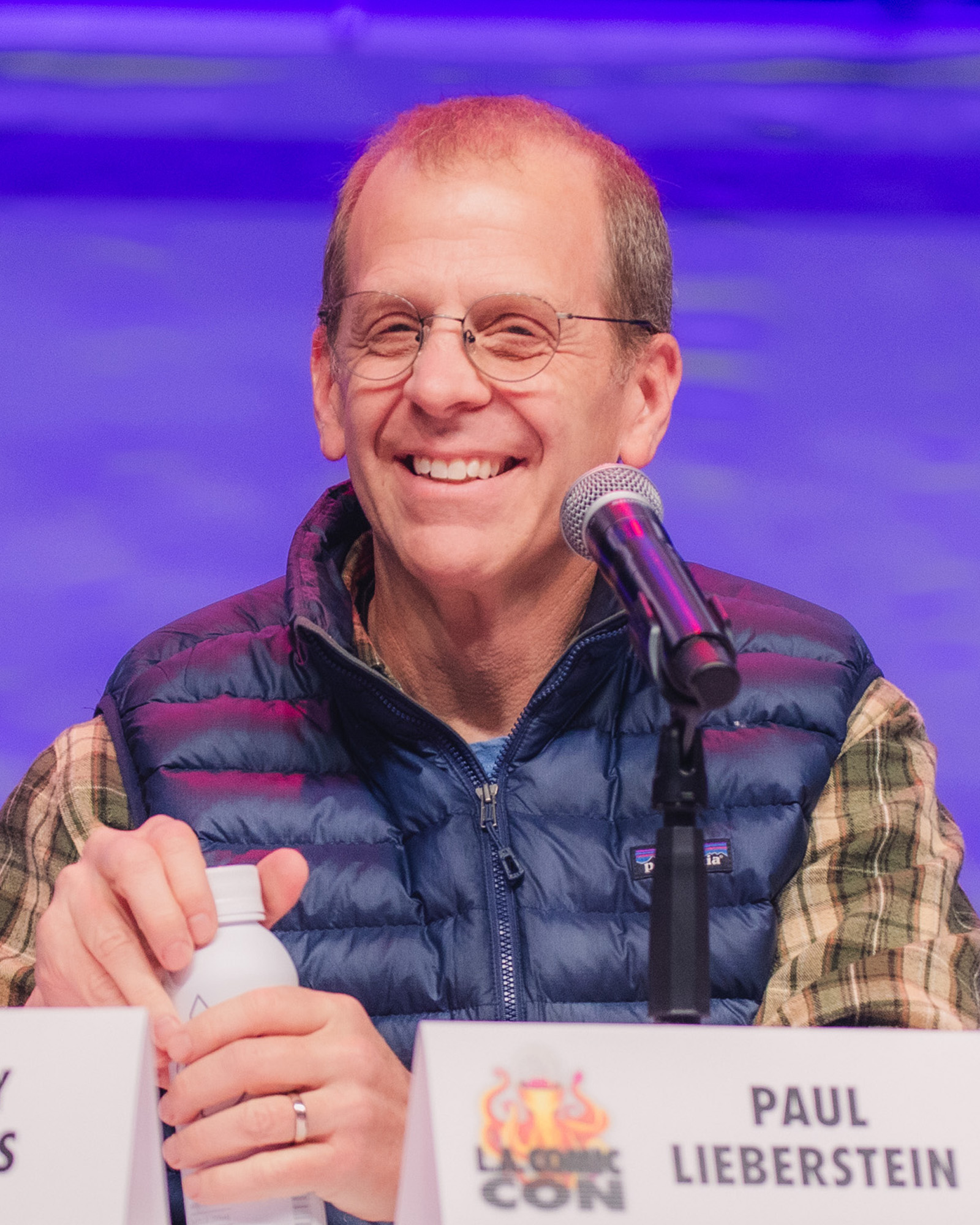
- Lieberstein in 2023
- Born: Paul Bevan Lieberstein; February 22, 1967 (age 59); Westport, Connecticut, U.S.
- Education: Hamilton College (BA)
- Occupations: Screenwriter; director; producer; actor
- Spouse: Janine Serafin Poreba (m. 2008)
- Relatives: Warren Lieberstein (brother); Susanne Daniels (sister); Greg Daniels (brother-in-law); Angela Kinsey (former sister-in-law)
- Writing career
- Years active: 1992–present
- Genre: Situation comedy

Paul Bevan Lieberstein (born February 22, 1967) is an American actor, screenwriter, television director and television producer. A Primetime Emmy Award winner, he is best known as a writer, executive producer, and supporting cast member on the NBC sitcom The Office, playing the role of Toby Flenderson. He served as the series' showrunner from seasons five to eight.

== Early life ==
Lieberstein grew up in Westport, Connecticut, the son of Judith and Stanley Lieberstein. He is Jewish. He attended Staples High School where he wrote his first comedy script with some friends; he also played the vibraphone in the band. He then attended Hamilton College, where he joined Chi Psi as well as a band called "Picture This" (not the pop band of the same name). He graduated in 1989 with a major in economics (he "wanted to be a financier of some kind"). He wrote references to the fact that Office character Andy Bernard was a member of Chi Psi from Cornell into the storyline of several episodes. After college, Lieberstein moved to New York City, where his first job was as an auditor at Peat Marwick International, a job that lasted six months. He followed that with part-time work at his father's law firm, "working as little as I could so I could write".

== Career ==
Lieberstein and a writing partner got an agent with William Morris and moved to Los Angeles, living just off Hollywood Boulevard. He landed his first writing job on Clarissa Explains It All, but was fired after one season when he and his writing partner split up. He then had short stints in a few other writer rooms, including Weird Science and The Naked Truth, before his brother-in-law Greg Daniels asked him to join the King of the Hill staff. He was a co-executive producer for 25 episodes in Season 6 of The Drew Carey Show, and a supervising producer for two episodes in that season: the season-opening "Drew Pops Something on Kate" (which he also wrote, along with "Drew and the Motorcycle" and "Drew and the Activist, Part I"), and "Buzzie Wuzzie Liked His Beer".

Lieberstein was also a producer on the third and final season of the television drama series The Newsroom. In November 2017, it was announced that he would replace Kevin Etten as showrunner of Ghosted. In 2018, Lieberstein wrote and directed his first feature film, Song of Back and Neck, which made it into Tribeca Film Festival. On April 3, 2020, he announced plans for a sitcom about office life while isolated due to the COVID-19 pandemic; the project eventually became the television film Out of Office.

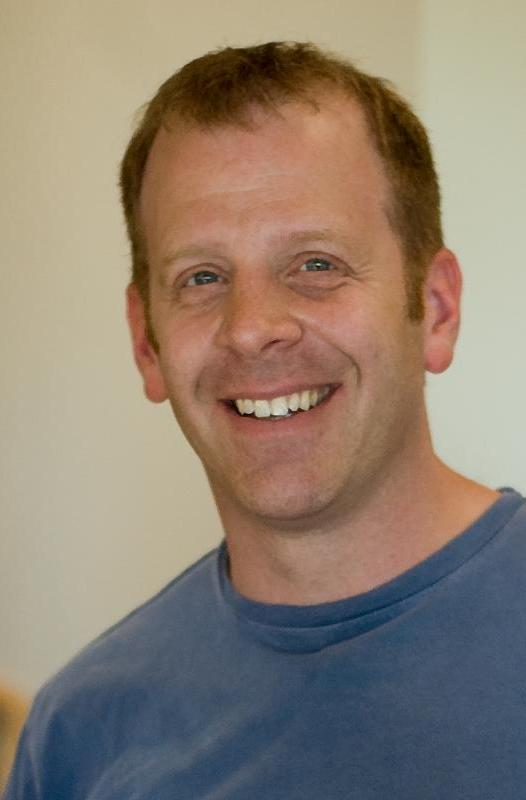
Lieberstein in 2008

=== The Office ===
On June 12, 2008, Variety magazine reported that Lieberstein would become one of the executive producers of The Office. He worked in the writer's room from the start of the American adaptation and was asked by Greg Daniels to act as well, as Daniels wanted some of the writers to know what it was like on the other side of the camera. Lieberstein has said he "attended 'The Office' acting school" and was often thrown by Steve Carell's improv during scenes.

On March 22, 2012, it was announced that Lieberstein would step down from his showrunner role to focus on a planned spin-off series featuring Rainn Wilson as Dwight Schrute, tentatively called The Farm. Lieberstein was set to be the showrunner, but in October 2012, it was announced that NBC was not accepting the series.

In a SuicideGirls interview, Lieberstein said that "as an actor, which is just a very small percentage of me, I don't feel Toby while I'm writing. It's the hardest of the characters to access". In an interview for his alma mater, Hamilton College, he commented on the bigger picture:

When we are in pre-production, this is the best job in the world. Working 10 to 7, sitting around and brainstorming with the other writers, making things funnier, and writing and rewriting scenes—that's as fun as it gets. Adding acting on top of all that makes for incredibly long, grueling days, sometimes 6 to midnight. But acting has its rewards. Comedy becomes intensified in short scenes. Doing a scene with Steve Carell, trying to keep up with him, is as tough and fun and weird as any part of the process.

== Personal life ==
Lieberstein's sister, Susanne, was the president of programming for YouTube Premium (previously holding this position at MTV), and is married to screenwriter and producer Greg Daniels. His brother, Warren Lieberstein, was married to Paul's The Office co-star Angela Kinsey. His cousin, Paul Faust, inspired and portrayed "Cool Guy Paul", as seen in The Office episode "Chair Model".

Lieberstein married Janine Serafin Poreba on July 19, 2008, at the New York City restaurant Battery Gardens.

He has served on the advisory board of directors for Young Storytellers, an arts education nonprofit organization based in Los Angeles.

== Awards ==
Lieberstein's first Emmy Award was as a producer, sharing a 1999 Emmy for "Outstanding Animated Program (For Programming One Hour or Less)" for his work in King of the Hill.

Lieberstein's work on The Office has resulted in numerous awards. In June 2007, he shared in a Daytime Emmy Award for "Outstanding Broadband Program – Comedy", for his work on The Office: Accountants webisodes. As an actor, Lieberstein shared in a 2006 Screen Actors Guild Award for "Outstanding Performance by an Ensemble in a Comedy Series"; as a writer, he shared a 2006 Writers Guild of America Award for the series, in addition to a WGA Award nomination for "The Coup". As co-executive producer, he shared a 2006 Emmy Award for "Outstanding Comedy Series".

Lieberstein received an Honorary Doctorate of Fine Arts degree from Hamilton College on May 22, 2011.

== Filmography ==
=== Acting ===
| Year | Title | Role | Notes |
|---|---|---|---|
| 2005–2013 | The Office | Toby Flenderson | 141 episodes |
| 2008 | The Office: The Outburst | Toby Flenderson | 2 episodes |
| 2009 | The Office: Blackmail | Toby Flenderson | Episode: "Pay Day" |
| 2009 | The Goods: Live Hard, Sell Hard | Selleck Last Customer | |
| 2014 | Bad Teacher | Evaluator | Episode: "Evaluation Day" |
| 2014 | The Newsroom | Richard Westbrook | 2 episodes |
| 2016 | Togetherness | Greg | Episode: "Geri-ina" |
| 2016 | The Mindy Project | Cuddle Spot Man | Episode: "Mindy Lahiri is DTF" |
| 2017 | People of Earth | Assessor | 5 episodes |
| 2018 | Song of Back and Neck | Fred | Also director, writer, and producer |
| 2019 | The Big Break | Ted | Short film |
| 2019 | Top Shelf Singles | Evan Caldwell | Post-production; short film |
| 2023 | Not an Artist | Dominic | |
| 2025 | Platonic | Dr. Melfi | Episode: "The Office Party" |
| 2026 | Rick and Morty | Little Mike (voice) | Episode: "Rick Days, Seven Nights" |

=== Directing, producing, writing ===
| Year | Title | Role | | | Notes |
| Year | Title | Director | Producer | Writer | Notes |
|---|---|---|---|---|---|
| 1992 | Clarissa Explains It All | No | No | Yes | Episode "President Ferguson" |
| 1994 | Weird Science | No | No | Yes | 3 episodes |
| 1995–1996 | The Naked Truth | No | No | Yes | 3 episodes |
| 1997–2000 | King of the Hill | No | Yes | Yes | Produced 50 episodes, wrote 12 episodes |
| 2000–2001 | The Drew Carey Show | No | Yes | Yes | Produced 27 episodes, wrote 3 episodes |
| 2002 | Greg the Bunny | No | Yes | Yes | Produced 2 episodes, wrote "Greg Gets Puppish" |
| 2002–2003 | The Bernie Mac Show | No | Yes | Yes | Produced 22 episodes, wrote 2 episodes |
| 2003 | Dead Like Me | No | No | Yes | Episode "The Bicycle Thief" |
| 2005–2013 | The Office | Yes | Yes | Yes | Directed 7 episodes Produced 166 episodes Wrote 16 episodes |
| 2006 | The Office: The Accountants | No | No | Yes | 10 episodes |
| 2013–2014 | The Mindy Project | Yes | No | No | 3 episodes |
| 2014 | The Newsroom | Yes | Yes | No | Directed "Oh Shenandoah", produced 6 episodes |
| 2018 | Song of Back and Neck | Yes | Yes | Yes | |
| 2018 | Ghosted | No | Yes | Yes | Produced 6 episodes, wrote "The Wire" |
| 2020 | Space Force | No | Yes | Yes | Produced 4 episodes, wrote "It's Good to Be Back on the Moon" |
| 2022 | Out of Office | Yes | No | Yes | |
| 2023 | Lucky Hank | No | Executive | Yes | Co-wrote three episodes; also co-developer |
| 2025 | The Paper | Yes | No | Yes | Directed "TTT vs the Blogger", wrote "The Ohio Journalism Awards" |
