= Jeffrey Blitz =

American film director, film producer and screenwriter

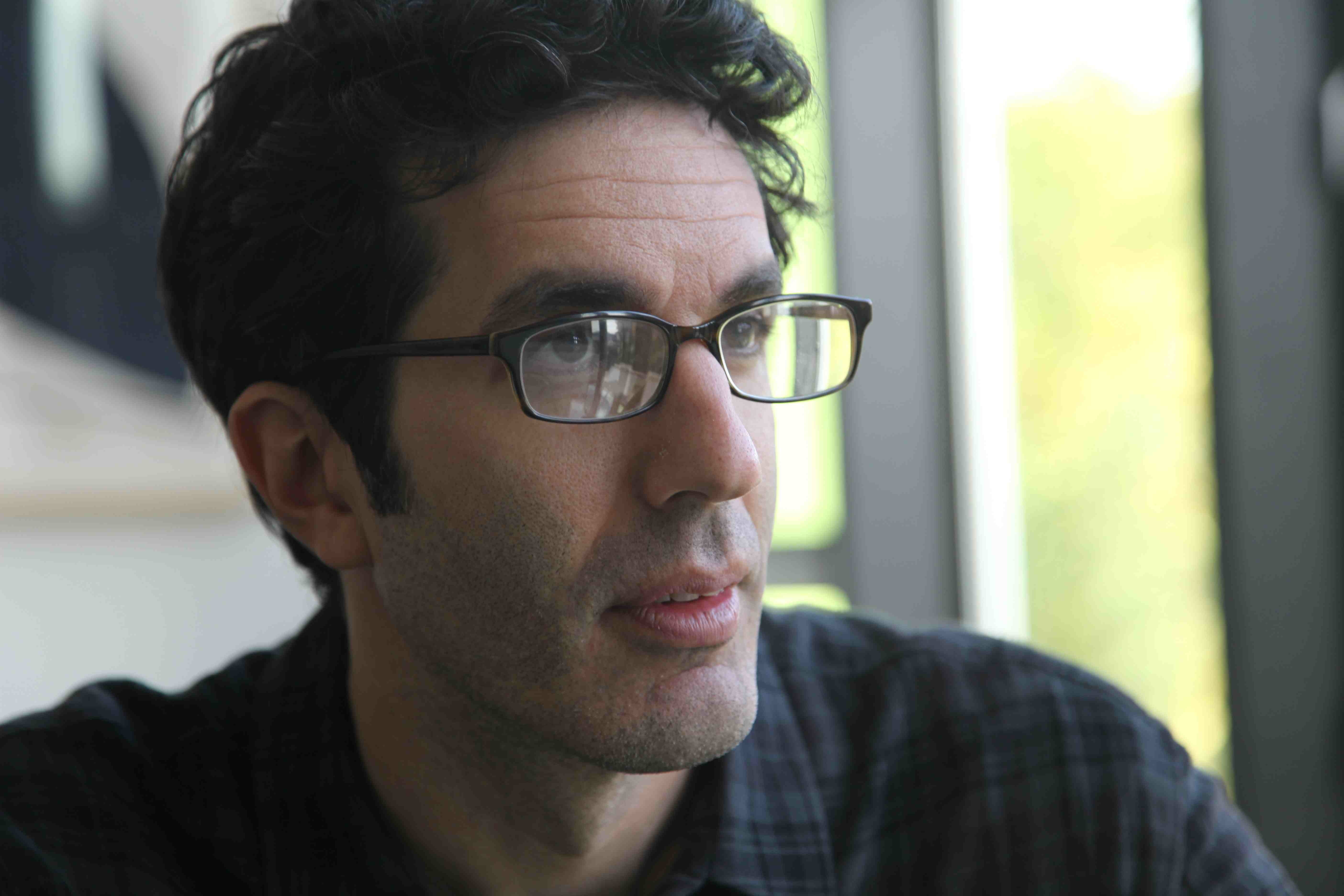
- Blitz in May 2011
- Education: B.A. and M.A. Johns Hopkins University
- Occupations: Film director, film producer, and screenwriter
- Family: Andy Blitz (brother)

Jeffrey Blitz is an American film director, screenwriter and producer best known for the documentary Spellbound (2003), The Office (2007 - 2010), the fiction film Rocket Science (2007) and Comedy Central’s Review (2014 - 2017). Blitz is a two-time Emmy Award winner, the winner of the Directing Prize at Sundance and an Academy Award nominee.

== Personal life ==
Blitz grew up in New York City and then New Jersey to an Argentinian mother and an American father. He is brother to comedian Andy Blitz and constitutional law scholar Marc Blitz.

While a student at Ridgewood High School in Ridgewood, New Jersey, Blitz worked to overcome his debilitating stutter by joining the speech and debate teams. He went on to win the New Jersey state championship in policy debate as well as multiple public speaking events. He has since become an outspoken advocate within the stuttering community.

Blitz attended Johns Hopkins as an undergrad and graduate student where he studied writing with John Barth and J. M. Coetzee. He was awarded the Louis Sudler Prize for the Arts there and went on to attended USC for graduate film school.

== Career ==
=== Spellbound ===
Blitz’s first work out of film school at USC was the documentary Spellbound that he directed and photographed. He produced the film with his friend Sean Welch who also did production audio. They co-financed the project on a dozen credit cards and later enlisted USC classmate Yana Gorskaya to edit. It was her first professional editing assignment and she and Blitz worked on the movie in the living room of his apartment. The film tracks eight teenagers on their quest to win the Scripps 1999 National Spelling Bee. The spellers were Harry Altman, Angela Arenivar, Ted Brigham, April DeGideo, Neil Kadakia, Nupur Lala, Emily Stagg, and Ashley White.

Spellbound received 17 awards and 19 nominations, including a nomination for the Academy Award for Best Documentary Feature and winning an Emmy Award for Outstanding Cultural & Artistic Programming (Blitz was also nominated for directing.) Yana Gorskaya's editing won the ACE Eddie award for best editing of documentary. It became an unexpected hit film at its first theatrical venue, the Film Forum in New York and went on to earn $5.8 million in the box office across the United States.

Kenneth Turan, the film critic for the Los Angeles Times said “Spellbound was one of the first unheralded documentaries to do well at the box office”. The films distributor THINKFilm noted “Spellbound was a milestone from which there would be no turning back”... “since then, the box office records for documentaries have been broken countless times”.

The film was included on several critics' Top 10 lists, including that of The New York Times. The publication described the film as a depiction of an American subculture and modern life.

In 2007, it was included as #4 of the "IDA's Top 25 Documentaries" of all-time by the members of the International Documentary Association.

Spellbound opened to positive reviews from critics. Rotten Tomatoes gives the film an approval rating of 97%, based on reviews from 139 critics, and an average rating of 8.27/10. The website's critical consensus states, "A suspenseful, gripping documentary that features an engaging cross section of American children”. The New York Times described “Blitz's real achievement, though -- what makes the last 40 minutes of ''Spellbound'' not only exciting but also tremendously moving -- is his attention to the contestants and their families.” While The Austin Chronicle described “as good, old-fashioned drama goes, it doesn't get much better than Spellbound”.

Spellbound was one of a number of documentaries that are credited with re-energizing the form. It has been cited as inspiration for a slew of competition documentaries that have followed in its wake. Smithsonian Magazine described how Spellbound “sparked a whole genre, a series of documentaries that followed its path”.

=== Rocket Science ===
Inspired by his own experience as a person who stutters, Blitz then wrote and directed dramatic feature film Rocket Science. Rocket Science tells the story of Hal Hefner, a fifteen-year-old stutterer who joins his school's debate team when he develops a crush on its star member. Speaking to The Stuttering Foundation, Blitz described one moment he kept in mind as he wrote the film: his first high school debate tournament. Blitz noted “I blocked on my very first word and stayed blocked on it for the entire 8 minutes I was allocated. I tried to never forget the frustration (and, in a dark way, the humor) of that moment”.

The film stars Anna Kendrick who earned an Independent Spirit Award nomination for Best Supporting Female.

Rocket Science premiered at Sundance Film Festival in 2007 where Blitz won the Dramatic Directing Prize. Rocket Science was also nominated for three Independent Spirit Awards including Best First Feature and Best First Screenplay.

Director Jason Reitman saw Rocket Science at Sundance while he was writing Up In The Air. He immediately began rewriting to include a part for Anna Kendrick based on her Rocket Science character.

Rotten Tomatoes gives the film 84% from 111 critic reviews, with the critics consensus stating, "Rocket Science is a quirky gem packed with brilliant indie charm carried along by a great narrative and an amazing soundtrack."

=== The Office ===
Blitz’s first directing work in scripted television was on The Office. In 2009, he won the Primetime Emmy for Outstanding Directing for a Comedy Series for his work on the episode Stress Relief. The episode featured one of the series most memorable cold opens in which Dwight stages a fake fire that leads to Stanley having a heart attack. In a desperate attempt to “Save Bandit” Angela launches her cat into the ceiling so Oscar could save her cat. On their podcast Office Ladies, Jenna Fischer and Angela Kinsey discuss how Blitz fought hard to have the moment where the cat goes up into the ceiling and then out a different part of the ceiling. Blitz was sure to thank the cat in his Emmy acceptance speech.

‘Stress Relief’ is credited with helping to save a life after an Arizona man, despite having no CPR training, managed to resuscitate a woman in medical distress by performing chest compressions to the cadence of “Stayin’ Alive” as he learned from the episodes CPR demonstration.

Blitz directed a total of 11 episodes of The Office over its nine season run.

=== Television Pilots/Series ===
==== Zach Stone is Gonna Be Famous ====
In 2013 Blitz directed the Pilot of Zach Stone is Gonna Be Famous. The series was created by and starred Bo Burnham in his first television series roll and was picked up by MTV for one season.

==== Review ====
From 2014 to 2017, Blitz was executive producer/director/writer of the Comedy Central series Review, which he co-adapted and was co-showrunner with Andy Daly whom he has known since high school in Ridgewood, New Jersey. Blitz directed the pilot and the entire three season run of the show. It was adapted from the Australian series Review with Myles Barlow.

Review was met with widespread critical acclaim. The New Yorker described it as an “agitating, legitimately funny, and surprisingly profound sitcom” while GQ called it “The funniest, bleakest, truest show you're not watching”.

Ahead of the DVD release of Review in 2020, Polygon declared “Review may just be one of the best TV shows ever made”. The Atlantic said “In an era of peak television that's expanded storytelling horizons beyond the formulaic, flooding the medium with characters that aren't traditionally likable, Andy Daly’s Review stands out”.

The series was listed in Indiewire’s The Best TV Shows of the Decade and The A.V. Club’s Best TV shows of 2017.

The episode Pancakes, Divorce, Pancakes featured Forest MacNeil (Andy Daly) eat 15 pancakes, get divorced, and then eat 30 pancakes. It was listed in multiple publications Top 10 episodes of the year for 2014, including The Atlantic, Indiewire and The Chicago Reader.

Review maintains cult status among fans as “one of the darkest comedies ever seen on television”.

==== Playing House ====
Blitz directed the pilot and two subsequent episodes of comedy series Playing House which was created by Lennon Parham and Jessica St. Clair who also star in the series. Running for three seasons from 2014 - 2017, Playing House achieved critical acclaim. Vulture declared it one of the best new shows of 2014 and included it in multiple best of lists while NY Times critic Margaret Lyons cited it in her list of Best Shows That Ended in 2017.

The series was described as “One of TV's Bravest Comedies” “Bingeworthy” and as the “Best TV Show About Female Friendships That You're Not Watching”. On Rotten Tomatoes Playing House has an approval rating of 90%.

==== Trial & Error ====
Across 2017 & 2018 Blitz produced and directed the pilot for the NBC sitcom Trial & Error starring John Lithgow in its first season and Kristin Chenoweth in its second. In addition to working as executive producer, Blitz directed a dozen episodes of the series across its two-season run. Trial & Error was also hailed as a cult favorite and likened to fan favourite Parks & Rec.

Vanity Fair said “Trial & Error derives its comedy from a magnetic combination of extreme silliness and highbrow allusion”. Variety called it “a lighthearted, zany spoof of shows like “The Jinx” and “Making a Murderer,” those true-crime documentary series that take a viewer into the real-time investigation of a convoluted cas. Indiewire described the series as “Unhinged at times, oddly thoughtful at others, Trial & Error is more than parody; it's a welcome wave of silliness”.

==== American Auto ====
Blitz directed and executive produced the pilot for American Auto in 2020, which was then picked up for series by NBC. The show stars Ana Gasteyer. On Rotten Tomatoes it has a 100% rating. Blitz went on to executive produce the first season and directed three more episodes including the season finale.

=== Additional Work ===
==== Small Plates ====
Blitz directed short documentary “Small Plates” for the NY Times in 2014. The film captures the experience of six second-graders in Brooklyn as they're treated to a seven-course tasting menu at Daniel and was listed in the Top 10 videos of the year for the NY Times website.

==== Table 19 ====
Table 19 is an American comedy film written and directed by Jeffrey Blitz, from a story originally written by Jay and Mark Duplass. It was released in 2017 and stars Anna Kendrick, Craig Robinson, June Squibb, Lisa Kudrow, Stephen Merchant, Wyatt Russell, and Tony Revolori.

On Metacritic, the film has a score of 40 out of 100, based on reviews from 29 critics, indicating "mixed or average reviews”.

==== Other Television Work ====
Blitz directed one episode of Season 1 of Upload, which was released on Amazon Prime in May 2020. In Season 2 he stepped into the Executive Producer role and directed 4 of the 7 episodes of this Greg Daniels series.

Blitz served as executive producer on Living With Yourself which premiered on Netflix in 2019.

Well established as a comedy director, Blitz has also helmed episodes of Parks and Recreation, Superstore, and Space Force.

In 2025, Blitz executive produced and directed the pilot for Peacock's Stumble, a mockumentary about the world of junior college cheer.

== Stuttering ==
In 2017, The Stuttering Association for the Young honored Blitz with the “Hero Award” for their 15th Anniversary Chef’s Gala. Because of his professional success, personal achievement and support of those who stutter, Jeffrey Blitz stands as a role model for the stuttering community.

Speaking to the Los Angeles Times about his film Rocket Science, Blitz said “Stuttering was the world’s way of telling me that I could not speak in public, and I was so [angry] about that as a kid that I wanted to do the one thing that the world was telling me I could not do,”. Upon getting blocked on a word, Blitz would turn the sentence around in his head searching for a synonym or good punch line to capture his thoughts. This struggle lead to an extensive vocabulary by necessity, and a penchant for finding absurd humor in mundane life, skills that would ultimately be a great foundation for writing and directing.

Speaking to The Stuttering Foundation in 2017, Blitz described his hope that children who stutter will persevere and gain the confidence he has acquired. “Stuttering makes you who you are and it can inspire some great things,” he says. “It's because of stuttering that I got involved in debate, that I developed a passion for words and reading, that I found myself drawn to the power of film. I am who I am because of my stuttering, and I'm finally very glad for that.”

== Filmography ==
Documentary film

Year	Title	Director	Writer	Producer
2002	Spellbound	Yes	Yes	Yes
2010	Lucky	Yes	Yes	No

Feature film

Year	Title	Director	Writer
2007	Rocket Science	Yes	Yes
2017	Table 19	Yes	Yes

Television

Year	Title	Director	Executive Producer	Notes
2006–2013	The Office	Yes	No	11 episodes
2009	Parks and Recreation	Yes	No	Episode: "The Reporter"
2013	Zach Stone Is Gonna Be Famous	Yes	No	Episode: "Pilot"
2014–2017	Review	Yes	Yes	Directed 22 episodes
2014–2017	Playing House	Yes	No	3 episodes
2017–2018	Trial & Error	Yes	Yes	Directed 12 episodes
2018	Ghosted	Yes	No	Episode: "The Wire"
2018–2019	Superstore	Yes	No	3 episodes
2019	Living With Yourself	No	Yes	
2019	Perfect Harmony	Yes	No	2 episodes
2019	Sunnyside	Yes	No	Episode: "Pants Full of Sandwiches"
2020	Single Parents	Yes	No	Episode: "Chez Second Grade"
2020	Space Force	Yes	No	Episode: "Edison Jaymes"
2020–2025	Upload	Yes	Yes	Directed 9 episodes
2021–2023	American Auto	Yes	Yes	Directed 5 episodes
2025	St. Denis Medical	Yes	No	Episode: "This Place Is Our Everything"
2025	The Paper	Yes	No	Episode: "The Ohio Journalism Awards"
2025-2026	Stumble	Yes	Yes	Directed 7 episodes

== Awards ==
Blitz is among the Notable Alumni of graduates from Johns Hopkins University and USC School of Cinematic Arts.

=== Major Award Bodies ===
Year	Awarded By	Category/Award	Work	Result	Ref.
2003	Academy Awards	Best Documentary, Features	Spellbound	Nominee	
2004	News & Documentary Emmy Awards	Outstanding Cultural & Artistic Programming - Long Form	Spellbound	Winner	
2004	News & Documentary Emmy Awards	Outstanding Individual Achievement in a Craft: Direction	Spellbound	Nominee	
2009	Primetime Emmy Awards	Outstanding Directing for a Comedy Series	The Office: "Stress Relief"	Winner	

=== Other Awards ===
Year	Awarded By	Category/Award	Work	Result
2002	Cleveland International Film Festival	Best Film	Spellbound	Winner
2002	Hawaii International Film Festival	Golden Maile Award	Spellbound	Winner
2002	International Documentary Association	Feature Documentaries	Spellbound	Nominee
2002	Los Angeles IFP/West Film Festival	Special Jury Prize	Spellbound	Winner
2002	Los Angeles IFP/West Film Festival	Audience Award - Best Documentary	Spellbound	Winner
2002	SXSW Film Festival	SXSW Competition Award - Documentary Feature	Spellbound	Winner
2002	Tribeca Film Festival	Jury Award - Best Documentary Feature	Spellbound	Nominee
2002	Woodstock Film Festival	Jury Prize - Best Documentary	Spellbound	Winner
2002	Awards Circuit Community Awards	Best Documentary Feature	Spellbound	Nominee
2002	Utah Film Critics Association Awards	Best Documentary Feature Film	Spellbound	Nominee
2003	Durango Film Festival	Filmmakers Award	Spellbound	Winner
2003	Durango Film Festival	Audience Award	Spellbound	Winner
2003	Film Independent Spirit Awards	Truer Than Fiction Award	Spellbound	Nominee
2003	Melbourne International Film Festival	Most Popular Documentary	Spellbound	Winner
2003	Santa Barbara International Film Festival	Best Documentary Film	Spellbound	Winner
2003	Sarasota Film Festival	Best Documentary	Spellbound	Winner
2003	Seattle Film Critics Awards	Best Documentary	Spellbound	Nominee
2003	Sydney Film Festival	Audience Award - Best Documentary	Spellbound	Winner
2003	National Board of Review, USA	Top Five Documentaries	Spellbound	Winner
2003	Village Voice Film Poll	Best Documentary	Spellbound	Nominee
2004	Central Ohio Film Critics Association	Best Documentary	Spellbound	Nominee
2004	Chicago Film Critics Association Awards	Best Documentary	Spellbound	Nominee
2004	Online Film & Television Association	Best Documentary Picture	Spellbound	Nominee
2004	Online Film Critics Society Awards	Best Documentary	Spellbound	Nominee
2004	Chlotrudis Awards	Best Movie	Spellbound	Nominee
2004	Chlotrudis Awards	Best Documentary	Spellbound	Nominee
2004	Gold Derby Awards	Documentary Feature	Spellbound	Nominee
2004	Golden Trailer Awards	Best Documentary	Spellbound	Winner
2004	International Cinephile Society Awards	Best Documentary	Spellbound	Winner
2004	National Society of Film Critics Awards, USA	Best Non-Fiction Film	Spellbound	Nominee
2005	Satellite Awards	Best Documentary DVD	Spellbound	Nominee
2007	Sundance Film Festival	Directing Award - Dramatic	Rocket Science	Winner
2007	Sundance Film Festival	Grand Jury Prize - Dramatic	Rocket Science	Nominee
2007	Deauville Film Festival	Revelations Prize	Rocket Science	Winner
2007	Deauville Film Festival	Grand Special Prize	Rocket Science	Nominee
2008	Film Independent Spirit Awards	Best First Feature	Rocket Science	Nominee
2008	Film Independent Spirit Awards	Best First Screenplay	Rocket Science	Nominee
2009	Gold Derby Awards	Gold Derby TV Award - Comedy Episode of the Year	The Office: Stress Relief	Winner
