= Owen Daniels =

Owen Daniels may refer to:

- Owen Daniels (American football) (born 1982), American football tight end
- Owen Daniels (actor), American actor and television writer
- Owen Daniels (Brookside), a fictional character

== See also ==
- Owen Daniel (1875–1936), Australian politician; member of the Queensland Legislative Assembly
