= Deedle-Dee Productions =

American television production company

- Deedle-Dee Productions' closing logo, as seen on Parks and Recreation
- Type: Private
- Industry: Television production
- Founded: 1997; 29 years ago
- Founder: Greg Daniels
- Headquarters: United States
- Products: King of the Hill; The Office; Parks and Recreation

Deedle-Dee Productions is an American television production company founded by Greg Daniels in 1997. It is known for producing the series King of the Hill, The Office, and Parks and Recreation.

== Logo ==
The company's logo is a blue screen with the company name written in fluorescent-colored letters (occasionally, the logo would be a black screen with the company name written in fluorescent-colored letters surrounded by similarly colored circles). These were drawn by Daniels' daughter Haley.

== Filmography ==
=== Television series ===
| Title | Creator(s) | Years active | Network | Notes | Seasons | Episodes |
|---|---|---|---|---|---|---|
| King of the Hill | Mike Judge; Greg Daniels | 1997–2010; 2025–present | Fox (1997–2009); First-run syndication (2010); Hulu (2025–present) | Co-production with Judgmental Films, Bandera Entertainment, 3 Arts Entertainment, 20th Century Fox Television, and 20th Television Animation | 14 | 269 |
| The Office | Greg Daniels | 2005–2013 | NBC | Co-production with Shine America, 3 Arts Entertainment (uncredited) and Universal Television | 9 | 201 |
| Parks and Recreation | Greg Daniels; Michael Schur | 2009–2015; 2020 | NBC | Co-production with Open 4 Business Productions, Fremulon, 3 Arts Entertainment and Universal Television | 7 | 125 (and 1 special) |
| People of Earth | David Jenkins | 2016–2017 | TBS | Co-production with Conaco and Warner Horizon Television | 2 | 20 |
| Upload | Greg Daniels | 2020–2025 | Amazon Prime Video | Co-production with 3 Arts Entertainment, Reunion Pacific Entertainment and Amazon Studios | 4 | 29 |
| Space Force | Steve Carell; Greg Daniels | 2020–2022 | Netflix | Co-production with Film Flam and 3 Arts Entertainment | 2 | 17 |
| The Paper | Greg Daniels; Michael Koman | 2025–present | Peacock | Co-production with W.D.M. Productions, 3 Arts Entertainment, Banijay Americas and Universal Television | 2 | 20 |

== See also ==
- Bandera Entertainment
