= Clayton Snyder =

American actor (born 1987)

- Born: Clayton Travis Snyder; September 9, 1987 (age 38); Long Beach, California, U.S.
- Education: Pepperdine University
- Occupation: Actor
- Years active: 2000–present
- Spouse: Allegra Edwards (m. 2020)
- Children: 1

Clayton Travis Snyder (born September 9, 1987) is an American actor. He played as Ethan Craft on the Disney Channel series Lizzie McGuire (2001–2004) and in its 2003 film adaptation, The Lizzie McGuire Movie.

== Biography ==
Clayton Snyder was born in Long Beach, California to Steve and Glenda Snyder. He is of German and Italian descent, and has two older half-brothers, Doug and Devin. Snyder graduated from Los Alamitos High School in Los Alamitos, California as senior class vice-president in June 2006. He then attended Pepperdine University and was a member of the water polo team from 2006 to 2009, earned All-America Honorable Mention as a senior in 2009, and graduated in 2010 with a BA in Film Studies. Snyder married Allegra Edwards in 2020 and they have a son.

== Filmography ==
Film
Year	Title	Role	Notes
2003	The Lizzie McGuire Movie	Ethan Craft	
2010	Life Is Not a Musical: The Musical	Carson	
2014	Foam Wars: Maximum Plastic	Nick Saunder	Short film
2014	Confrontation	Jones	Short film
2014	Hide Me Too	Clayton	Short film
2014	Invitation	Mark	Short film
2014	Breathe	Husband	Short film
2014	The Manocle	Hunky boyfriend	Short film
2014	The Strongest Drug	Tommy Carter	Short film
2014	College Carnage		Short film
2015	Sneezy G	Nate	Short film
2015	The Truth About Autocorrect	Jeremy	Video short
2015	Still in San Pedro	Francis	Short film
2016	The Incarnation	William	Short film
2016	My Friend Violet	David	
2016	Game Night	Hunter	Short film
2016	What Happened Last Night	Danny Barker	
2016	We Can't Die	Eli James	Short film
2017	The Reunion	Paul Stark	
2017	Instructions for Living	Joe	
2018	Hide in the Light	Ryan	
2018	Her Side of the Bed	Ernest	
2018	Save the First Dance		Short film, completed
2018	Close to Home	Sam	Short film, completed
2019	Ham on Rye	Stoned Uno	
2019	Alien Warfare	Mike	
2019	Angel of Death	Marcus	Short film, completed
2019	Destination: Christmas	Daryl Foster	post-production

Television
Year	Title	Role	Notes
2001–04	Lizzie McGuire	Ethan Craft	31 episodes
2014	NCIS	Sampson	Episode: "Page Not Found"
2015	CollegeHumor's Comedy Music Hall of Fame	Mountie - 'Canada'	Television Film
2017	Dream Job	Aaron	Television Film, completed

Web
Year	Title	Role	Notes
2014	Famous in Flagstaff	Bruce	Episode: "Pilot"
2014	My Olde Roommate	Stevo Snajper	Episode: "Serbian Waterpolo"
2014	Comedy Corner	James	Episode: "Don't Like Boats"
2014	Rules of Engagement	Detective Lucen	Episode: "They're All Gone"
2014	One and Only	Representative Mike Howell	Episode: "The Indictment"
2012-2015	Hit Women	Rick Good	3 Episodes
2015	Quirky Female Protagonist	Platonic Male Friend	2 Episodes
2016	Second Star	Lucas Davis	Episode: "The Second Star"
2016	Edgar Allan Poe's Murder Mystery Dinner Party	Fyodor Dostoevsky	YouTube series, 7 episodes
2017	Mondays	Jordan	5 Episodes
2018	Super Single	Chase	3 Episodes
2018	New Dogs, Old Tricks	Danny	12 Episodes
2020	Wayward Guide for the Untrained Eye	Vern Marrow	YouTube series
