= Briarpatch (TV series) =

American anthology series

- Genre: Drama
- Created by: Andy Greenwald
- Based on: Briarpatch by Ross Thomas
- Starring: Rosario Dawson; Jay R. Ferguson; Edi Gathegi; Brian Geraghty; Kim Dickens
- Composer: Giancarlo Vulcano
- Country of origin: United States
- Original language: English
- No. of seasons: 1
- No. of episodes: 10

Production
- Executive producers: Andy Greenwald; Sam Esmail; Chad Hamilton; Ana Lily Amirpour (pilot)
- Producer: Rosario Dawson
- Production companies: Voodoo, Ltd.; Esmail Corp; Anonymous Content; Paramount Television Studios; Universal Content Productions

Original release
- Network: USA Network
- Release: February 6 – April 13, 2020

Briarpatch is an American television series starring Rosario Dawson based on the 1984 Ross Thomas novel of the same name. The series was picked up in late January 2019 by USA Network, after being ordered to pilot in April 2018.

In advance of its broadcast premiere, several episodes of the series received a preview screening in the Primetime program of the 2019 Toronto International Film Festival.

The series premiered on February 6, 2020. On July 17, 2020, the series was canceled after one season.

== Premise ==
When Detective Felicity Dill is killed in a car bombing, her sister Allegra Dill, an investigator working for a senator, returns home to San Bonifacio to find her killer. In the process of her investigation, she uncovers a web of corruption in the small Texas town.

== Cast ==
=== Main ===
- Rosario Dawson as Allegra "Pick" Dill
- Jay R. Ferguson as Jake Spivey
- Edi Gathegi as A.D. Singe
- Brian Geraghty as Captain Gene Colder
- Kim Dickens as Eve Raytek

=== Recurring ===
- Charles Parnell as Cyrus Lapin
- Allegra Edwards as Cindy McCabe
- Kirk Fox as Sid
- Enrique Murciano as Senator Joseph Ramirez
- John Aylward as Freddie Laffter
- Timm Sharp as Harold Snow
- Christine Woods as Lucretia Colder
- Susan Park as Daphne Owens
- Alan Cumming as Clyde Brattle
- Mel Rodriguez as Mayor Tony Salazar
- David Paymer as Jimmy Jr.
- Ed Asner as James Staghorne Sr.
- Michele Weaver as Felicity Dill

== Episodes ==
No.	Title	Directed by	Written by	Original release date	U.S viewers (millions)
1	"First Time in Saint Disgrace"	Ana Lily Amirpour	Andy Greenwald	February 6, 2020	0.528
Allegra Dill returns to her hometown of San Bonifacio, Texas, following the death of her sister, Felicity, who died in a car bombing. A.D. Singe, a lawyer and a friend of Felicity, says she named Allegra as beneficiary of a sizable insurance policy. Chief of Detectives Strucker and Captain Colder offer condolences but deny her entry into an expensive rental property that Felicity owned, despite her having very little in a checking account. Colder also confides that he and Felicity were to marry after his pending divorce. Allegra sneaks into the residence her sister was said to have lived in, only to find nothing too personal of Felicity's. Strucker offers to take her to the actual residence, but he is also targeted with a car bomb.
2	"Snap, Crackle, Pop"	Steven Piet	Andy Greenwald	February 13, 2020	0.357
3	"Terrible, Shocking Things"	Steven Piet	Eva Anderson	February 24, 2020	0.582
4	"Breadknife Weather"	Desiree Akhavan	Wei-Ning Yu	March 2, 2020	0.627
5	"Behind God's Back"	Colin Bucksey	Haley Harris	March 9, 2020	0.433
6	"The Most Sinful Mf-er Alive"	Colin Bucksey	Rayna McClendon	March 16, 2020	0.515
7	"Butterscotch"	Samira Radsi	Aisha Porter-Christie	March 23, 2020	0.457
8	"Most Likely to Succeed"	Jessica Lowrey	Teleplay by : Eva Anderson; Story by : Jay Franklin	March 30, 2020	0.437
9	"Game Theory and Mescaline"	Arkasha Stevenson	Brian C. Brown	April 6, 2020	0.485
10	"Felicity"	Steven Piet	Andy Greenwald	April 13, 2020	0.449

== Reception ==
Briarpatch has received a Metacritic score of 66 based on 15 critics, indicating "generally favorable" reviews. Rotten Tomatoes gave an approval rating of 76% based on 25 critics, its consensus reads: "Briarpatch's ambiance is at times more intriguing than the simmering mystery at its center, but a captivating Rosario Dawson and surreal setting ensure it's never less than watchable."
