= Bandera Entertainment =

American animation studio

- Bandera Entertainment's closing logo, as seen on Praise Petey
- Type: Private
- Industry: Animation
- Founded: January 2019; 7 years ago
- Founder: Mike Judge; Greg Daniels
- Headquarters: Los Angeles, California, U.S.
- Key people: Dustin Davis (president)
- Products: Television series
- Website: www.banderaentertainment.com

Bandera Entertainment (credited on-screen simply as Bandera) is an American animation studio founded by King of the Hill creators, Mike Judge and Greg Daniels, in January 2019, and based in Los Angeles, California. The studio's president is currently Dustin Davis, the former head of YouTube Originals.

== History ==
It was revealed on January 18, 2022 that Mike Judge and Greg Daniels, the two of which previously co-created the adult animated series King of the Hill, had founded an animation studio together known as "Bandera Entertainment", with a revival of King of the Hill being one of several series in development, and partnered with Dustin Davis, the former head of YouTube Originals. Previous reunion panels for the series were also said to have inspired the duo to create the studio. Daniels stated that the studio is trying to "get us in more of a supervisory goal" as well as "and trying to help other people achieve their visions", with Judge also noting that while he may co-create some of the programming, he reiterated that the studio's main focus is to mentor others.

Asked if some of his pet peeves played a part in his decision to form Bandera in an interview with The New Yorker, Judge replied that he had seen animation "done wrong so many times", as for instance, there were "many failed versions" in which they have a "celebrity doing a voice, combined with a good animation company", but "they don’t really fit together."

== Filmography ==
=== Television series ===
==== 2020s ====
Title	Year(s)	Creator(s)	Network	Notes
Praise Petey	2023	Anna Drezen	Freeform	Co-production with Gorgeous Horse, The Monica Padrick Company, ShadowMachine and 20th Television Animation
In the Know	2024	Zach Woods; Brandon Gardner; Mike Judge	Peacock	Co-production with ShadowMachine and Universal Television
Exploding Kittens	2024	Matthew Inman; Shane Kosakowski	Netflix	Loosely based on the tabletop card game of the same name by Matthew Inman and Elan Lee; co-production with Chomp City, Jam Filled Entertainment and Chernin Entertainment
Common Side Effects	2025–present	Joe Bennett; Steve Hely	Adult Swim	Co-production with Green Street Pictures, Tell Me More and Williams Street
King of the Hill	2025–present	Mike Judge; Greg Daniels	Hulu	Seasons 14–15 only; co-production with Deedle-Dee Productions, Judgmental Films, 3 Arts Entertainment and 20th Television Animation

===== Undated =====
Title	Year(s)	Creator(s)	Network	Notes
Chelm: The Smartest Place on Earth	TBA	Sacha Baron Cohen; Greg Daniels	Cartoon Network; HBO Max	
Best Buds	TBA	Caleb Hearon; Caitie Delaney	Peacock	Co-production with Universal Television
Bad Crimes	TBA	Nicole Silverberg	TBA	Initially picked up by Netflix, but later scrapped; currently being shopped around to other networks
Dykes to Watch Out For	TBA	TBA	TBA	Based on the comic strip of the same name by Alison Bechdel

== See also ==
- Judgmental Films
- Deedle-Dee Productions
