= Jaren Lewison =

American actor

- Born: December 9, 2000 (age 25); Dallas, Texas, U.S.
- Education: University of Southern California (BA)
- Occupation: Actor
- Known for: Ben Gross in Never Have I Ever

Jaren Miles Lewison (born December 9, 2000) is an American actor. He is best known for portraying Ben Gross in the television series Never Have I Ever.

== Early life and education ==
Jaren Lewison was born on December 9, 2000. He grew up in Dallas, Texas, in a Jewish family. He has one sister named Mikayla.

For 14 years, he attended Levine Academy, a Conservative Jewish day school. He attended JJ Pearce Highschool in Richardson Texas.

In 2019, Lewison began attending college at the University of Southern California, where he graduated in 2022 with a bachelor's degree in psychology with minors in forensics and criminology. He filmed Never Have I Ever while being a full-time student at USC.

== Acting career ==
His most notable role to date is in the main cast of Lang Fisher and Mindy Kaling's Netflix show, Never Have I Ever, as Ben Gross. He had a recurring role as Joshua in the children's television series Barney & Friends from 2008 to 2009 as well as in a 2011 Christmas special, and he portrayed Young Robert in the TV series Lone Star in 2010. In 2012, he starred as Roman DiRizzo in the TV movie Bad Fairy, and in 2015, he appeared as Kyle Peterson in the TV movie Away and Back. In 2026, he joined the main cast of the CBS sitcom Eternally Yours.

== Filmography ==
=== Television ===
Year	Title	Role	Notes
2008–2009	Barney & Friends	Joshua	4 episodes
2010	Lone Star	Young Robert	Episode: "Pilot"
2012	Bad Fairy	Roman DiRizzo	TV movie
2015	Away and Back	Kyle Peterson	TV movie
2020–2023	Never Have I Ever	Ben Gross	Main cast; 37 episodes
2026	Eternally Yours	Max Marshall	Main cast

=== Film ===
Year	Title	Role
2011	Barney: A Very Merry Christmas: The Movie	Joshua
2014	Men, Women & Children	Jack Truby
2015	Beyond the Farthest Star	Young Adam
2015	A Horse Tale	Jackson
2018	Tag	18-Year-Old Hoagie
2019	90 Feet from Home	Young Tommy

== Nominations ==
Year	Awards	Category	Work
2021	MTV Movie & TV Awards	Best Kiss (with Maitreyi Ramakrishnan)	Never Have I Ever
