= Space Force (TV series) =

American television series

- Promotional release poster
- Genre: Workplace comedy; Military fiction
- Created by: Steve Carell; Greg Daniels
- Showrunner: Greg Daniels
- Starring: Steve Carell; John Malkovich; Ben Schwartz; Diana Silvers; Tawny Newsome; Jimmy O. Yang; Don Lake
- Music by: Carter Burwell
- Country of origin: United States
- Original language: English
- No. of seasons: 2
- No. of episodes: 17

Production
- Executive producers: Greg Daniels; Steve Carell; Howard Klein; Brent Forrester; Paul King
- Producers: Caroline James; Lauren Houseman; Michael Maccarone
- Cinematography: Simon Chapman
- Editors: David Rogers; Susan Vaill
- Camera setup: Single-camera
- Running time: 27–36 minutes
- Production companies: Deedle-Dee Productions; Film Flam; 3 Arts Entertainment

Original release
- Network: Netflix
- Release: May 29, 2020 – February 18, 2022

Space Force is an American workplace comedy television series created by Greg Daniels and Steve Carell for Netflix. It centers on a group of people tasked with establishing the sixth branch of the United States Armed Forces, the United States Space Force. It stars Steve Carell, John Malkovich, Ben Schwartz, Diana Silvers, Lisa Kudrow, Tawny Newsome and Jimmy O. Yang. It premiered on Netflix on May 29, 2020, to mixed reviews. In November 2020, it was renewed for a second season which premiered on February 18, 2022, to generally favorable reviews. In April 2022, the series was cancelled after two seasons.

== Premise ==
Space Force is a workplace comedy-drama series that centers on a group of people tasked with establishing the sixth branch of the United States Armed Forces, the United States Space Force. Season One follows the efforts of General Mark Naird (Carell) to get "boots on the Moon" by 2024, per the president's orders.

== Cast and characters ==
=== Main ===
- Steve Carell as General Mark R. Naird, the Space Force's first Chief of Space Operations
- John Malkovich as Dr. Adrian Mallory, Space Force chief scientist
- Ben Schwartz as F. Tony Scarapiducci, Space Force social media director
- Diana Silvers as Erin Naird, Mark's teenage daughter
- Tawny Newsome as Captain Angela Ali, a Space Force helicopter pilot, and later, astronaut. In the final minutes of the last episode of season 2, she is promoted to major.
- Jimmy O. Yang as Dr. Chan Kaifang, Dr. Mallory's lead assistant (season 2; recurring season 1)
- Don Lake as Brigadier General Bradley Gregory, Naird's executive officer (season 2; recurring season 1)

=== Recurring ===
==== Military ====
- Noah Emmerich as General Kick Grabaston, Chief of Staff of the United States Air Force
- Alexey Vorobyov (credited as Alex Sparrow) as Captain Yuri "Bobby" Telatovich (Russian: Юрий «Бобби» Телатович, romanized: Yuriy «Bobbi» Telatovich), a Russian Space Forces liaison with the Space Force, spy, and illegitimate son of Vladimir Putin
- Roy Wood Jr. as Colonel Bert Mellows, U.S. Army liaison to the Space Force
- Jane Lynch as Admiral Mayweather, Chief of Naval Operations
- Diedrich Bader as General Rongley, Chief of Staff of the United States Army
- Patrick Warburton as General Dabney Stramm, Commandant of the Marine Corps
- Larry Joe Campbell as Admiral Louis Biffoont, Commandant of the Coast Guard
- Spencer House as Duncan Tabner, a Space Force security guard from Alabama
- Jamison Webb as Major Lee Baxter
- Brandon Molale as Captain Clarke Luffinch, USAF

==== Politicians ====
- Dan Bakkedahl as John Blandsmith, Secretary of Defense (Season 1)
- Ginger Gonzaga as Anabela Ysidro-Campos, credited and referred to as "the Angry Young Congresswoman" and also known as AYC, a parody of Alexandria Ocasio-Cortez
- Concetta Tomei as Representative Pitosi, a parody of Speaker of the House Nancy Pelosi
- Alan Blumenfeld as Senator Schugler, a parody of Senate Majority Leader Chuck Schumer
- Tim Meadows as Secretary of Defense (Season 2)

==== Scientists ====
- Jessica St. Clair as Kelly King, structural engineer and civil contractor
- Thomas Ohrstrom as Dr. Vandeveld, an ESA representative from Belgium
- Nancy Lantis as Dr. Wolf, a Canadian scientist
- Punam Patel as Dr. Ranatunga
- JayR Tinaco as Dr. Xyler

==== Family ====
- Fred Willard as Fred Naird, Mark's father (season 1)
- Lisa Kudrow as Maggie Naird, Mark's wife

==== Other ====
- Chris Gethard as Eddie Broser
- Landon Ashworth as Gabe Eli
- Owen Daniels as Obie Hanrahan
- Aparna Nancherla as Pella Bhat
- Hector Duran as Julio Díaz-José
- Carolyn Wilson as Louise Papaleo
- Vivis Colombetti as Hilde
- Amanda Lund as Anna
- Marc Sully Saint-Fleur as Jean Baptiste Bosou
- Scott Michael Morgan as Emmett Bunyan

=== Guest ===
- Rahul Nath as Dr. Chandreshekar
- Tommy Cook as Representative Bob White
- Asif Ali as Captain Dave Powers, USSF
- Michael Hitchcock as Jerome Lalosz
- Alice Wetterlund as Major Jane Pike, USSF
- Punkie Johnson as Staff Sergeant Kiki Rhodes, USSF
- Kaitlin Olson as Edison Jaymes, "an Elizabeth Holmes-esque tech wiz"
- Janina Gavankar as Hannah Howard, Jaymes' social media manager
- Bruce Locke as General Tsengjun, a Chinese general in the People's Liberation Army
- Kelvin Han Yee as General Gao Xiaoling (Chinese: 高孝玲; pinyin: Gāo Xiàolíng), a Chinese general in the People's Liberation Army and the commander of People's Liberation Army Strategic Support Force
- Megan Grano as Reporter No. 2 (Meredith)
- Jessica McKenna as Participant No. 2
- Patton Oswalt as Captain Lancaster, an astronaut stationed in space (season 2)
- Terry Crews as General Aggroad, the new Air Force Chief of Staff (season 2)
- Tim Chiou as Dr. Lim, a Chinese astronaut (season 2)
- Richard Ouyang as Dr. Zhang, Chinese chief scientist

== Episodes ==
Season	Episodes	Originally released
1	10	May 29, 2020
2	7	February 18, 2022

=== Season 1 (2020) ===
No. overall	No. in season	Title	Directed by	Written by	Original release date
1	1	"The Launch"	Paul King	Steve Carell & Greg Daniels	May 29, 2020
Air Force Lieutenant General Mark Naird is promoted to full four-star general and is hoping to take over as the Chief of Staff of the Air Force. But he is appointed as the first Chief of Operations of the newest United States military branch: the United States Space Force, which has branched from the Air Force, led by his rival, General Kick Grabaston. His family, including daughter Erin and wife Maggie, are relocated to Wild Horse, Colorado so that he can work at the new base there. One year later, the Space Force is about to launch a new satellite called Epsilon 6 into orbit. The Space Force is disorganized and fledgling, Mark is constantly bombarded by obstacles and adversaries, Erin detests her new home, and Maggie is now in prison. Against the advice of his advisors and scientists, including Space Force scientist Dr. Adrian Mallory, Mark orders the launch of Epsilon 6. Despite initial concerns, and in front of a delegation of prominent members of Congress, Epsilon 6 successfully reaches orbit. Later that night, as Mark and Adrian celebrate, Mark, observing Epsilon 6 through a telescope, sees a massive Chinese spacecraft intentionally clip the solar panels, the satellite's only power source, putting Epsilon 6 in jeopardy.
2	2	"Save Epsilon 6!"	Tom Marshall	Greg Daniels	May 29, 2020
After the solar panels were removed from Epsilon 6, Mark and Adrian try to come up with a plan to reattach the solar panels to the Epsilon 6 spacecraft before their different orbital trajectories take them too far apart. Despite other proposals from his science team, Mark decides to use a chimpanzee, Marcus, and a dog, Theodore, who were in orbit for a promotional mission. After negotiating with Marcus, they convince him to conduct an extravehicular activity to reattach the solar panels, but he is unsuccessful and breaks the tether to his spacecraft, flinging him far away. Marcus is recovered by a Chinese spacecraft. They try to get Theodore to finish the repairs only to discover that Marcus had eaten Theodore some time ago. Mark attempts to resign from his position, but that is denied by the Secretary of Defense.
3	3	"Mark and Mallory Go to Washington"	Tom Marshall	Shepard Boucher	May 29, 2020
Mark and Adrian travel to Washington, D.C. to present the case for the Space Force budget to the House Armed Services Committee. Erin is suspended from school and attempts to travel with her father back to Washington, D.C., but he has Angela watch her for the day instead. Mark requests an increased Space Force budget before Congress, while Grabaston attempts to convince Adrian to betray Mark so that the Air Force can re-absorb the Space Force. Adrian argues on behalf of Mark's goal of the increased militarization of space, while Mark argues for the scientific advancements that space exploration offers – the other's specialities. Satisfied by their answers, the committee dismisses the Space Force representatives from the hearing and simultaneously begins to investigate inflated Air Force budgets, to Grabaston's dismay.
4	4	"Lunar Habitat"	Paul King	Lauren Houseman	May 29, 2020
One of the participants in a 2-year experiment on a mock lunar habitat leaves before the end of the experiment. Not wanting to waste the experiment, Mark volunteers to join the team for the one remaining week. He struggles to befriend the other participants and refuses to acknowledge his personal stresses. After he stubbornly goes on a run and passes out, Mark is rescued by the other participants, with whom he finally connects. With her father away, Erin attempts to throw a party but is disappointed when none of her invited guests show up. She visits Maggie in prison, who tells her that her father is struggling and that he needs her support. The First Lady of the United States designs new ostentatious uniforms for the Space Force, and F. Tony encourages her Chief of Staff to send them over the objections of Brad. With the experiment over, Mark gets rid of the new uniforms and returns home.
5	5	"Space Flag"	Dee Rees	Brent Forrester	May 29, 2020
The Space Force and the Air Force are competing in Space Flag, with this specific exercise primarily focused on lunar combat. Each team is equipped with powered exoskeleton prototypes to test their effectiveness in recovering equipment from a dead spaceman. Adrian does not support Space Flag, as he argues that it is not properly testing the Space Force and that space warfare violates the morals of space travel; his exoskeleton selection offers limited mobility compared to the Air Force's exoskeleton, causing Mark to believe that he is trying to sabotage the exercise. Throughout most of the exercise, the Air Force team, led personally by Grabaston defeats all of the Space Force team except Mark. Adrian electronically interferes with the Air Force exoskeletons, allowing Mark to defeat the remaining team and win the exercise for the Space Force.
6	6	"The Spy"	Dee Rees	Aasia Lashay Bullock & Connor Hines	May 29, 2020
Mark is planning to visit Maggie in prison for a conjugal visit but is interrupted when India launches a rocket that appears to use stolen US technology. Suspecting there is a spy, Mark organizes a search to find potential leaks within the Space Force. After determining that Chan, Kelly, and Bobby are not spies, he suspects that Adrian is the spy after finding he had sent an encrypted e-mail. Mark publicly decrypts the file to find a video that Adrian had sent to Jerome, one of the lunar habitat participants, to express his love. Mark receives a call from the Secretary of Defense, who explains there was no spy, and India had developed the technology on its own.
7	7	"Edison Jaymes"	Jeff Blitz	Yael Green	May 29, 2020
The president of the United States directs that the Space Force contract its rocket fuel from Edison Jaymes, a successful tech entrepreneur. She meets with Mark and demonstrates the positive environmental impact of her improved rocket fuel, Skinny Fuel, but F. Tony learns from his hated counterpart working for Jaymes that it will not work as planned. Mark covertly changes the rocket fuel for the launch of the Prospector satellite from Skinny Fuel back to the original formula, resulting in a successful launch while still publicizing Jaymes's company. In return, he requests that she inform the president that no private companies are needed for the Space Force. Once it is established in a lunar orbit, the Prospector satellite returns images from the surface, revealing a Chinese base.
8	8	"Conjugal Visit"	David Rogers	Maxwell Theodore Vivian	May 29, 2020
Mark and Erin go to the prison to visit Maggie. Mark states that he would like alone time with Maggie and leaves Erin by the helicopter, where she begins speaking with some of the inmates about her mother. Much to Mark's disappointment, Maggie tells him that she would like for them to have an open marriage, as she is unsatisfied by the relatively few times that they can see each other. After the visit is done, Mark flies home but leaves Erin at the prison. Chan drives Angela to Denver to get LASIK, and they form a friendship. Adrian, F. Tony, and Brad search for candidates to work on the upcoming lunar habitat, and interview the money seeking Gabe Eli (Landon Ashworth), who gets into a shouting match with Dr. Mallory but ultimately select the badly inexperienced Eddie and Pella.
9	9	"It's Good to Be Back on the Moon"	Daina Reid	Paul Lieberstein	May 29, 2020
The Space Force One rocket carrying the habitat and crew achieves liftoff and orbit, but before they land the Chinese establish the Mare Tranquillitatis – Space Force One's landing site – as a 'territory of scientific research'. Adrian and Mark attempt to negotiate with their Chinese counterparts, but the negotiations fail badly, causing an outraged Adrian to consider war. Eddie's former criminal record is also revealed by the press. Space Force One lands, becoming Habitat One, and Angela walks on the Moon, intending to say, "It's good to be back on the Moon" as her memorable line, but she accidentally says, "It's good to be black on the Moon." The crew of Habitat One celebrates, but the victory is premature when Space Force is horrified by the discovery that a Chinese rover has deliberately rolled over the Lunar Flag Assembly planted by Apollo 11. Meanwhile, Erin discovers that Mark has been dating Kelly, and when she informs Maggie, the latter reveals that she, too, is dating Louise, a prison guard, to Erin's fury.
10	10	"Proportionate Response"	Daina Reid	Greg Daniels	May 29, 2020
The Joint Chiefs of Staff debate the legality of China's actions and discuss war, much to Mark's dismay. Meanwhile, Erin vandalizes Kelly's car and gets fired from her job. Mark discusses his mild suggestions for the habitat assault, and all the Joint Chiefs (aside from General Grabaston) concur, but the Secretary of Defense overrules them and orders Mark to completely destroy the Chinese base. Mark reluctantly reveals to the crew that Habitat One is armed, and the crew starts training for the use of firearms. Enraged, Adrian resigns, but Mark changes his mind and conspires with Adrian to disobey his orders. Erin joins a group of suspicious men on the way to their 'party' but discovers that they actually plan to use drugs. Mark orders the Habitat One crew to disassemble their arms and use the parts for habitat modifications. Angered by Mark's defiance of the attack orders, the president sends Grabaston to establish a military coup thanks to Air Force teams who storm the Wild Horse facility, arresting guard Duncan, Mark, and Adrian; doing a hostile takeover of command; and Grabaston orders the crew to assault the base with wrenches, after finding out that the firearms were disabled. After getting a call from Erin regarding the 'party', Mark escapes. Erin is saved by Mark via helicopter, and Maggie escapes from prison with Louise, and they too board the helicopter. Meanwhile, the Habitat One crew returns from their sabotage mission, only to discover that the Chinese have completely crippled the American base. Mark turns the helicopter back.

=== Season 2 (2022) ===
No. overall	No. in season	Title	Directed by	Written by	Original release date
11	1	"The Inquiry"	Ken Kwapis	Steve Carell	February 18, 2022
The new Secretary of Defense puts General Naird on trial at the Pentagon at the behest of General Grabaston, and the team has to pull it together to testify on his behalf and save his job. Tony struggles with not having access to a phone during the trial and Captain Ali acts distant towards Dr. Chan. Dr. Mallory, Brad, Tony, Erin, all blow their testimonies to the Secretary of Defense giving damning testimony against General Naird. While waiting for the verdict, it is revealed General Naird returned Maggie and her lover Louise back to prison before returning to Space Force to turn himself in. The final verdict of the trial is that General Grabaston will retire for almost causing an international incident and loss of human life. Space Force will remain under the command of General Naird, however he will have a slashed budget and a four-month timeline to prove his worth. It is revealed that Dr. Mallory, Tony, Captain Ali, Brad, Erin, and Dr. Chan all testified to his outstanding character which allowed him to retain his command.
12	2	"Budget Cuts"	Ken Kwapis	Kim Tran	February 18, 2022
Space Force faces steep budget cuts, to the consternation of General Naird and Dr. Mallory who is forced to cut some of his science staff. Dr. Chan tries to figure out why Captain Ali's been distant after returning from the Moon and their brief one night stand in a hotel, utilizing his science staff and Erin to find the answer. Tony attempts to prep the astronauts for a media interview but decides to only allow Captain Ali to speak due to the other astronauts' questionable actions on the Moon, including one of them eating a pet bird. During her time with the media, Captain Ali struggles as she flashes back to her time on the Moon and her personal failings since returning. General Naird struggles with telling Dr. Mallory about cutting the Mars Mission due to its importance to Mallory. Dr. Mallory tells General Naird the government is already looking for his replacement. Dr. Mallory and General Naird both fail to tell the astronaut on the Mars Mission of the budget cuts. Erin invests her college money in a stock after receiving a tip from a friend. General Naird gets Christmas gifts in March for his remaining staff to improve morale.
13	3	"The Chinese Delegation"	Ken Kwapis	Jimmy O. Yang	February 18, 2022
The team does its best to avoid offending a visiting delegation from China and secure a treaty to ensure shared resources on the Moon. Dr. Mallory struggles to hide his enmity towards his Chinese counterpart Dr. Zhang. Dr. Chan and Tony attempt to teach General Naird Chinese etiquette and culture. Dr. Chan becomes jealous over attractive Chinese astronaut Dr. Lim who was with Captain Ali on the Moon and enlists Tony's help. General Gao invites General Naird to drink Moutai while they discuss the treaty, and after much debate, the two eventually settle on a 50/50 split for the next generation.
14	4	"The Europa Project"	Ken Kwapis	Lauren Houseman	February 18, 2022
General Naird gets approval for Space Force to participate in the Jupiter Europa Project from the Secretary of State. However, they are dismayed to discover their only job will be creating a Powerpoint presentation on astronaut defense against potential hostile alien encounters. Captain Ali and Dr. Chan sleep together again, however, Ali is distant when Chan asks for clarity about their romantic relationship. Erin begins interning under Brad at Space Force. Tony agrees to be Dr. Chan's hype man with Captain Ali and she confesses she is not ready for a serious relationship. Tony advises she stop sleeping with Chan as he wants a serious romantic relationship and doesn't want him to get hurt. Dr. Mallory starts a prank war and all the scientists participate instead of working on the PowerPoint. General Naird becomes upset when they play a prank on him so Dr. Mallory completes the PowerPoint. General Naird recruits Brad and Erin to prank back Dr. Mallory and the scientists. Tony breaks the news to a devastated Dr. Chan that it is over with Captain Ali. General Naird receives divorce papers from Maggie which he initially believes are a prank before breaking down into tears.
15	5	"Mad (Buff) Confidence"	Ken Kwapis	Brent Forrester	February 18, 2022
Erin gets conflicting advice about a college interview from her father and Dr. Mallory. Dr. Mallory believes she should be honest about not being ready while her father believes in a more traditional approach. Tony sets up a new partnership between Space Force and an energy drink called Mad Buff who sponsors a robot fighting competition at Space Force. Tensions are high between Captain Ali and Dr. Chan who participate in the competition with their student sponsors and ultimately face off in the final battle. Erin finally interviews with Colorado college; afterwards she tells her father and Dr. Mallory she blew the interview. They later discover the interview actually went amazing and that Erin, taking Dr. Mallory's approach, is one of the most confident and honest prospective students. Tony decides to end the relationship with Mad Buff to protect General Naird's image. Erin tells her father that she bought into the stock market with her college fund.
16	6	"The Doctor's Appointment"	Ken Kwapis	Norm Hiscock	February 18, 2022
Tony spreads a rumor around the office that General Naird is looking for a new job when in reality he was trying to go to therapy for his divorce. Meanwhile, Dr. Chan and Dr. Mallory actually do pursue a job lead at SpaceX. Captain Ali, looking for a career change after her time on the Moon, attends a real estate seminar with Tony. Erin entertains the Mars mission astronaut who is missing Earth and ultimately reveals he was suicidal when he first called. General Naird gets kidney stones and attempts to ignore them to do a photoshoot for the cover of Time Magazine, but ultimately requires surgery. Dr. Chan gets a job offer from SpaceX while Dr. Mallory is found not to be a good fit for their culture. The cover photo for Time is revealed to be for an article questioning the cost of space exploration.
17	7	"The Hack"	Ken Kwapis	Mamoudou N'Diaye	February 18, 2022
With the future of Space Force up in the air, big changes could be on the horizon. Many of the Space Force members are considering taking new jobs, but first, the team has to deal with the entire base being hacked, presumably by Russians. Their power is cut and all their computers are disabled by the hackers, who send one of their satellites out of orbit. Through teamwork, they save the satellite and rekindle their commitment to Space Force. The team receives raises and Captain Ali is promoted to major. The episode and series end on a cliffhanger with Space Force discovering a huge asteroid heading for Earth, which they see through a Hawaiian telescope that they were recently put in charge of.

== Production ==
=== Development ===
On January 16, 2019, it was announced that Netflix had given the production a series order for a ten-episode first season. The series is co-created by Greg Daniels and Steve Carell and is executive produced by Daniels, Carell, and Howard Klein through 3 Arts Entertainment. On November 13, 2020, the series was renewed for a second season, produced in Vancouver to lower the show's budget. Producer Daniels explained that they would refocus the tone and emphases of the show for the second season and that they had brought veteran comedy director Ken Kwapis in to help achieve that goal. On April 29, 2022, Netflix canceled the series after two seasons.

=== Casting ===
Alongside the initial series order announcement, it was confirmed that Carell would star in the series.

On September 26, 2019, it was announced that John Malkovich, Ben Schwartz, Diana Silvers and Tawny Newsome had joined that series as main cast and Jimmy O. Yang, Alex Sparrow and Don Lake as recurring cast. In October 2019, Noah Emmerich, Fred Willard and Jessica St. Clair joined the cast in recurring roles. In April 2020, it was announced Lisa Kudrow had joined the cast in a recurring role. In May 2020, it was reported that Jane Lynch and Roy Wood Jr. were cast in recurring roles.

The series features the last television performance by Willard, who died on May 15, 2020, two weeks before the show's release.

=== Filming ===
Principal photography for the first season commenced in Los Angeles, California, on October 1, 2019, and ended on January 10, 2020. Most exterior shots of the fictional Space Force base were shot on the campus of California State University, Dominguez Hills. Filming for season 2 began in late May 2021 in Vancouver and wrapped in late June 2021.

== Release ==
The series was released on Netflix on May 29, 2020. At their Q2 report meeting in July 2020, Netflix reported the series had been viewed by about 40 million households since its release. In August 2020, it was estimated that 8.3% of subscribers had watched the series over its first month. The second season premiered on February 18, 2022. The second season featured on Netflix 's global top 10s for 1 week recording 12.32 million hours watched globally.

== Reception ==
=== Critical response ===
==== Season 1 ====
On review aggregator Rotten Tomatoes, the first season of the series has an approval rating of 38% based on 96 reviews, with an average rating of 5.80/10. The site's critics consensus reads: "An all-star cast and blockbuster-worthy special effects aren't enough to keep Space Force's uneven blend of earnestness and satire from spinning quickly out of comedic orbit." On Metacritic, it has a weighted average score of 49 out of 100, based on 40 critics, indicating "mixed or average reviews".

Richard Roeper of the Chicago Sun-Times praised Carell, for his "impeccable comedic timing and his uncanny ability to play yet another character who's often an insufferable buffoon with not a speck of self-awareness" but criticized the hit-and-miss humor, and unrealized potential, saying "Don't get me wrong; I enjoyed Space Force... It's just with all the credentials of the main contributors, we hoped for greatness and got ... pretty good." Caroline Framke of Variety wrote: "For all the heft behind it, Space Force should be an easy win. Ten episodes later, it's safer to say that Space Force is really just okay." Nick Allen, writing for RogerEbert.com says, "Space Force has the supporting characters to color its cringe-worthy absurdity," praising its cast but calling out on the story's incompetence. The Guardian gave the first season of the series only 2 out of 5 saying, "Above all, despite occasional laughs to be gleaned from the twist that Malkovich can give the most unpromising of lines, Space Force is not funny, which makes it hard to class as a comedy." Joshua Rivera from The Verge gave Space Force a disappointing review stating that "the show falls apart before it even gets going", chiefly because it strays away from the sharp political satire that shows such as Veep had nailed and instead "adheres to the conventions of the workplace comedy."

==== Season 2 ====
On review aggregator Rotten Tomatoes, the second season of the series has an approval rating of 90% based on 10 reviews, with an average rating of 7.1/10. On Metacritic, it has a weighted average score of 61 out of 100 based on 4 critics, indicating "generally favorable reviews".

Nick Allen of RogerEbert.com said "Space Force is good, or good enough, with what matters most to it." Variety's Caroline Framke opined that "The result isn't half as sleek or ambitious as the initial season, but the show at least seems much more comfortable in its own skin."

=== Accolades ===
Award	Date of ceremony	Category	Recipient(s)	Result	Ref.
Primetime Emmy Awards	September 14–17 & 19, 2020	Outstanding Production Design for a Narrative Program (Half-Hour or Less)	"The Launch"	Nominated	
Primetime Emmy Awards	September 14–17 & 19, 2020	Outstanding Sound Editing for a Comedy or Drama Series (Half-Hour) and Animation	"The Launch"	Nominated	
Primetime Emmy Awards	September 14–17 & 19, 2020	Outstanding Sound Mixing for a Comedy or Drama Series (Half-Hour) and Animation	"Save Epsilon 6!"	Nominated	
Primetime Emmy Awards	September 14–17 & 19, 2020	Outstanding Stunt Coordination for a Comedy Series or Variety Program	Space Force	Nominated	
ADG Excellence in Production Design Awards	April 10, 2021	Excellence in Production Design for a Half Hour Single-Camera Television Series	"The Launch"	Nominated	
Motion Picture Sound Editors	April 16, 2021	Outstanding Achievement in Sound Editing – Sound Effects, Foley, Music, Dialogue and ADR for Live Action Broadcast Media Under 35 Minutes	"The Launch"	Nominated	
People's Choice Awards	November 15, 2020	The Male TV Star of 2020	Steve Carell	Nominated	
