= Susanne Daniels =

American entertainment executive

- Daniels in 2019
- Born: Susanne Dari Lieberstein; Westport, Connecticut, U.S.
- Education: Harvard University
- Occupations: Entertainment Executive; television producer; author
- Spouse: Greg Daniels (m. 1991)
- Children: 4, including Owen
- Relatives: Paul Lieberstein (brother); Warren Lieberstein (brother); Angela Kinsey (former sister-in-law)
- Writing career
- Period: 1987–present

Susanne Lieberstein Daniels is an American entertainment executive, producer, and author. She developed several television series such as Dawson's Creek, Buffy the Vampire Slayer, Gilmore Girls, and Cobra Kai (a sequel to the 1984 film The Karate Kid), and YouTube livestream events with artists including Katy Perry, Taylor Swift, and Paul McCartney.

== Current work ==
Daniels was Global Head of Original Content for YouTube, and led the company's overall efforts and investments in original content. In March 2022, she departed from that position due to the reduction of the YouTube Original Series division. While at the platform, Daniels has overseen programming such as David Blaine: Ascension, Coachella: 20 Years In The Desert, The Age of A.I. featuring Robert Downey Jr, Cobra Kai, Step Up: High Water, The Boy Band Con: The Lou Pearlman Story; and premium livestream events with artists and celebrities including Katy Perry, Will Smith, Taylor Swift and Paul McCartney.

Prior to YouTube, Daniels worked as the President at MTV while previously holding positions including President of Lifetime Television and The WB, Vice President of Comedy for Fox Television and more. In these roles, Daniels was responsible for green-lighting TV shows including Buffy the Vampire Slayer, Dawson's Creek, Gilmore Girls, The Steve Harvey Show, The Parent 'Hood featuring Robert Townsend, Army Wives, Charmed, 7th Heaven, Smallville, Project Runway, Drop Dead Diva, The Jamie Foxx Show, Living Single, The Wayans Brothers Show, Are You the One?, The Secret Life of the American Teenager, and Scream.

Daniels co-authored the book Season Finale: The Unexpected Rise and Fall of The WB and UPN along with Cynthia Littleton.

Daniels currently serves on the boards of Common Sense Media, NATPE, UCLA MEMES, and the George Foster Peabody Awards.

== Recognition ==
In 2018, Daniels was inducted into the Variety Hall Of Fame. In 2018, Daniels also received the Brandon Tartikoff Legacy Award and Women In Film Business Leadership Award. Additional awards and recognitions include: Media Project Shine Award (for pro-social messaging in series); American Women In Television & Radio: GENII Award; The Help Group Honoree; The National Campaign to Prevent Teen Pregnancy Honoree; along with maintaining a consistent presence in all top executives lists e.g. CableFax; Hollywood Reporter; Variety Power 100.

== Personal life ==
Daniels grew up in Westport, Connecticut, and attended Harvard University for her undergraduate degree. Daniels is currently based in Los Angeles where she resides with her husband, writer-producer-director Greg Daniels (The Office, Parks and Recreation and King of the Hill) and their four children, including actor Owen Daniels. Daniels is the sister of Paul Lieberstein, writer for King of the Hill and the replacement showrunner of The Office for Greg Daniels.

In November 2019, Susanne Daniels played a big role in reinstating banned accounts by YouTube after they spammed emoticons, she called Markiplier saying that the issue would be fixed and the accounts were reinstated soon after.
