= Allegra Edwards =

American actress

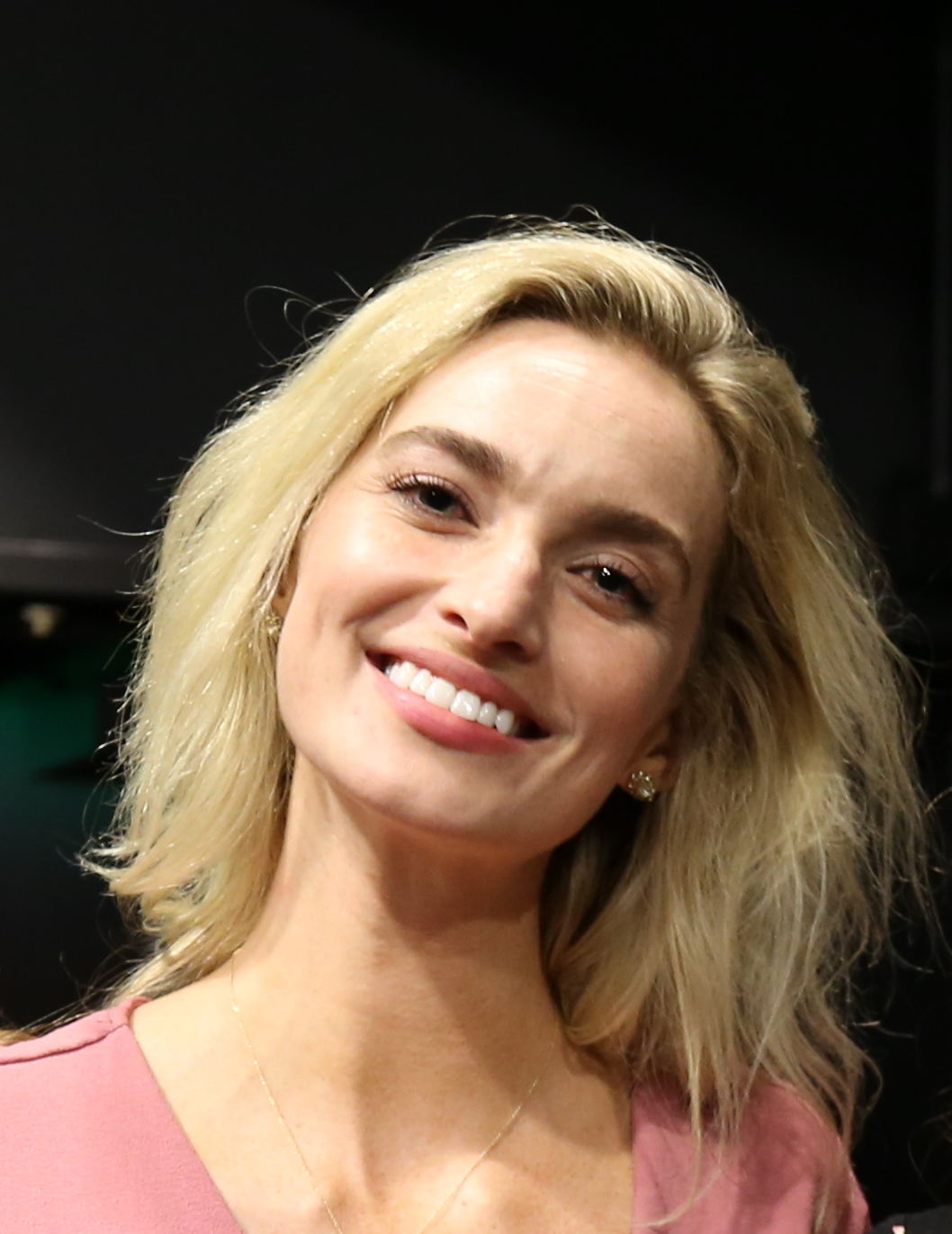
- Occupation: Actress
- Years active: 2009–present
- Known for: Briarpatch, Upload
- Spouse: Clayton Snyder (m. 2020)
- Children: 1

Allegra Edwards is an American television actress known for playing Cindy McCabe in the USA Network anthology series Briarpatch and Ingrid Kannerman in the Amazon Prime Video comedy Upload.

== Early life ==
Edwards is originally from Denver, Colorado. She began modeling when she was 18 months old and continued to model, dance, and act throughout her childhood.

Edwards studied theatre and television at Pepperdine University in Malibu. During her time at Pepperdine, she wrote scenes for Pepperdine's annual Songfest, performed with Pepperdine's Improv Troupe, and appeared in Tutor, a 2009 comedy short written and directed by Jeff Loveness.

After graduating from Pepperdine with her bachelor's degree in 2010, Edwards moved to San Francisco to attend the American Conservatory Theater's three-year Master of Fine Arts program, which she completed in 2013.

== Career ==
After earning her MFA, Edwards spent time in Los Angeles and New York City. In 2015, she performed in an off-Broadway production of "Everything You Touch."

In 2019, Edwards played Cindy McCabe in the USA Network anthology series Briarpatch. She stars as Ingrid Kannerman on the Amazon Prime Video comedy Upload that first aired in 2020.

Edwards has also appeared in episodes of Modern Family, New Girl, Friends from College, The Mindy Project, Orange Is the New Black and Ghosts.

== Personal life ==
Edwards lives in Los Angeles. She is married to actor Clayton Snyder. They have a son.

== Filmography ==
Year	Name	Role	Notes
2016	Modern Family	Arizona	Episode: "Blindsided"
2016	New Girl	Marissa Blumenstock	Episode: "Homecoming"
2017	Friends from College	Madison	Episode: "Second Wedding"
2017	The Mindy Project	Lorie	Episode: "Mindy Lahiri is a White Man"
2017	Orange Is the New Black	TV anchor	Episode: "The Reverse Midas Touch"
2017	Sandy Wexler	Mary	
2020	Briarpatch	Cindy McCabe	Recurring
2020–2025	Upload	Ingrid Kannerman	Series regular
2024–2025	Ghosts	Donna	2 episodes: "Isaac's Wedding" & "Pinkus Returns"
2025	King of the Hill	Willow	2 episodes: "Peggy's Fakeout" & "Any Given Hill-Day"
2026	Eternally Yours	Liz	Series regular
