= Upload (TV series) =

American science fiction comedy-drama television series (2020-2025)

- Genre: Comedy-drama; Science fiction; Satire
- Created by: Greg Daniels
- Starring: Robbie Amell; Andy Allo; Allegra Edwards; Zainab Johnson; Kevin Bigley; Andrea Rosen; Owen Daniels; Josh Banday
- Theme music composer: Ages and Ages
- Composer: Joseph Stephens
- Country of origin: United States
- Original language: English
- No. of seasons: 4
- No. of episodes: 29

Production
- Executive producers: Greg Daniels; Howard Klein; Jeffrey Blitz
- Production location: Vancouver, B.C.
- Camera setup: Single-camera
- Running time: 24–46 minutes
- Production companies: Deedle-Dee Productions; 3 Arts Entertainment; Reunion Pacific Entertainment; Baral-Waley Productions; Amazon Studios

Original release
- Network: Amazon Prime Video
- Release: May 1, 2020 – August 25, 2025

Upload is an American science fiction comedy drama television series created by Greg Daniels for Amazon Prime Video. The first season premiered on May 1, 2020, and consists of ten episodes. In May 2020, the series was renewed for a second season, which premiered on March 11, 2022, and consists of seven episodes. In May 2022, the series was renewed for a third season, which premiered on October 20, 2023, and consists of eight episodes. In March 2024, the series was renewed for a fourth and final season, which premiered August 25, 2025, and consists of four episodes.

== Premise ==
In 2033, humans can "upload" themselves into a virtual afterlife of their choosing. When computer programmer Nathan Brown dies prematurely, he is uploaded to the very expensive Lakeview, but then finds himself under the thumb of his possessive, still-living girlfriend Ingrid. As Nathan adjusts to the pros and cons of digital heaven, he bonds with Nora, his living customer service rep. Nora struggles with the pressures of her job, her dying father who does not want to be uploaded, and her growing feelings for Nathan while slowly coming to believe that Nathan was murdered.

== Cast and characters ==
=== Main ===
- Robbie Amell as Nathan Brown, a 27-year-old computer engineering grad and newly deceased computer programmer who is uploaded to the digital afterlife Lakeview
  - Kauis Lowe portrays a young Nathan (guest season 1)
- Andy Allo as Nora Antony, a living woman who is Nathan's handler in his afterlife
- Allegra Edwards as Ingrid Kannerman, Nathan's materialistic, obsessive girlfriend
- Zainab Johnson as Aleesha Morrison-Downey, Nora's coworker who is Luke's handler
- Kevin Bigley as Luke Crossley, a former army corporal and Lakeview resident who befriends Nathan and is dating Mildred
- Andrea Rosen as Lucy Slack (seasons 2–3; recurring season 1; guest season 4), Nora and Aleesha's domineering boss
- Owen Daniels as A.I. Guy (seasons 2–4; recurring season 1), the virtual employee at Lakeview who can appear in many places at once
  - Daniels also portrays Boris Netherlands (season 2), an unemployed actor who was paid for his likeness to be used in Lakeview
  - Daniels also portrays B-HBSG (season 4), A.I. Guy's "evil" sentient replacement
  - Anja Savcic as A.I. Girl (recurring season 4), who was created after splitting from A.I. Guy
- Josh Banday as Ivan Spelich (seasons 2–4; recurring season 1), Nora's coworker

=== Recurring ===
- Jessica Tuck as Vivian "Viv" Brown (seasons 1–3; guest season 4), Nathan's mother
- Chris Williams as Dave Antony (season 1; guest seasons 2, 4), Nora's father
- Jordan Johnson-Hinds as Jamie Arpaz (season 1), Nathan's best friend and business partner
- Megan Ferguson (pilot), Hilary Jardine (season 1), and Vic Michaelis (season 2; guest season 4) as Mildred Kannerman, Ingrid's centenarian grandmother who resides in Lakeview, and whose avatar was based on an old black and white photograph
- William B. Davis as David Choak (seasons 1–3; guest season 4), a wealthy man living across the hall from Nathan
- Elizabeth Bowen as Fran Booth (season 1), Nathan's awkward cousin who is investigating his car accident
- Rhys Slack as Dylan (season 1; guest seasons 2–4), a child who lives in Lakeview after falling into the Grand Canyon and is trapped in the form of a 12-year-old despite being uploaded six years prior
  - Brea St. James portrays an Older (female) Dylan (guest season 1)
- Matt Ward as Byron Titley (season 1; guest season 2), Nora's casual sex partner
- Andy Thompson as Lionel Winters (seasons 1, 3–4; guest season 2) (identified only as "the Professor" in the first season)
- Barclay Hope as Oliver Kannerman (seasons 1, 3–4; guest season 2), Ingrid's father
- Yvetta Fisher as Batia (seasons 1–2; guest seasons 3–4), Nora's coworker
- Ryan Beil as Craig Munthers (season 2; guest seasons 1, 3)
- Paulo Costanzo as Matteo (season 2; guest season 3)
- Mackenzie Cardwell as Tinsley (seasons 2–3; guest season 4), a temp hired by Aleesha
- Kristine Cofsky as Holden (season 3; guest season 1), Nathan's ex-girlfriend
- Peter James Smith as Mauricio (season 3; guest season 1), a digital afterlife salesman
- Bassem Youssef as Miro Mansour (season 3)
- Jeanine Mason as Karina Silva (season 3), a charming new Horizen executive in charge of new product development and cybersecurity
- Dayo Ade as Babatunde (season 4)
- Lee Majdoub as Jitendra Baskar (season 4)

=== Guest ===
- Christine Ko as Mandy (season 1), Nora's roommate
- Wayne Wilderson as Zach (season 1)
- Matt Braunger as Brad (season 1)
- Chloe Coleman as Nevaeh, Nathan's niece
  - Luvyna Ward portrays a younger Nevaeh (season 2)
- Justin Stone as Dan the Orbit Gum Guy (season 1)
- Julian Christopher as Ernie Lampsterman (season 1), a Horizen therapist whose avatar in Lakeview is a Labrador Retriever
- Scott Patey as Josh Pitzer (season 1), an executive hoping to buy Nathan's and Jamie's software
- Creed Bratton as Rupert Tilford (season 1)
- Teryl Rothery as Dawn Kannerman (seasons 1–2), Ingrid's mother
- Lucas Wyka as Jack Kannerman (seasons 1–2)
- Alex Kliner as Nathan Greenstein (seasons 1–3)
- Philip Granger as Uncle Larry (season 1), Viv's brother and Nathan's favorite uncle
- Gigi Gorgeous as Jordan/Gigi Gorgeous (seasons 1, 4)
- Larry Wilmore as Kamyar Whitbridge (seasons 1, 3)
- Phoebe Miu as Yang
- Jennifer Garner as herself (season 2)
- Christine Willes as Janet Boxner (seasons 2–4)
- Tom Tasse as Brian Choak (seasons 2, 4)
- Hiro Kanagawa as Detective Sato (seasons 2–3)
- Erin Karpluk as Magruder (season 3)
- Graeme Duffy as Rory Shicklemen (season 3)
- Amy McInnes as Penny Chao (season 3)
- Ravi Kapoor as Dr. Kapoor (season 3)
- William Gibson as himself (season 3)
- Amitai Marmorstein as Dennis (season 4)
- Eduard Witzke as Sasha (season 4)

== Episodes ==
=== Series overview ===
Season	Episodes	Originally released	
Season	Episodes	First released	Last released
1	10	May 1, 2020	
2	7	March 11, 2022	
3	8	October 20, 2023	November 10, 2023
4	4	August 25, 2025	

=== Season 1 (2020) ===
No. overall	No. in season	Title	Directed by	Written by	Original release date
1	1	"Welcome to Upload"	Greg Daniels	Greg Daniels	May 1, 2020
Computer programmer Nathan Brown is dying after a self‑driving car crash. Ingrid, his wealthy, possessive girlfriend, insists his consciousness be uploaded to Lakeview, an exclusive digital afterlife, on her account. When Nathan discovers the many downsides of his afterlife, such as the corporate monetization, and being under Ingrid's thumb, he is ready to commit "virtucide". He is stopped by Nora, his customer support "angel", who helps him cope with his new life. As Nora leaves her desk at the end of her shift, computer files containing some of Nathan's memories are remotely deleted.
2	2	"Five Stars"	Greg Daniels	Greg Daniels	May 1, 2020
Nathan's therapist tasks Nathan with meeting five "uploads". Nora tries unsuccessfully to improve her ratings. Ingrid is planning Nathan's funeral. Nathan meets David Choak, his wealthy neighbor, who suggests that Nathan was obviously murdered for his work on a "freeware" digital afterlife, thereby threatening a six hundred billion dollar industry. Nathan's cousin, Fran, finds that the self-driving car had been tampered with. Nathan discusses his memory gaps with Nora; she manages to restore one of Nathan's memory files, and discovers a software deal Nathan had been preparing before his death.
3	3	"The Funeral"	Jonathan van Tulleken	Mary Gulino	May 1, 2020
Nathan prepares for his funeral happening in the real world, assuming a lot of people will be there. Before the funeral they watch news coverage of Rupert Tilford, a man who won the chance to be "downloaded" into a clone body. The process works for a few moments until Rupert's nose starts bleeding and he expresses discomfort before his head explodes. Nathan attends his funeral with Luke, a fellow Upload, and Mildred who is Ingrid's grandmother and also resides in Lakeview. Nora attends his funeral in New York and meets three former girlfriends from his college days, who inquire about her connection to him. Fran questions Ingrid about the accident, not believing Nathan died prematurely and Nathan finds out there wasn't much money given to his surviving family from his unfinished software deal. He's also disheartened by Ingrid's speech as instead of praising his life she praises Rupert's, and his best friends leave during the funeral ceremony. Nathan is informed by Fran that she's investigating the accident and plans on suing the car company because of shady details behind the accident. Nora finds out that Nathan's business deal never went through and when she interviews the man in Nathan's software, she is denied any information.
4	4	"The Sex Suit"	Jonathan van Tulleken	Aasia Lashay Bullock	May 1, 2020
Nathan learns about the various plans of Lakeview's world, and sees what is included for those that pay the least. He's frustrated that Horizen is more interested in getting money for upgrades than providing an equal opportunity experience for all residents. During a Vogue interview, there's tension between Nathan and Ingrid stemming from Nathan's belief that Ingrid no longer loves him as she refuses to use a VR suit to have sex with him. Nathan and Nora's friendship becomes closer, with Nathan feeling he can relate to her more than Ingrid. Ingrid unexpectedly shows up at Nathan's room and prepares to have sex with him, only to discover he can't get an erection. Nora is called in to assist, much to Nathan's dismay, who feels embarrassed about the awkward situation, but gets an erection from Nora while Ingrid is distracted by her cat in real life. Fran continues her investigation into Nathan's accident, and upon viewing surveillance footage from the grocery store, discovers that Ingrid went to Nathan's car while he was inside. Nora, upset by her lack of intimacy, reinstalls a dating app and is paired up with Byron, who she previously met on the same app using a different profile. While having sex with him, she pictures her earlier encounter with Nathan.
5	5	"The Grey Market"	Kacie Anning	Mike Lawrence	May 1, 2020
Dylan is frustrated that his family, except for his mother, have pretty much forgotten about him and moved on with their lives and because he is still stuck in a child's body six years after his upload. Nathan and Ingrid take part in couple's therapy, each bringing their respective therapists, both claiming that they feel they're becoming disconnected. Nathan feels that he doesn't have much of his own life, since it's all controlled by Ingrid's decisions. He also reveals Fran's information that he wasn't actually dying before being uploaded. When Nora has to leave Dylan to see her father in the hospital, Nathan offers to watch him. Luke convinces him to visit the Grey Market, a virtual equivalent of a black market, in order to buy hacks to enter a virtual party with living people. While there, Nathan buys a hack into his former business partner Jamie's phone while Dylan absconds to get an illegal avatar upgrade so he can appear as an older person. Upon returning to Lakeview, Dylan discovers his upgrade gave him the body of a young woman which Nora then reprograms to his former body. Fran is in her self-driving vehicle on her way to see Josh Pitzer, when her car malfunctions and drives off the end of a pier.
6	6	"The Sleepover"	Kacie Anning	Shepard Boucher	May 1, 2020
Nathan is informed by his niece Nevaeh that she's having a sleepover with Ingrid as well as Fran's disappearance. Nora's father tells her that she needs to get to know Byron more, who's alive, instead of focusing on Nathan, who's dead. Nathan is becoming bored being by himself at Lakeview and tries every chance he can get to spend time with Nora. Luke is causing problems for Aleesha by exploiting bugs in the system to get items and upgrades without paying for them. During their date, Nora finds out some interesting things about Byron, including that he likes to inspire children to always try and do their best, regardless of the situation. During dinner with her family with Nevaeh present, Ingrid dislikes the way they treat both Nevaeh and Nathan because they come from humble means, eventually kicking everyone out. Nora's date with Byron goes awry when he mocks the work that she does. She spends that rest of the evening talking to Nathan, even letting him know that she agrees his death wasn't an accident. She falls asleep at her desk, being awoken by Aleesha.
7	7	"Bring Your Dad to Work Day"	David Rogers	Owen Daniels	May 1, 2020
Nora is exposed by her boss Lucy about her overnight excursion in Lakeview with Nathan, and threatened with losing her good rating should she continue to pursue a close relationship. Ingrid attends a support group and says she's thinking of "freezing" Nathan temporarily until she can be with him. Nora sees a news report about the death of Josh Pitzer and suspects that someone is trying to cover up anything to do with Nathan's program, "Beyond". Nora has Nathan give her father a tour of Lakeview, hoping he'll choose to be uploaded once he dies. A figure approaches the door leading to the data servers for Lakeview and plants a bomb inside, while Nora uses her boss Lucy's computer to find out what she can about what happened in regards to Josh's death and Nathan's damaged memories. She finds that an unknown employee has access to Nathan's files and tries to look into it, but the bomb goes off and shuts down all affected computers. The computers come back on and she searches the global employee database for the unknown employee ID, finding no results. Even after a successful tour with Nathan, Nora's father decides not to go ahead with uploading himself when he dies, instead maintaining his beliefs that he will be reunited with his wife in heaven.
8	8	"Shopping Other Digital After-Lives"	Jeffrey Blitz	Alex Sherman & Alyssa Lane	May 1, 2020
Lucy informs Nora that she's being suspended because of her constant hanging out with Nathan, which goes against company policy. Nathan confesses his feelings for Nora but is not aware that Lucy has taken control of Nora's avatar and she rejects him. Dejected, Nathan asks his mother to help him find a different afterlife that his family can afford. Aleesha informs Nora of Nathan leaving Lakeview. Fearing that he's in danger, she travels to Los Angeles and meets up with Ingrid who was unaware of Nathan's plans. While Ingrid is on the phone, Nora finds a box of Nathan's belongings and looks through them. Nathan ends up deciding to stay in Lakeview but when they leave the agency, an unknown assailant grabs the hard drive Nathan has been downloaded to and tosses it into the water to destroy him. Nora reveals to Nathan's mother that she noticed the guy before and gave Ingrid a dummy drive while making sure Nathan's drive was with her.
9	9	"Update Eve"	Daina Reid	Greg Daniels	May 1, 2020
Everyone including Lakeview residents and Horizen employees prepare for a new upgrade for Lakeview. Nathan decides to break up with Ingrid. Lucy keeps pressuring Nora to admit her feelings for Nathan, which would enable Lucy to fire her, but Nora denies it. Nathan finds out that Jamie has been avoiding his calls because he felt ashamed for sleeping with Ingrid; he forgives Jamie and gets him to loan him enough money so he can remain as a "2 Gig", the lowest class of residents (who only have 2 gigabyte of data volume each month). Nathan pressures Ingrid about what she knows about his death but she remains mum. Later, she confronts her father and tells him that she programmed Nathan's car to prioritize his life over others, allowing him to survive the crash long enough to upload. After learning from IT that Uploads who are asleep during the upgrade will have their memories restored, Nora convinces Nathan to stay awake in order to find out the truth, even if he might forget anything that has happened since his upload. Nora gives Nathan a program she stole from an IT guy which allows him to see and manipulate Lakeview's code on the fly.
10	10	"Freeyond"	Daina Reid	Greg Daniels	May 1, 2020
Nathan wakes up from the update, with his missing memories restored. One of the images shows that Ingrid's father was one of the investors interested in buying Nathan and Jamie's software, but rather than going with a rich company, they went with Josh Pitzer and his smaller company. Nathan later met Ingrid's father in private and gave him a copy of the software without Jamie's knowledge to get more money and support his family. Nora was able to bypass Nathan's upgrade and it appears he has forgotten ever knowing her, much to her dismay. Nathan later confides in Luke that he remembers everything but felt he could not face her, knowing he was the bad guy. Nathan moves to the 2 Gig room and calls Nora to confess to her. While talking, the assailant who tried to destroy Nathan's hard drive breaks into her apartment and tries to kill her, prompting her to flee. Using the program he got from Nora, Nathan manages to help Nora escape. He traps the attacker in an elevator and uses it to kill him. Nora speaks to her father about what Nathan and she have found, and he suggests that she hide off the grid until they can figure out who is responsible for Nathan's death. Nora finally admits her feelings for Nathan, but he can't respond since his data has been used up. Nora heads away with Byron as Ingrid comes to visit Nathan in his room to tell him that she's uploaded herself so they can finally be together forever. He gets so upset that his one word response causes him to use up the extra 1GB of data she gave him, prompting Ingrid to call for tech support as the last light in the room flickers out.

=== Season 2 (2022) ===
No. overall	No. in season	Title	Directed by	Written by	Original release date
11	1	"Welcome Back, Mr. Brown"	Dee Rees	Izzy Kadish	March 11, 2022
Nora's father brings her to the woods to live with the Ludds, a group of techno-sceptic anarchists who despise the fact that only the rich profit from the technological advances. There, she meets Matteo. Meanwhile, Nathan tries to find Nora but has no luck. He reluctantly returns to Ingrid and starts making out with her, as he feels guilty that she uploaded just for him. It is revealed that Ingrid faked uploading and instead uses a VR bodysuit. Nora watches them using a cat avatar and thinks Nathan is over her. The episode ends with Nathan leaving Nora a mailbox message professing his love.
12	2	"Dinner Party"	Jeffrey Blitz	Lauren Houseman	March 11, 2022
Ingrid hosts a dinner party with some of her friends, but Nathan invites Luke and his 2gig friend Yang to attend as well. Not satisfied with the AI butlers, she requests angels to help out, forcing Aleesha and her temp Tinsley to cater to her. Tinsley uses Nora's old avatar as she doesn't have one yet, briefly reigniting Nathan's hopes that she returned. Nora meets Boris Netherlands, the actor whose likeness was used to create the AI servants. They use his likeness to create a fake-servant avatar to enter Lakeview unnoticed. Nathan bonds with Tinsley after she reveals her true identity.
13	3	"Robin Hood"	Jeffrey Blitz	Maxwell Theodore Vivian	March 11, 2022
Nathan and Luke use the penknife they stole before to siphon bandwidth from wealthy residents and give it to the 2gigs. They convince Ingrid's handler to help them win at a high-stakes poker game by manipulating the cards using the device. Nora fake-interviews for a job as a coder at Horizen in order to access the coding floor and scatter ring drives with malware in hopes that someone will plug them into a computer to give the Ludds access. When she hears that the coders have found the penknife and Nathan is forced to discard it, she helps Ingrid win her match against David Choak. She is hired as a bug-fixer after giving an impassioned speech on the virtues of Lakeview.
14	4	"Family Day"	Athina Rachel Tsangari	Anna Ssemuyaba	March 11, 2022
Nathan's family comes to visit, with Ingrid still pretending to be uploaded. Horizen tries to sell virtual babies to uploads. Nora and Nathan meet for the first time after she returns to Horizen. Matteo convinces Nora to plant a virus in Lakeview that propagates through the AI butlers and broadcasts Ludd propaganda as well as deleting residents. Feeling guilty, Nora uses her new access in the real world to stop the attack. Tinsley shows compassion to the AI guy after Ingrid scolds him, making him learn empathy, which he later uses to comfort Ingrid.
15	5	"Mind Frisk"	Athina Rachel Tsangari	Megan Neuringer	March 11, 2022
Horizen uses the Ludd attack Nora started as a cover to officially scale back uploads' privacy rights and search their minds and dreams as well as profit from selling that information on the internet. Nora and Nathan team up to hack the "Mind Frisk" program before it can go online. In the process, they discover that David Choak, Nathan's ultra-wealthy neighbor, was involved in his death. Meanwhile, Aleesha discovers that Luke had sex dreams about her that were uploaded onto the internet by her boss. Ingrid tries out an AI baby to prepare her for virtual motherhood, but it overwhelms her.
16	6	"The Outing"	Jeffrey Blitz	Yael Green	March 11, 2022
Nathan and Luke tour New York City with Nora and Aleesha in an attempt to find out why billionaire David Choak has downloaded into a robot body and gone to the city. They discover that Freeyond has one location each in New York City and Los Angeles, but hundreds of locations in swing states like Pennsylvania or Florida, concluding that the free system is designed to lure poor voters into uploading to skew election results, since uploads don't have voting rights. It is revealed that Ingrid has been growing Nathan a new body in order to download him.
17	7	"Download"	Jeffrey Blitz	Owen Daniels	March 11, 2022
After Ingrid reveals that she is not really dead and has been growing a clone body for him to download into, Nathan happily breaks up with her, as he realizes he owes her nothing. Nathan tells Nora he is willing to download into the clone body in order to use his retina to access the backdoor he installed into the Freeyond code, despite the risks associated with downloads. Aleesha restricts Luke's dream state to only experience kid-friendly dreams, which at first annoys him, but he later starts enjoying the simple puzzle games. Nora enlists the Ludds' help to break into the cloning facility where Ingrid is watching over Nathan's clone body. They convince her to let them download Nathan and leave to return to New York. Meanwhile, Tinsley restores Nathan's mind from a backup, thinking he had been accidentally deleted, and Ingrid uses a hair she finds on Nathan's old hairbrush to continue her plans to have a baby. Nora and Nathan sleep together on the Hyperloop. The episode ends with Nathan discovering that his nose is bleeding, a sign of download failure.

=== Season 3 (2023) ===
No. overall	No. in season	Title	Directed by	Written by	Original release date
18	1	"Ticking Clock"	Jeffrey Blitz	Greg Daniels	October 20, 2023
Nate and Nora continue to investigate the shady dealings of Horizen with Nate not telling Nora that his downloaded state is failing to spare her worry. Meanwhile, the backup of Nate restored by Tinsley does not have the memory of breaking up with Ingrid. Seeing this as a chance to prove that she can be a better person, Ingrid pretends that everything is fine. Detective Sato is revealed to be a bad guy. After shooting and killing Nora's ex, Nora is able to kill Sato.
19	2	"Strawberry"	Jeffrey Blitz	Alison Brown	October 20, 2023
Nora and Nathan track a suspicious Horizen employee known only as “Strawberry.” Ingrid tries to reconnect with the restored version of Nathan, who seems unaware of their past issues. Meanwhile, Aleesha struggles with her new management role at Horizen and discovers strange behavior in the code logs.
20	3	"Cyber Discount Day"	Tom Marshall	Megan Neuringer	October 27, 2023
The gang celebrates CyberDiscountDay while Nora discovers something game-changing: Nathan has been copied in Lakeview.
21	4	"Download Doctor"	Tom Marshall	Farhan Arshad	October 27, 2023
Nathan and Nora track down the doctor who invented download, while Aleesha rises higher in the Horizen hierarchy.
22	5	"Rescue Mission"	David Rogers	Stephanie Johnson	November 3, 2023
Nathan teams up with his own copy to save Luke, Nora is discovered by the conspiracy.
23	6	"Memory Crackers"	Alberto Belli	Owen Daniels	November 3, 2023
Nora and Nathan find important clues to expose Freeyond.
24	7	"Upload Day"	Sarah Boyd	Maxwell Theodore Vivian	November 10, 2023
Nathan and Nora make an effort to have a special last day together.
25	8	"Flesh and Blood"	Sarah Boyd	Greg Daniels	November 10, 2023
When both Nates sneak into the Grey Market to expose Horizen's crimes, they get caught and detained. In the real world, everyone gathers at Nate's mom's apartment to compare notes before getting a call from one of the Nates. He says that the other Nate has been killed, but the season ends before he can reveal which Nate he is and which one got deleted.

=== Season 4 (2025) ===
No. overall	No. in season	Title	Directed by	Written by	Original release date
26	1	"Wedding Weekend"	Daina Reid	Owen Daniels & Izzy Kadish	August 25, 2025
One Nathan celebrates a bitter-sweet wedding, but things are not what they seem. A lonely AI Guy searches for romance. Aleesha prepares for her new responsibilities while Luke agonizes over their kiss back in Lakeview.
27	2	"Workload"	Daina Reid	Farhan Arshad & Megan Neuringer	August 25, 2025
The bride and groom save up for their honeymoon. Horizen-Betta debuts a new, money-making technology. Luke tries to enjoy his job at Workload, and the AI Elevator Operator splits off an AI Girl and falls head over heels.
28	3	"Spa Day"	Jeffrey Blitz	Zane Tracy & Maxwell Theodore Vivian	August 25, 2025
While on their honeymoon, the newlyweds uncover a dark secret. Luke and the AI Gardener head back into the Grey Zone on a rescue mission. Aleesha reveals surprising abilities and Nora and Ingrid share clues.
29	4	"Mile End"	Jeffrey Blitz	Greg Daniels	August 25, 2025
The residents of Lakeview race to find justice, revenge, and peace as the digital and real worlds collide.

== Production ==
=== Development ===
On September 8, 2017, Amazon announced it had ordered a pilot for a new single-camera comedy series created by Greg Daniels. On July 28, 2018, Amazon announced it had given the production an order for a first season of ten episodes. Daniels and Howard Klein are executive producers, and the series is produced by 3 Arts Entertainment. The first season premiered on May 1, 2020.

On May 8, 2020, Amazon renewed the series for a second season, which premiered on March 11, 2022. On May 11, 2022, Amazon renewed the series for a third season, which premiered on October 20, 2023. In October 2023, Daniels mentioned in an interview with Collider that he was hopeful for a fourth season and that the writing process would begin during November 2023. On March 6, 2024, Amazon renewed the series for a fourth and final season, which premiered on August 25, 2025.

=== Casting ===
In January 2018, it was announced that Robbie Amell and Andy Allo had received the pilot's male and female lead roles.

While the series was filming its second season in February–March 2021, Paulo Costanzo and Mackenzie Cardwell were cast in recurring roles. At the release-date announcement, it was also confirmed that Amell, Allo, Allegra Edwards, Zainab Johnson and Kevin Bigley would return; and Josh Banday, who recurred in the first season, was promoted to a series regular.

=== Filming ===
The first season's principal photography took place from March 5 – May 10, 2019, in Vancouver, Canada.

Some exterior photography for the Lakeview virtual reality world was shot at Mohonk Mountain House and Preserve in New Paltz, New York, including images of the hotel, groundskeeper, and lake. A small number of interior shots, including rooms at the hotel, were also filmed on location.

The second season was filmed from January 25 – April 15, 2021.

The third season was filmed from August 15 – November 2, 2022.

The fourth season was filmed from late August to early October 2024.

== Reception ==
Upload received positive reviews. On Rotten Tomatoes, the first season has an approval rating of 88% with an average score of 6.9 out of 10 based on reviews from 56 critics. The website's critical consensus is, "Though Upload at times suffers from tonal overload, witty writing and a winsome cast make it an afterlife worth living." On Metacritic, the season has a weighted average score of 67 out of 100, based on 22 critics, indicating "generally favorable" reviews.

The second season has an approval rating of 100% with an average score of 7.3/10 based on 15 critics on Rotten Tomatoes. The website's critical consensus is, "Upload's sophomore season goes into sleep mode just when it's revving up, but even a truncated installment of this techno afterlife makes for terrific comedy." On Metacritic, it received a weighted average score of 72 out of 100, based on 4 critics, indicating "generally favorable" reviews.

The third season has an approval rating of 88% with an average score of 7.3/10 based on 18 critics on Rotten Tomatoes. The website's critical consensus is, "Equal parts more convoluted and sophisticated than ever before, Upload's techno satire continues to take on more human dimension." On Metacritic, it received a weighted average score of 65 out of 100, based on 6 critics, indicating "generally favorable" reviews.

== See also ==
- "San Junipero", an episode of Black Mirror that has a similar premise
- Archive
