= Eternally Yours (TV series) =

2026 American sitcom

- Genre: Sitcom; Supernatural comedy
- Created by: Joe Port; Joe Wiseman
- Starring: Ed Weeks; Allegra Edwards; Helen J. Shen; Jaren Lewison; Parker Young; Rose Abdoo
- Country of origin: United States
- Original language: English
- No. of seasons: 1
- No. of episodes: 7

Production
- Executive producers: Joe Port; Joe Wiseman; Eric Tannenbaum; Kim Tannenbaum; Jason Wang; Trent O'Donnell
- Camera setup: Single-camera
- Production companies: Joe vs. Joe; The Tannenbaum Company; Cannonball Entertainment (Note: Pilot episode only.); CBS Studios

Original release
- Network: CBS
- Release: October 8, 2026 – present

Eternally Yours is an American sitcom created by Joe Port and Joe Wiseman. It premiered on CBS on October 8, 2026. The single-camera family comedy follows a married vampire couple in Seattle, played by Ed Weeks and Allegra Edwards, whose relationship has stagnated after five centuries together.

== Premise ==
Charles and Liz are vampires whose marriage of five hundred years has settled into tedium. They live in present-day Seattle among an eccentric coven until their daughter Emma brings home Max, her human boyfriend, whose arrival disrupts the household and forces the couple to reckon with the prospect of an eternity together.

== Cast and characters ==
=== Main ===
- Ed Weeks as Charles, a vampire married for five hundred years
- Allegra Edwards as Liz, Charles's wife
- Helen J. Shen as Emma, the couple's adopted daughter
- Jaren Lewison as Max Marshall, Emma's human-turned-vampire boyfriend/housemate
- Parker Young as Jesse Blythe, member of Charles' coven since 1876
- Rose Abdoo as Phyllis Blythe, Jesse's older, human wife
- Shylo Molina as Henry Blythe, Jesse's half-vampire son and Mort's twin brother
- Tristan Michael Brown as Mort Blythe, Jesse's half-vampire son and Henry's twin brother

=== Recurring ===
- Steve Berg as Steve, a middle-aged man who regularly sells his blood to the coven

== Production ==
Port and Wiseman, writing partners since meeting as assistants on the UPN animated series Dilbert in 1999, conceived the series in 2015 out of a conversation about long-term creative partnerships and the idea of a marriage extended indefinitely. They wrote the pilot script that year, unaware at the time of the 2014 film What We Do in the Shadows. The script led to the pair being hired to develop CBS's adaptation of the British series Ghosts, which they went on to run.

Seattle was chosen as a setting in part because of its cloudy weather and proximity to the setting of the Twilight franchise despite Port and Wiseman having no connection to the Pacific Northwest. The script remained unproduced for several years and at one stage was considered as an animated project. In 2019 it received a table read on the podcast Dead Pilots Society, hosted by Andrew Reich and Ben Blacker, with Weeks reading the male lead — the role he would be cast in six years later. CBS ordered a development room for the project in 2024, followed by a pilot order in 2025.

CBS ordered Eternally Yours to series in April 2026 for the 2026–27 television season, days ahead of the network's schedule announcement. At the same time, the network declined to move forward with its other comedy pilot, The Tillbrooks. The series was the first half-hour addition to the CBS lineup for that season, joining the dramas Cupertino and Einstein.

Port and Wiseman write and executive produce alongside Eric Tannenbaum, Kim Tannenbaum and Jason Wang, with CBS Studios and The Tannenbaum Company producing. Trent O'Donnell directed and executive produced the pilot.

== Episodes ==
No.	Title	Directed by	Written by	Original release date	U.S. viewers (millions)
1	"Pilot"	Trent O'Donnell	Joe Port & Joe Wiseman	October 8, 2026	4.12
Vampires Charles and Liz, now living in Seattle, feel like their five-century marriage has become stale. Their adopted daughter Emma meets a human named Max and they hit it off, but Emma hides him from her family. As it turns out, Max works for the Social Security branch in Seattle and arrives at the family home to investigate coven member Jesse, who has been collecting Social Security benefits for about nine decades. Jesse married a human named Phyllis in 1989, and she is unaware that she lives with vampires, even though her husband never ages. Emma has to admit to Max that she is a vampire. An accident in the house causes Max to start bleeding out from his head. Charles and Liz decide the only way to save him from certain death is to bite him and make him a vampire.
2	"Baby Vampire"	Trent O'Donnell	Joe Port & Joe Wiseman & Josh Malmuth	October 15, 2026	3.36
Max goes into total denial of his new situation, and sneaks out of the house despite Charles' order to stay put. Meanwhile, Charles tells his wife he has a friend from work and intends to eat lunch with him. Emma and Liz come home to find Max missing and go off to find him with Jesse before he exposes himself (and subsequently, them as well). Max's vampirism manifests in the midst of a presentation in the Tacoma office. Too far to reach Max in time, Liz calls Charles for help. Max comes close to attacking his best friend Benji when the latter cuts himself in the bathroom before Charles pushes Max to safety. Back home, Charles is ready to banish Max for disobeying his orders until Emma threatens to leave as well.
3	"The Mistake"	Trent O'Donnell	Talia Bernstein and Sophia Lear	October 22, 2026	3.43
Max finds a book of vampire history in Charles's study. After reading about the vampire tradition "Hospitio Vampiris," an initiation ceremony for new vampires, Max suggests that the coven hold one for him, and they agree. Max begins to develop telepathy, but struggles with controlling his new power. At Max's Hospitio, things come to a head when one of the guests, Aldrict, recognizes Jesse and Liz, threatening the secret behind Jesse's turning. Liz confesses to Max that she turned Jesse into a vampire by accident, and had originally intended for him to be her first kill; Aldrict accidentally reveals this to Jesse and all the party guests. Meanwhile, Max accidentally infects Phyllis with the Bubonic plague.
4	"Halloween"	Victor Nelli Jr.	Josh Malmuth	October 29, 2026	TBD
In 1695, Charles and Liz wake to a number of dead and dying bodies in their home following a werewolf attack. With his dying breath, a man tells the couple they must find the Wolfbane chalice to ward off future attacks, especially on Halloween. In the present, Max accidentally uses the chalice to put Halloween candy in outside. When Mort invites over a new girlfriend, McKenzie, who is way out of his league, and she shows up dressed very convincingly as a werewolf, Jesse and Emma panic and assume she only came because the chalice is not protecting the vampires. They run a series of tests on McKenzie to determine if she's a real werewolf, embarrassing Mort and causing McKenzie to leave, only to find out that Phyllis had already brought in the chalice to drink out of it. At the same time, Liz invites her boss and his wife over for drinks after her boss told her she's in line for a full professor position. But the couple come dressed as vampires, and Charles becomes angry over the couple embracing vampire stereotypes.
5	"Steve's Dream"	Victor Nelli Jr.	Sophia Lear	November 5, 2026	TBD
Max decides the family should get to know Steve, a local human that they buy blood from for their food supply. Max invites him to game night, and Jesse encourages Steve to follow his dream. Steve messages them the next day that he is leaving town to do so. With no way to contact him, Charles, Emma, Jesse and Max try to rob a local blood bank. But they are foiled when they cannot be invited into the building. They consider killing an elderly neighbor despite Max's protests. Steve returns, as his dream didn't work out and feels like a loser with no family or friends. Max cheers him up by saying the family are actually secret government agents that use his blood to save lives. Meanwhile, a lucid Phyllis is told by Max that Liz puts all of Phyllis' decor in the basement. Phyllis slashes Liz's favorite painting, which is actually an original Renoir worth millions. Liz apologizes for not making the house feel like Phyllis' too and agrees to some of her decorations. Liz is relived the painting can be restored, but Phyllis has already "fixed" it with her own style.
6	"Eternal Sunshine of Phyllis's Mind"	Christine Gernon	Jonathan Green & Gabe Miller	November 12, 2026	TBD
Max notices Jesse is mind wiping Phyllis to avoid everyday arguments. Liz points out communication is important and the power of make-up sex after a fight. Jesse tries this and he and Phyllis love the sex. He decides to tell her the truth about everyone being vampires but she freaks out. Emma uses one of her powers of freezing humans. Charles and Liz have Jesse wipe Phyllis again, else she tell people or they be found by werewolves or vampire hunters. Max wants to share a room with Emma. Emma says they should ask Charles but actually wants Charles to say no, as she's not ready for that. Charles says yes, to cause problems. Max respects Emma's boundaries which makes her feel ready. They share a bed, though Max is unsettled she sleeps upside down from the ceiling. Henry and Mort tell Jesse they don't want to lie to their mother anymore. Jesse drives Phyllis out to the middle of nowhere to tell her again about the coven, and she runs away screaming.
7	"Jesse's Girl"	Christine Gernon	Caroline Fox	November 19, 2026	TBD
Phyllis calms down and is brought back to the house. Now that a human knows about them, Charles must call the vampire Council of Elders and Phyllis must sign a non-disclosure scroll. Phyllis sneaks out the window once Jesse admits to wiping her mind. Max is taking a mandatory class for new vampires and loves it though annoys Emma by being a know-it-all. Emma decides to get him back by claiming Harry Potter is also real. A representative from the Council comes for Phyllis to sign and confirm she is not a security threat to vampires; if she is, her mind will be deep-wiped and permanently destroyed. As Charles and Emma distract the representative, Jesse and Liz finds Phyllis with friends at a restaurant. Jesse wins Phyllis back by saying she is his 9th wife, but the only one he told the truth to. An embarrassed Max returns and stalls the representative long enough with technical knowledge of vampire law for Phyllis to return. She accepts them as vampires but confuses their lore with zombies and werewolves.
8	"Guess Who's Coven to Dinner"	Pete Chatmon	Skander Halim	December 3, 2026	TBD
9	"Merry Cursemas"	Pete Chatmon	Melissa Hunter	December 10, 2026	TBD

== Release ==
Eternally Yours premiered on CBS on October 8, 2026, in the Thursday 8:30 p.m. ET slot, between Georgie & Mandy's First Marriage and Elsbeth. The premiere date was announced at San Diego Comic-Con in 2026, where the series was screened ahead of a panel discussion. The slot was previously occupied by Ghosts, which CBS moved to midseason. Episodes stream live on Paramount+ for premium-tier subscribers and become available the following day on all plans.

== Reception ==
On the review aggregator website Rotten Tomatoes, the series holds an approval rating of 75%, based on 8 reviews, with an average of rated reviews of 7.3/10. Metacritic, which uses a weighted average, assigned a score of 59 out of 100 based on 6 critics, indicating "mixed or average" reviews.
