= Owen Daniels (actor) =

American actor and television writer

- Occupations: Actor; writer; drummer
- Years active: 2007–present
- Parents: Greg Daniels (father); Susanne Daniels (mother)
- Relatives: Paul Lieberstein (uncle); Warren Lieberstein (uncle)

Owen Daniels is an American actor and television writer. He is best known for his roles in Space Force and Upload.

== Career ==
As a child, Daniels also made appearances in two episodes of The Office, which (along with Space Force and Upload) was developed by his father Greg Daniels.

== Filmography ==
=== Film ===
Year	Title	Role	Notes
2011	Bridesmaids	Obnoxious Ice Skater	Uncredited

=== Television ===
Year	Title	Role	Notes
2007, 2010	The Office	Teddy, Eight-Year-Old Kid	2 episodes
2018	Youth & Consequences	Ron	Episode: "Narc-ish"
2018	Arrested Development	Google Chat #1	Episode: "Everyone Gets Atrophy"
2018	Family Guy	Vaper (voice)	Episode: "Dead Dog Walking"
2020–2022	Space Force	Obie Hanrahan	10 episodes
2020–2025	Upload	A.I. Guy	29 episodes

== Production credits ==
Year	Title	Director	Writer	Producer	Notes
2020–2022	Space Force	No	Yes	No	
2020–2025	Upload	No	Yes	Yes	
