= Greg Daniels =

American screenwriter, television producer, and director (born 1963)

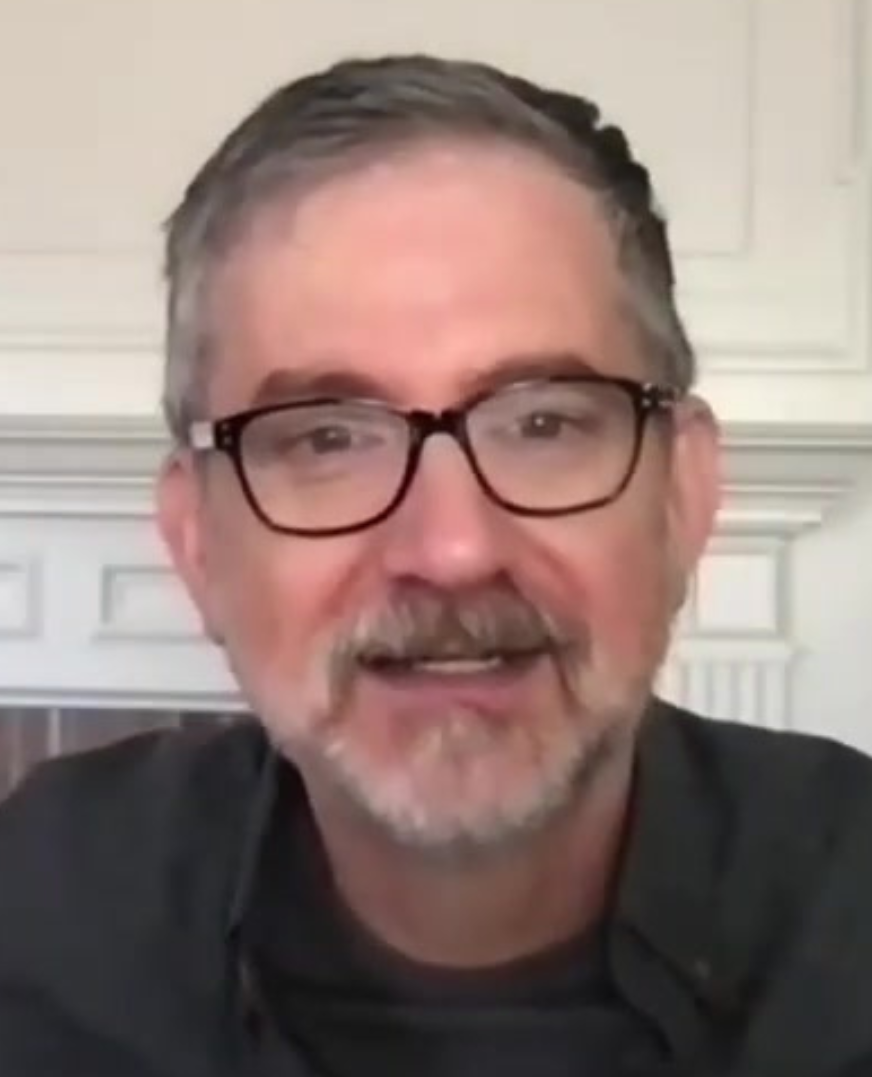
- Daniels in 2022
- Born: Gregory Martin Daniels; June 13, 1963 (age 63); New York City, U.S.
- Education: Harvard University
- Occupations: Screenwriter; television producer; director
- Spouse: Susanne Lieberstein (m. 1991)
- Children: 4, including Owen
- Relatives: Paul Lieberstein (brother-in-law); Warren Lieberstein (brother-in-law)
- Writing career
- Period: 1987–present
- Notable works: King of the Hill; The Office; Parks and Recreation

Gregory Martin "Greg" Daniels (born June 13, 1963) is an American screenwriter, television producer, and director. He has worked on several television series, including writing for Saturday Night Live and The Simpsons, adapting The Office for the United States, and co-creating Parks and Recreation and King of the Hill. Daniels attended Harvard University, where he befriended and began collaborating with Conan O'Brien. His first writing credit was for Not Necessarily the News, before he was laid off because of budget cuts.

He joined the writing staff of The Simpsons during its fifth season. He wrote several classic episodes, including "Secrets of a Successful Marriage", "Lisa's Wedding" and "Bart Sells His Soul" and supervised "22 Short Films About Springfield". He left The Simpsons to co-create another long-running animated series, King of the Hill, with Mike Judge. The show ran thirteen years before its cancellation in 2009. During the run of King of the Hill, he worked on several other series, including the American version of The Office and Parks and Recreation. In 2016, he was an executive producer on the TBS series People of Earth. With The Office star Steve Carell, Daniels co-created the Netflix comedy series Space Force. He also created the Amazon science fiction comedy series Upload. In 2025, Daniels' new series The Paper premiered.

== Early life and education ==
Gregory Martin Daniels was born on June 13, 1963, in New York City, the son of Judy, who worked at the New York Public Library, and Aaron Daniels, who was president of ABC Radio Network. Daniels' father is of Russian-Jewish descent.

Daniels stated that he became interested in comedy by watching Monty Python's Flying Circus as a child, as well as reading books by humorist S.J. Perelman at age 11. His first joke was a Carnac the Magnificent joke for his father which was later used for The Office episode, "The Dundies".

Daniels attended Phillips Exeter Academy and then Harvard University where he wrote for the Harvard Lampoon with Conan O'Brien. After graduating in 1985, the two accepted jobs at Not Necessarily the News, but they were soon fired due to budget cuts.

== Career ==
=== Work at Saturday Night Live and The Simpsons ===
Daniels and O'Brien met Lorne Michaels in late 1987 and were given a three-week try-out in the Saturday Night Live writing staff. While on the staff, Daniels won an Emmy Award for Outstanding Writing for a Variety, Music or Comedy Program. Daniels left the writing staff in 1990.

==== The Simpsons ====
Daniels joined the writing staff of the Fox show The Simpsons in 1993. He was hired in the fifth season following the departures of many of the original team of writers. His first day on the series coincided with O'Brien's last.

When he initially joined the series, he believed the series had gone past the "glory years" and that he had "missed the boat". In the fifth season, Daniels penned "Homer and Apu", "Secrets of a Successful Marriage", and "The Devil and Homer Simpson" segment of "Treehouse of Horror IV".

Daniels received an Emmy nomination in the "Outstanding Individual Achievement in Music and Lyrics" category for the song "Who Needs The Kwik-E-Mart?" from "Homer and Apu". For season six, he wrote "Homer Badman", "Lisa's Wedding" and the "Time and Punishment" segment from "Treehouse of Horror V". "Lisa's Wedding" became the third of the series to win a Primetime Emmy Award for Outstanding Animated Program. In the seventh season, Daniels wrote "Bart Sells His Soul", which was based on a childhood experience. His final credit for the series was for "22 Short Films About Springfield", which he served as supervising writer alongside showrunner Josh Weinstein. They were given the responsibility of linking all the stories together.

=== Initial work on King of the Hill, The Office and Parks and Recreation (1997–2015) ===
==== King of the Hill ====
Daniels left The Simpsons to work on King of the Hill (another Fox show) alongside Mike Judge. Daniels rewrote the pilot script and created several important characters that did not appear in Judge's first draft (including Luanne and Cotton), as well as some characterization ideas (e.g., making Dale Gribble a conspiracy theorist).

Daniels also took the writers to Texas to do some research with reporter notebooks, a process he would use for The Office and Parks and Recreation. Judge was ultimately so pleased with Daniels' contributions that he chose to credit him as a co-creator, rather than give him the "developer" credit usually reserved for individuals brought on to a pilot written by someone else. During the fifth and sixth seasons, Judge and Daniels became less involved with the show. They eventually focused on the show again, although Daniels steadily became more involved with other projects.

==== The Office and Parks and Recreation ====
In 2005, Daniels adapted the popular BBC mockumentary series The Office for American audiences. The series premiered to mixed reviews, so the writers worked to make it more "optimistic" and make the lead character, Michael Scott, more likable. The second season was significantly better received and it was named the second best TV series of 2006 by James Poniewozik, writing that "Producer Greg Daniels created not a copy but an interpretation that sends up distinctly American work conventions ... with a tone that's more satiric and less mordant. ... The new boss is different from the old boss, and that's fine by me." He gave the acceptance speech at the 58th Annual Primetime Emmy Awards when the American version of The Office won the award for Outstanding Comedy Series, and he received an award for Outstanding Writing for a Comedy Series at the 59th Annual Primetime Emmy Awards.

Following the success of The Office, Ben Silverman asked Daniels to create a spin-off for the series. After considering several ideas, Daniels and co-creator Michael Schur eventually decided that the series would not get a spin-off because Daniels and Schur "couldn't find the right fit". After Amy Poehler agreed to play the lead, they decided their new series would revolve around an optimistic female bureaucrat in small-town government. The premise of Parks and Recreation was partly inspired by the portrayal of local politics on the HBO drama series The Wire, as well as the renewed interest in and optimism about politics stemming from the 2008 United States presidential election. The series initially received mixed reviews, much like The Office in the first season, but after a re-approach to its format and tone, the later seasons received critical acclaim. For four years, he split his time between The Office and Parks and Recreation, before eventually returning as full-time showrunner for The Office for its ninth and final season.

=== Subsequent projects and Bandera Entertainment (2012–present) ===
In 2011, Daniels made a deal with NBC to produce several series for Universal Television. He also developed the British series Friday Night Dinner for American audiences. The remake was picked up for a pilot, which was written by Daniels and directed by Ken Kwapis, and featured Allison Janney and Tony Shalhoub as the mother and father. The pilot was not picked up for series. He also teamed with Mindy Kaling and Alan Yang to work on two different animated series for NBC and made a deal to executive produce a new pilot written by The Office writer Owen Ellickson and starring The Office cast member Craig Robinson. He served as director and executive producer on the TBS series People of Earth. In January 2019, Netflix announced that he would write and produce a new series called Space Force starring Steve Carell, who was the lead in Daniels' previous sitcom The Office. He created the Amazon original sci-fi series Upload which started streaming in May 2020.

==== Bandera Entertainment ====
In 2021, it was announced that Daniels and King of the Hill co-creator Mike Judge had reunited to form an animation company called Bandera Entertainment, to "expand the format to include as many subgenres as live-action fare." Their first produced series was Anna Drezen's Praise Petey starring Annie Murphy, John Cho, and frequent Judge collaborator Stephen Root among others. The series premiered on July 21, 2023, on Freeform and Hulu, and received mostly positive reviews, with Rotten Tomatoes ratings of 80% Fresh from critics, and 90% Fresh from audiences. Other series produced by Daniels and Judge include an adaptation of Exploding Kittens for Netflix, a reboot of King of the Hill for Hulu which premiered on August 4, 2025, Zach Woods and Brandon Gardner's In the Know, and Common Side Effects for Adult Swim.

Other series in development from Daniels and Judge include Caitie Delaney and Caleb Hearon's Best Buds for Peacock and Chelm: The Smartest Place on Earth with Sacha Baron Cohen for Cartoon Network and Max. They were also producing Nicole Silverberg's Bad Crimes, starring Nicole Byer and Lauren Lapkus for Netflix, but it was canceled mid-production.

== Personal life ==
Daniels met Susanne Dari Lieberstein while she was Lorne Michaels' assistant at Saturday Night Live and they eventually married. She is the sister of Paul Lieberstein, writer for King of the Hill and the replacement showrunner of The Office for Daniels. Daniels was also the brother-in-law to The Office cast member Angela Kinsey until her divorce from The Office writer Warren Lieberstein in 2010.

== Accolades ==
=== Reception ===
Daniels's work has received a mainly positive reception. Out of the six TV series that Daniels has worked on, four of them—Saturday Night Live, The Simpsons, King of the Hill and The Office—were named among Time reviewer James Poniewozik's All Time 100 TV Shows. His work on The Simpsons has received acclaim from critics and fans. Two of his episodes, "Bart Sells His Soul" and "22 Short Films About Springfield", were listed among the show's creative team's top five favorite episodes in 2003. Series creator Matt Groening and executive producer James L. Brooks have named his episodes among their favorites. Other staff members and several critics have praised his work.

His other animated series and his first credit as a creator, King of the Hill, has received positive reviews as well. IGN named it the 27th best-animated television series and the site mainly complimented the series for its subtle character humor.

No one seems to nail these characters like Daniels does. It was a daunting challenge to write off Michael in a way that was emotionally satisfying, true to the spirit of the show, but also funny. Daniels expertly walked that tightrope and threw in some treats for longtime fans as well.

— Cindy White, IGN

His next television series, The Office, ranked as NBC's highest rated show for a majority of its run, according to the Nielsen ratings. The series has also been put on several top series lists by many publications including Time, BuddyTV, Metacritic, The Washington Post, and Paste. His writing credits for the series are often considered the best of the series. Despite its early acclaim, later seasons have received criticism for a dip in quality, notably after Daniels was less involved. Daniels' next series, Parks and Recreation, was called "the smartest comedy on TV" by Entertainment Weekly in 2011.

=== Awards ===
Daniels has been nominated for twenty-one Emmys and has won five. Those wins are for:

- Outstanding Writing for a Variety, Music or Comedy Program for his work on Saturday Night Live: Season 14 (1989)
- Outstanding Animated Program for the Simpsons episode, "Lisa's Wedding" (1995)
- Outstanding Animated Program for King of The Hill, "And They Call It Bobby Love" (1999)
- Outstanding Comedy Series for The Office: Season 2 (2006)
- Outstanding Writing for a Comedy Series for "Gay Witch Hunt" from The Office. (2007)

Daniels was also awarded Austin Film Festival's Outstanding Television Writer Award in 2008.

== Filmography ==
Year	Title	Creator	Director	Showrunner	Writer	Executive Producer	Notes
1985–1987	Not Necessarily the News	No	No	No	Yes (8)	No	Sketches Show
1987–1988	The Wilton North Report	No	No	No	Yes (21)	No	Live Show
1987–1990	Saturday Night Live	No	No	No	Yes (53)	No	Live Show
1992	Seinfeld	No	No	No	Yes (1)	No	
1993–1998	The Simpsons	No	No	No	Yes (8)	Co-executive producer (29)	Also produced 25 episodes and co-produced 22 episodes
1997–2010, 2025–present	King of the Hill	Yes	No	Yes (85)	Yes (3)	Yes	Co-created with Mike Judge
2000	Life's Too Short	Yes	No	No	Yes	Yes	
2000	Monsignor Martínez	Yes	No	No	Yes	Yes	TV pilot
2003	A.U.S.A	No	No	No	No	Consulting producer	
2005–2013	The Office	Developer	Yes (13)	Yes (97)	Yes (13)	Yes	Also produced 29 episodes; Based on the show The Office by Ricky Gervais and Stephen Merchant
2009–2015	Parks and Recreation	Yes	Yes (3)	No	Yes (1)	Yes	Co-created with Michael Schur
2012	Friday Night Dinner	Yes	No	Yes	Yes	Yes	TV pilot; Co-created with Robert Popper
2013	The Mindy Project	No	Yes (1)	No	No	No	
2013	Hello Ladies	No	Yes (1)	No	No	No	
2016–2017	People of Earth	No	Yes (2)	No	No	Yes	
2020	A Parks and Recreation Special	Yes	No	No	No	Yes	Co-created with Michael Schur
2020–2025	Upload	Yes	Yes (2)	Yes (17)	Yes (4)	Yes	
2020–2022	Space Force	Yes	No	Yes (17)	Yes (3)	Yes	Co-created with Steve Carell
2023	Praise Petey	No	No	No	No	Yes	Executive producer with Mike Judge
2024	In the Know	No	No	No	No	Yes	Executive producer with Mike Judge
2024	Exploding Kittens	No	No	No	No	Yes	Executive producer with Mike Judge
2025–present	Common Side Effects	No	No	No	No	Yes	Executive producer with Mike Judge
2025–present	The Paper	Yes	Yes (1)	Yes	Yes (2)	Yes	Co-created with Michael Koman
