= The Cover-Up (The Office) =

- The Office episode
- Episode no.: Season 6 Episode 24
- Directed by: Rainn Wilson
- Written by: Lee Eisenberg; Gene Stupnitsky
- Cinematography by: Randall Einhorn
- Editing by: Claire Scanlon
- Production code: 624
- Original air date: May 6, 2010

Guest appearances
- Hugh Dane as Hank Tate; Amy Pietz as Donna Newton; Zach Woods as Gabe Lewis

Episode chronology
← Previous "Body Language"	Next → "The Chump"
- The Office (American season 6)

"The Cover-Up" is the twenty-fourth episode of the sixth season of the American comedy series The Office. It aired on May 6, 2010 on NBC in the United States.

In the episode, Michael suspects Donna is cheating on him, and he pays Dwight $50 plus expenses to investigate. Meanwhile, Darryl pranks Andy into believing he has uncovered a company conspiracy.

The episode was written by Lee Eisenberg and Gene Stupnitsky, their third writing credit of the season after "The Lover" and "Scott's Tots." It was directed by Rainn Wilson, who also portrays Dwight Schrute on the show, marking his television directorial debut.

== Plot ==
Michael Scott is in good spirits due to his wildly successful relationship with Donna. He calls an office meeting solely to get suggestions for their next date, but the meeting participants, particularly Ryan Howard and Kelly Kapoor, convince him that she might be cheating on him. Worried, Michael hires Dwight Schrute to tail her to see if she spends time with anyone else. Dwight follows Donna to her gym and attempts to seduce her. Donna rebukes him and calls security on him, whereby he openly admits he was sent there by Michael to keep tabs on her. An enraged Donna comes to the office to talk to Michael about the whole situation, and the two forgive each other and reconcile by planning a private vacation together.

Andy Bernard receives a call from a concerned client that a Sabre printer caught fire during a routine operation. He becomes frustrated when Gabe Lewis fails to take his client's complaint seriously. Capitalizing on his fears, Darryl Philbin pranks Andy into believing he has uncovered a conspiracy as revenge for Andy pinning one of his mistakes on the warehouse a few years prior. He pays Creed Bratton $3 to threaten him, and further convinces Andy that the conspirators intend to kill him. Gabe eventually tells Andy that he consulted corporate, who confirmed that only 12 out of 400,000 printers have caught fire, and gives Andy a $5 gift card as thanks for bringing the matter to their attention. This assuages Andy's suspicions, but Darryl is still able to convince him that he needs to go public with proof that the printers are faulty. He films Andy testing the printer in normal use. Though Darryl intends to use the video to further embarrass Andy, the printer indeed catches fire and explodes. This confirms Andy's suspicions, and scares Darryl straight.

While Donna and Michael are planning their trip, Pam Halpert becomes suspicious when she notices Donna wearing heart-shaped jewelry that Michael did not buy for her. She snoops around on Facebook, and finds recent pictures of Donna hugging and kissing another man. Pam shows Michael the pictures, and he confronts Donna with the evidence. Donna admits to cheating and reveals that it is Michael who is the "other guy"; the photos are of her and her husband.

== Production ==
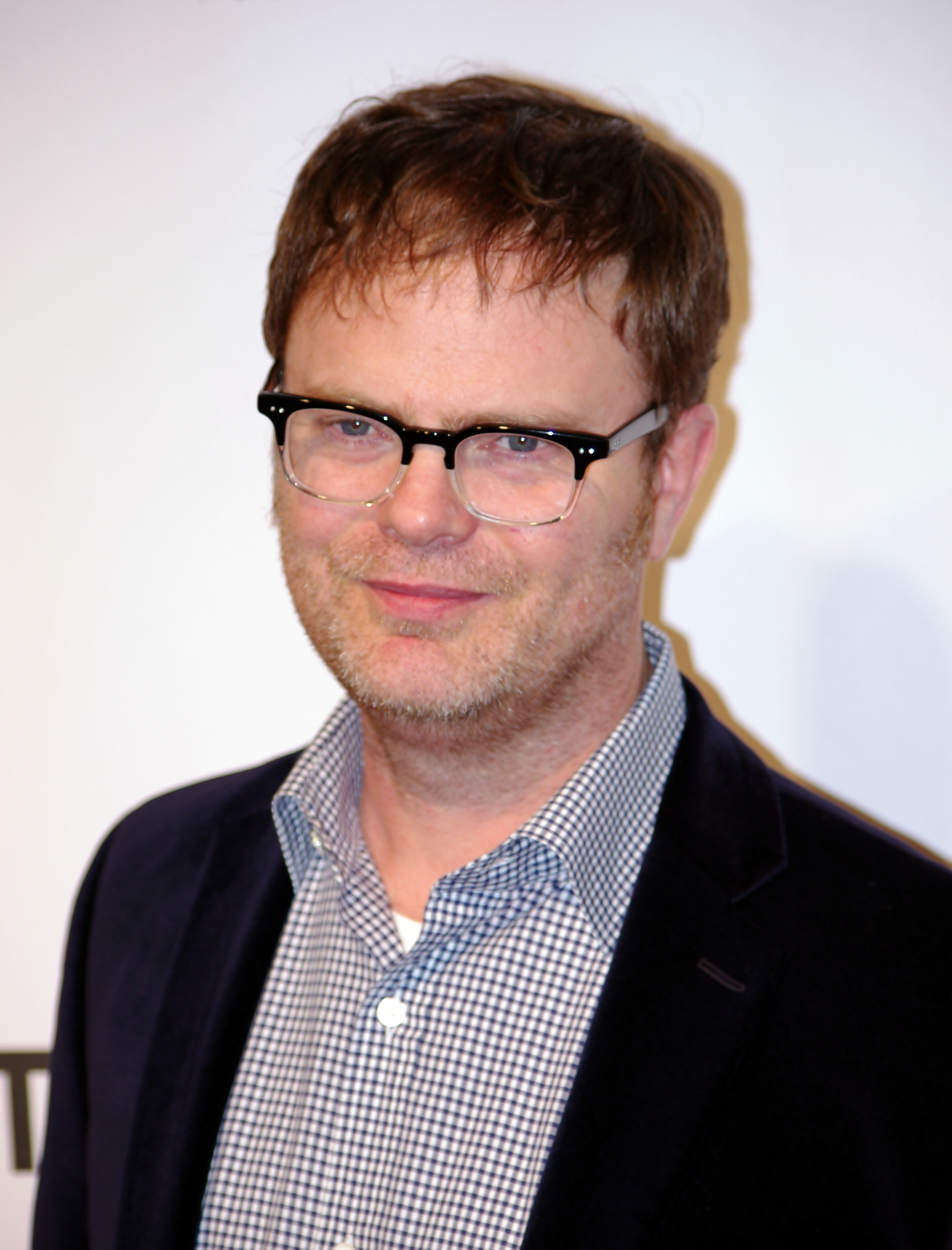
Rainn Wilson, who plays Dwight Schrute, made his television directorial debut with this episode.

The episode was written by Lee Eisenberg and Gene Stupnitsky, their third writing credit of the season after "The Lover" and "Scott's Tots." It was directed by Rainn Wilson, who also portrays Dwight Schrute on the show, marking his television directorial debut. He is the fourth actor of the series to make a directorial debut this season after B. J. Novak, John Krasinski, and Mindy Kaling. Cast members Steve Carell and Paul Lieberstein also directed episodes this season, though they had previously directed for the series. This episode was dedicated to the memory of Larry Einhorn, whose son, Randall Einhorn, had directed 11 previous episodes of the series, served as this episode's consultant and cinematographer, and went on to direct other episodes including the next episode.

None of the actors learned Morse code for the cold open, and were simply clicking and blinking at random; the script did not even specify how long they should click for each communication. The pen Jim clicks with was a Parker Jotter. The Parker Jotter is frequently used in films and TV shows, in part because of its exceptionally loud and crisp clicking sound, which made it particularly suited for a scene where its clicking is used to annoy a character.

The gym's interiors and exteriors were both filmed on location at 360 Health Club in Reseda, Los Angeles. The printer catching on fire was accomplished with a remote-controlled safe smoke generator, with squibs to create the sparks.

== Reception ==
In its original American broadcast, "The Cover-Up" was watched by 6.84 million viewers with a 3.5 rating and a 10 share in the 18–49 demographic.

Cindy White of IGN gave the episode an 8.0/10, saying it was "Impressive" and "While 'The Cover-Up' did manage to move along two story threads leading up to the end of the season, it wasn't really a standout episode, especially in contrast to last week's. There weren't as many quotable lines or memorable moments as I usually expect from The Office.” Leonard Pierce of The A.V. Club gave the episode an A−, writing "It's an extremely adept episode, skillfully blending its themes with a solid structure and tons of good jokes in a way that this season has rarely achieved", but said the episode wasn't as good as the other NBC Comedy Night Done Right shows, Community and Parks and Recreation. Darren Franich of Entertainment Weekly said "The episode was called 'The Cover-Up,' and even if it didn’t quite follow through on the promise of that opening scene, it was a good little ditty." James Poniewozik of Time gave the episode a positive review writing "Credit to the show for setting that up (Michael realizing he is a mistress), though it eluded me and, I suppose, everyone else not versed in the secret signals of heart-shaped jewelry.

Steve Carell submitted this episode for Emmy voting when he was nominated for the Primetime Emmy Award for Outstanding Lead Actor in a Comedy Series.
