= The Return (The Office) =

- The Office episode
- Episode no.: Season 3 Episode 14
- Directed by: Greg Daniels
- Written by: Michael Schur; Lee Eisenberg; Gene Stupnitsky
- Cinematography by: Randall Einhorn
- Editing by: Dean Holland
- Production code: 313
- Original air date: January 18, 2007
- Running time: 28 minutes

Guest appearances
- Creed Bratton as Creed Bratton; Ed Helms as Andy Bernard; Rashida Jones as Karen Filippelli; Yvette Nicole Brown as Paris

Episode chronology
| ← Previous "Traveling Salesmen" | Next → "Ben Franklin" |
- The Office (American TV series) season 3

"The Return" (originally titled "Oscar's Return") is the fourteenth episode of the third season of the American version of The Office and the show's 42nd overall. In the episode, the office celebrates the return of Oscar Martinez (Oscar Nunez) who had been on vacation since the first episode of the season. Meanwhile, a recently departed Dwight Schrute (Rainn Wilson) finds a job at Staples.

The episode was written by Michael Schur, Lee Eisenberg, and Gene Stupnitsky, and it was directed by series creator Greg Daniels. Actor Oscar Nunez returned to The Office after having left to film the television series Halfway Home. The annoying personality of Ed Helms's character Andy was noted by multiple observers, and even irritated the actor's own mother to such a degree that she could not watch the episode. "The Return" marked Helms' departure from The Office until the season's nineteenth episode "Safety Training".

For its first American broadcast on January 18, 2007 on NBC, "The Return" aired to an estimated 10.15 million viewers according to Nielsen Media Research. It was positively received by television critics, with several focusing on the character development of Angela Martin (Angela Kinsey). Along with "Traveling Salesmen", NBC later re-broadcast "The Return" as a combined hour-long episode as part of their sweeps week. As a result, both episodes underwent editing which included the addition of four minutes of previously unseen footage.

== Plot ==
Having quit Dunder Mifflin, Dwight Schrute settles for a job at Staples. Andy Bernard relishes the thought of becoming Michael Scott's new Number Three and begins to pester Michael for attention. When Andy begins to irritate his co-workers, Jim Halpert, after getting no support from Karen Filippelli or Ryan Howard, recruits Pam Beesly to play a prank on Andy by hiding his cell phone (which plays "Rockin' Robin", sung a cappella by Andy himself) in the ceiling and continually calling it.

Meanwhile, Oscar Martinez returns to the office from his leave of absence, and Michael wants to celebrate by asking the Party Planning Committee to throw a Mexican-themed fiesta that includes firecrackers, a chihuahua and a donkey. Later, as Jim and Pam continue to call Andy's hidden cell phone, he is pushed over the edge by the combination of Jim and Pam's prank and Michael's rejection of his friendship, and in a fit of rage punches a hole in the wall.

When Angela Martin finally reveals to Michael that she was the cause of Dwight's secret visit to Corporate, Michael realizes his error in forcing Dwight out and goes to Staples to ask him to return to Dunder Mifflin. Angela was worried that Michael would realize the two were involved in a romantic relationship, but Michael believes that Dwight saved Angela out of loyalty to the company. Dwight returns to the office and, much to his delight, thinks Oscar's welcome back party is actually meant for him.

Karen has noticed how much fun Jim and Pam had together during their prank on Andy; she confronts Jim and asks him if he still has feelings for Pam. Jim nods as he quietly says yes and Karen walks out of the room, visibly upset. Meanwhile, corporate sends Andy to anger management where he plans to get out of the 10-week program in five weeks through his usual charms: name repetition and personality imitation.

== Production ==
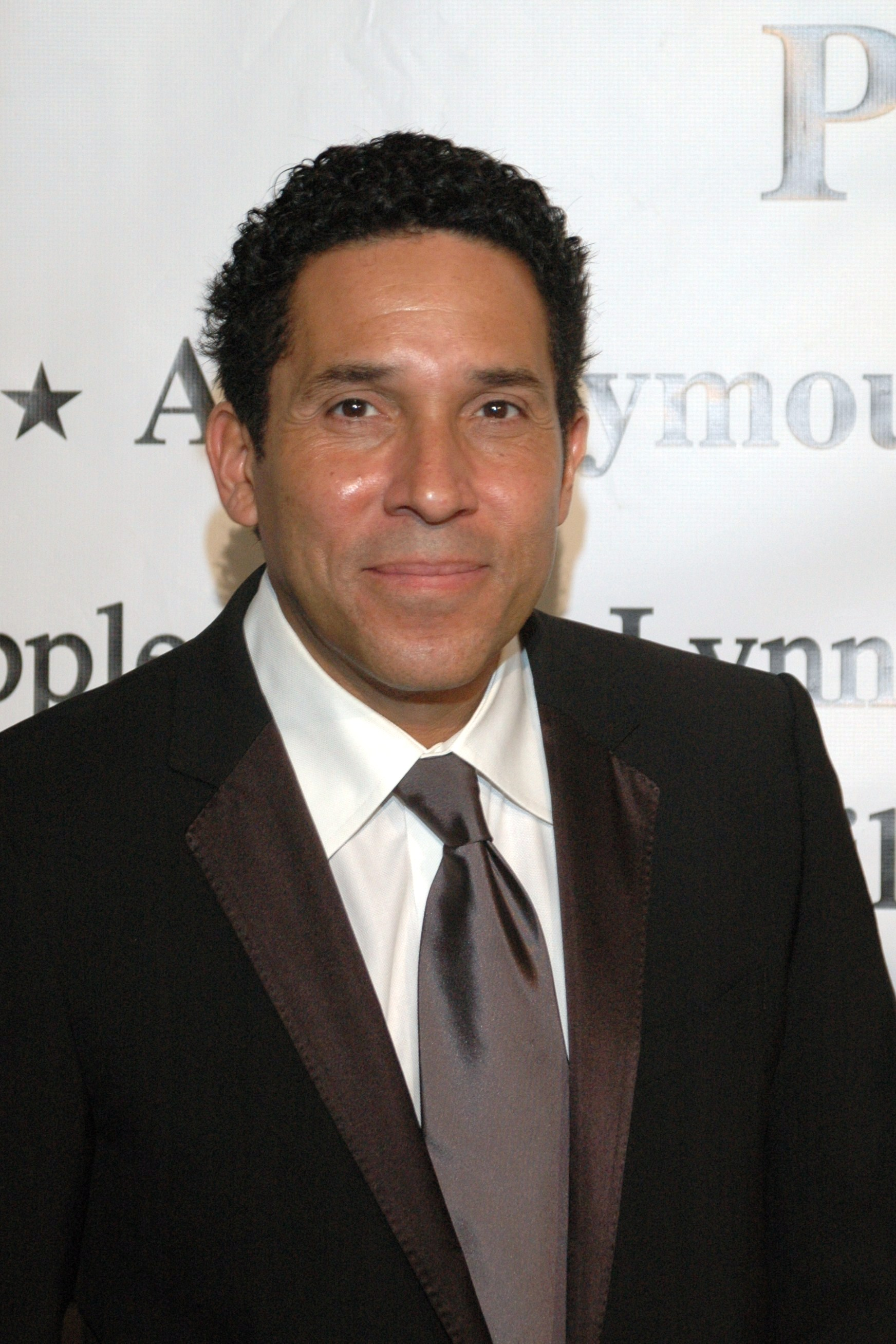
"The Return" marked the reappearance of Oscar Nunez, who left The Office to work on the television series Halfway Home.

"The Return" was written by Michael Schur, Lee Eisenberg, and Gene Stupnitsky, while series creator and executive producer Greg Daniels directed and Dean Holland edited. The original title of this episode was "Oscar's Return", a reference to the reappearance of actor Oscar Nunez, who had temporarily left the series after the season premiere. Nunez spent the interim working on the Comedy Central series Halfway Home. It was the last episode Daniels filmed before the Thanksgiving holiday, the start of an eight-week break for the cast and crew.

Then-president of NBC Entertainment Kevin Reilly played Dwight's first interviewer. Ed Helms noted in the audio commentary that his mother had trouble watching a string of episodes that included "The Return" because she found his character so annoying. Helms recorded the self-recorded cellphone ring on his own personal computer. For the big anger scene, Helms actually bloodied his knuckles while punching the wall, something that took five or six takes. Steve Carell and Rainn Wilson had difficulty with their reuniting scene and had to stage it in several different ways. As part of the episode is set in one of their stores, office supply chain Staples Inc. watched the episode carefully to ensure they were not portrayed negatively; they were particularly afraid that Dwight's manner of quitting was disrespectful to the company. At the time "The Return" aired, no one was certain Helms would be returning. In early February, NBC confirmed Helms had been hired on as a series regular for the rest of the year, with the actor returning in the season's nineteenth episode, "The Negotiation".

"The Return" was later rebroadcast with "Traveling Salesmen" as a combined hour-long episode, on March 15, 2007. NBC added previously unaired and re-edited scenes into the episode, which was perceived by one commentator as a method to "boost the ratings during the content dearth known as repeat week, giving its replays a creative twist". Greg Daniels explained that in addition to the attempt to attract a larger audience, "it's about giving something extra to our wonderful fans…their loyalty must be rewarded somehow, and we don't have the budget for 10 million muffin baskets."

== Cultural references ==
Andy tells Michael he is going to "get my Lost on", a reference to the ABC science fiction drama television series. Andy sings The Cranberries' 1994 hit song "Zombie", which was the most annoying song Helms and Krasinski could think of for Andy to sing. Dwight later returns to the office wearing a sweatshirt prominently displaying Battlestar Galactica, a Syfy military science fiction television series. When referring to Andy's weirdness, Michael mentions radio broadcaster Marv Albert, who was convicted of sexual assault in the late 1990s.

== Reception ==
"The Return" first aired on January 18, 2007 in the United States on NBC. According to Nielsen Media Research, the episode was watched by an estimated 10.15 million viewers. The Office and its lead-in My Name Is Earl finished first in the 18–49 demographic against its time slot competitors, though it was not enough to prevent the overall network from finishing in third place among total viewers. The same day as the episode broadcast, NBC renewed The Office for a full fourth season, which came as no surprise to media pundits.

Beginning his review, Buddy TV's Oscar Dahl declared Andy was "one of the most devastatingly annoying characters on television". Dahl liked Dwight's scenes at Staples, and wrote that series was becoming "more and more difficult to write about. It's really funny. Consistently funny. Great episodes, week after week, breed little in the way of discussion [...] We have to appreciate greatness while it's here. The Office is in the midst of a historic run of consistently great episodes. Bask in it." AOL TV writer Michael Sciannamea agreed with Dahl's initial assessment of Andy, and called him the "most obnoxious sitcom character in the last few years". Sciannamea enjoyed seeing more of Angela's and Michael's personalities, and believed Andy was a "short-timer" to the series.

Entertainment Weekly contributor Abby West praised Angela Kinsey's performance, noting that she "brought wonderful contradictions to her prickly office priss". West also enjoyed the love triangle for being "so skillfully kept as the subplot it should be. It is as much due to the light touches of the three actors as to the writers... It's refreshing that Jim and Karen have mostly been so mature and honest, but that's a sure sign that the relationship will devolve, because the setup for the success for most long-term TV romances requires miscommunication and no confrontation." In his review of the third season, Travis Fickett of IGN highlighted a scene of the episode; he commented, "Watching Andy slowly meltdown when he can't find his cell phone is one of the better moments of the season."
