= Traveling Salesmen =

- The Office episode
- Episode no.: Season 3 Episode 13
- Directed by: Greg Daniels
- Written by: Michael Schur; Lee Eisenberg; Gene Stupnitsky
- Cinematography by: Randall Einhorn
- Editing by: David Rogers
- Production code: 312
- Original air date: January 11, 2007
- Running time: 21 minutes

Guest appearances
- Creed Bratton as Creed Bratton; Ed Helms as Andy Bernard; Rashida Jones as Karen Filippelli

Episode chronology
← Previous "Back from Vacation"	Next → "The Return"
- The Office (American season 3)

"Traveling Salesmen" is the thirteenth episode of the third season of the American version of The Office and the show's 41st overall. The episode was written by Michael Schur, Lee Eisenberg, and Gene Stupnitsky, and it was directed by series creator and executive producer Greg Daniels. It first aired on January 11, 2007 in the United States on NBC.

The series depicts the everyday lives of office employees in the Scranton, Pennsylvania branch of the fictional Dunder Mifflin Paper Company. In this episode, the sales team goes out on sales calls, with Michael Scott (Steve Carell) and Andy Bernard (Ed Helms), Stanley Hudson (Leslie David Baker) and Ryan Howard (B. J. Novak), Phyllis Lapin (Phyllis Smith) and Karen Filippelli (Rashida Jones), and Dwight Schrute (Rainn Wilson) and Jim Halpert (John Krasinski) pairing up. Andy tries to show Dwight in a bad light to Michael, Karen learns of Jim's previous crush on Pam Beesly (Jenna Fischer), and Angela Martin (Angela Kinsey) forgets to hand in some important documents to New York, so her secret boyfriend Dwight does it for her.

Krasinski believed "Traveling Salesmen" was the first episode to give a real glimpse into Dwight and Angela's relationship, and much of the plot centered on the two. It aired to an estimated 10.2 million viewers according to Nielsen Media Research. It was positively received by television critics. Along with "The Return", NBC later re-broadcast "Traveling Salesmen" as a combined hour-long episode as part of their sweeps week. As a result, both episodes underwent editing which included the addition of four minutes of previously unseen footage.

== Synopsis ==
Dwight Schrute arrives several hours late to work one morning, due to driving to New York City to help out Angela Martin.

Michael Scott has the sales department pair up for sales calls. Andy Bernard chooses Michael, Phyllis Lapin chooses Karen Filippelli, and Stanley Hudson chooses Ryan Howard, leaving Dwight with Jim Halpert, who he used to do sales calls with. Andy learns that Dwight does Michael's laundry as punishment for meeting with Jan to take over the branch. During their sales call, Andy sabotages the meeting, setting up an opportunity to later apologize to Michael, stating that he had really "Schruted" the situation, a further attempt to deride Dwight.

While the salespeople are out, Angela tells Pam Beesly how "Kurt" saved "Noelle" ("Kurt" and "Noelle" being Dwight's and Angela's middle names, respectively) by delivering the quarterly tax forms to New York.

At first, Jim's and Dwight's sales call appears to be a fiasco, but it is soon clear that the joint force of Jim's straight-and-honest sales approach, along with Dwight's aggressive, erratic tactics, is a very successful partnership. Ryan asks Stanley if he could lead on their call so Stanley can critique him. Stanley obliges. However, Ryan freezes up and fails when he realizes that Stanley's clients are all black. Stanley laughs at an annoyed Ryan during the entire trip back to the office. Phyllis and Karen first stop at a beauty parlor, emerging with gaudy makeovers. Their sales call is a success because, as Phyllis knew, the client likes women with that kind of look, as evidenced by the photo of his wife. Returning to the office, Phyllis tells Karen that she's pleased that Jim got over his crush on Pam. Karen confronts Jim with this information, and he reassures her that his crush has passed.

Upon returning after the sales call, Andy steals Dwight's keys, breaks into his car, and finds the toll booth ticket to New York City. Andy gives the evidence to Michael, who then accuses Dwight of disloyalty, and Angela prevents him from clearing his name because it would expose their relationship. Dwight resigns and hugs Jim on his way out. Andy gloats over his success, but the documentary camera catches Angela in the background glaring at him.

== Production ==
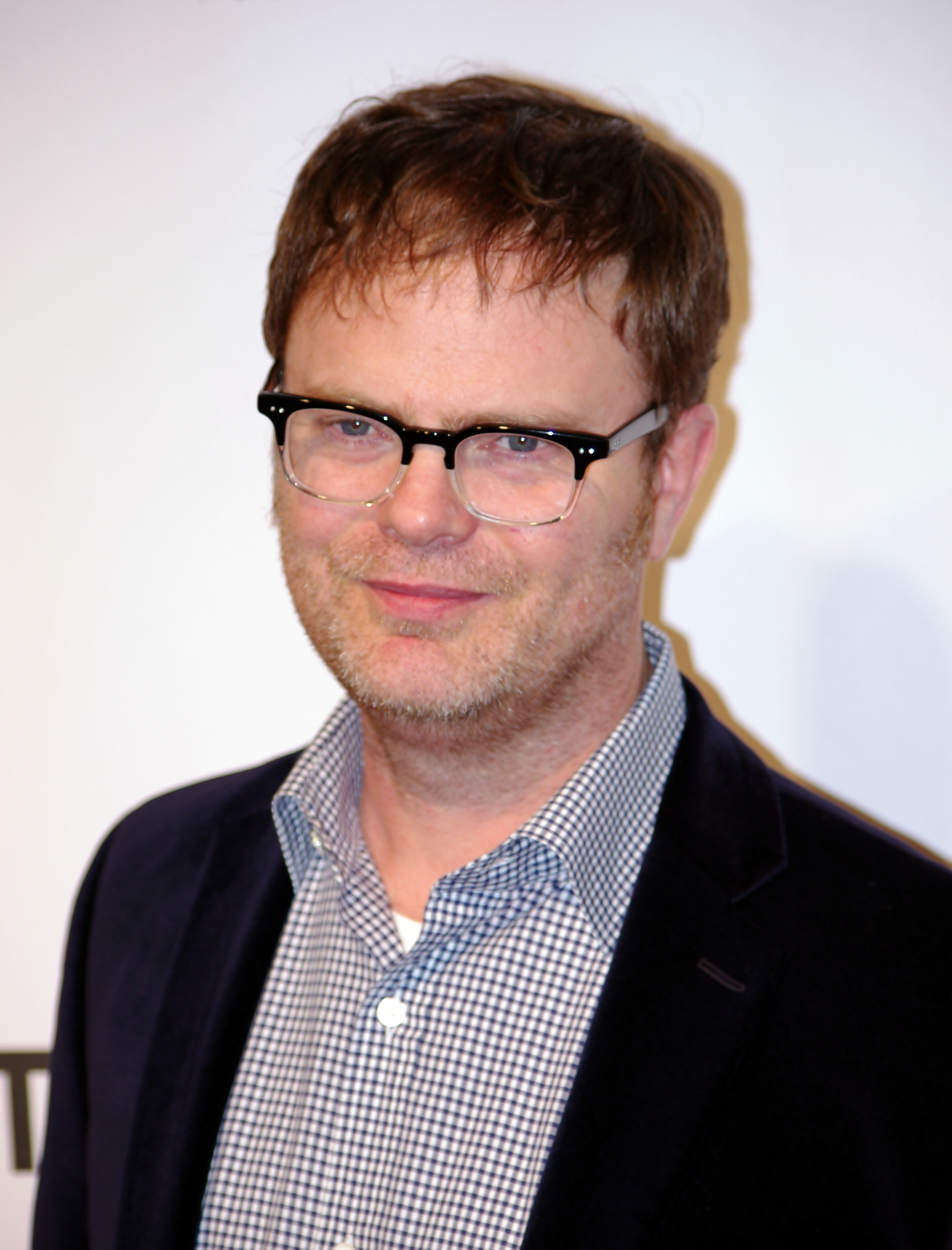
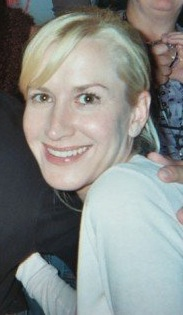
"Traveling Salesmen" partly centered around Dwight (left) and Angela's (right) ongoing relationship.

"Traveling Salesman" was written by Michael Schur, Lee Eisenberg, and Gene Stupnitsky, while co-creator and executive producer Greg Daniels directed. Daniels shot "Traveling Salesmen" and "The Return" in mid-November 2006 before the cast and crew began an eight-week break.

John Krasinski enjoyed the episode because he believed it was the first real glimpse of Angela and Dwight's relationship, with Rainn Wilson noting that the audience gets "to see how Dwight becomes her hero". As with other Office episodes, a number of scenes in "Traveling Salesmen" were improvised and unscripted, including Andy and Michael's sales pitch and Stanley laughing at Ryan in the car.

To create the old picture of Jim and Dwight, an actual high school photograph of Krasinski was photoshopped along with a 1991 image of Wilson while Wilson was on tour with an acting company. While standing in the parking lot, the cast had to pretend to shiver in 85 °F (29 °C) weather. Krasinski actually slapped Wilson at Wilson's request, which Krasinski considered "one of the craziest acting experiences I've ever had". Before deciding on singing to a melody from Willy Wonka and the Chocolate Factory, Ed Helms and Daniels shot 50 different versions. Another Willy Wonka reference includes Andy's mention of a chocolate factory and not wishing "to fall into any chocolate river".

"Traveling Salesmen" was later rebroadcast with "The Return" as a combined hour-long episode on March 15, 2007, with four minutes of previously unseen footage added. Greg Daniels explained that it was both an attempt to attract a larger audience and "it's about giving something extra to our wonderful fans…their loyalty must be rewarded somehow, and we don't have the budget for 10 million muffin baskets". As part of the editing process, Pam is seen winning an art contest, four scenes of Andy searching through Dwight's things were condensed, and a scene with Angela offering Pam one of her cat's kittens as well as an extended scene of Andy going to anger management were added. The third season DVD contains a number of deleted scenes, such as Michael using his computer, "Harvey", to hit on Pam (this scene was the cold open for "Traveling Salesman" on its original broadcast; the combined hour-long version of "Traveling Salesman" and "The Return" has no cold open). Notable cut scenes included Andy dramatically illustrating to Karen that they are the only two Stamford employees remaining, Jim and Dwight surreptitiously planning their sales tactic, Pam offering to get coffee for her co-workers, and Dwight emotionally giving away selected items to others in the office.

== Reception ==
"Traveling Salesmen" was first broadcast on January 11, 2007 in the United States on NBC. According to Nielsen Media Research, an estimated 10.2 million viewers tuned in, making it only a handful of other episodes of The Office to reach over 10 million viewers, the others being the show's pilot episode, "The Injury", "The Return," "Ben Franklin" and "Stress Relief," of which the latter reached over 20 million viewers.

Buddy TV senior writer Oscar Dahl remarked, "It didn't make me laugh out loud and, yet, I still loved it." He shed a negative light on Andy's behavior towards Dwight, calling it "annoying and not that funny". Dahl hoped Dwight would be reappearing soon, and concluded "Overall, a crucial story episode with a nice cliffhanger. Even if wasn't as funny as last week or even most episodes this season, The Office still entertains." AOL TV's Michael Sciannamea lauded the episode, writing "I cannot remember ever guffawing over every single line in a single sitcom episode as I did watching this one. If the performances in this particular one don't garner the actors in this show a plethora of Emmys, there ought to be an investigation." Sciannamea continued that he believed it was Steve Carell's best series performance thus far because he "displayed the full range of his personality—jokester, arrogant jerk, charming salesman, sensitive soul, and added a new one—anger."

Entertainment Weekly writer Abby West commented of Dwight's ouster, "There's no way Rainn Wilson is off the show, but it was a bold move to let him appear to be bested by the (slightly) more Machiavellian Andy. I can't wait to see how they play out this storyline." West referred to "Phyllis' expert psychological move" with the makeovers as her favorite subplot of the night, and appreciated the spotlight on the sales pairings; she expanded on this latter point, "The trip out of the office was also a great reminder of what these Dunder Mifflin-ers actually do and how good most of them are. Isn't it interesting that as much as they normally clash, Dwight and Jim make a very effective sales team, while the seeming bond that Michael and Andy share did nothing to keep Andy from punting their pitch? When Dwight started using the client's phone, Jim didn't skip a beat. They'd either used the ploy (of dialing the competition's customer service number and showing how long the wait time was) before, or Jim is comfortable going with Dwight's flow, at least in that kind of setting. They essentially played good cop/bad cop... or good cop/weird cop." Other television critics also praised the various sales call pairings.
