= Bad Teacher (TV series) =

- Genre: Sitcom; Black comedy
- Based on: Bad Teacher by: Lee Eisenberg; Gene Stupnitsky
- Developed by: Hilary Winston
- Starring: Ari Graynor; Sara Gilbert; Ryan Hansen; Sara Rodier; Kristin Davis; David Alan Grier
- Composer: Lyle Workman
- Country of origin: United States
- Original language: English
- No. of seasons: 1
- No. of episodes: 13

Production
- Executive producers: Hilary Winston; Lee Eisenberg; Gene Stupnitsky; Jimmy Miller; Sam Hansen; Michael Lasker
- Producers: Ari Graynor; Cameron Diaz
- Camera setup: Single-camera
- Running time: 21 minutes
- Production companies: Gifted and Talented Camp Productions; Mosaic Media Group; Quantity Entertainment; CBS Television Studios; Sony Pictures Television

Original release
- Network: CBS
- Release: April 24 – July 26, 2014

Bad Teacher is an American single-camera sitcom that aired in 2014, developed by Hilary Winston, and based on the 2011 film Bad Teacher. The series aired on CBS from April 24 to July 26, 2014.

On May 27, 2014, CBS, which had already canceled the show after three episodes, removed it from the schedule. However, the remaining episodes later aired as part of a summer burn off in July 2014.

== Plot ==
Meredith Davis is divorced from her rich husband, who leaves her with nothing due to a prenuptial agreement that she clearly did not read. She moves in with her friend's family, whose stepdaughter, Lily, inspires her to come up with a plan: Become hired as a teacher at Lily's school (the fictional Richard Nixon Middle School), meet and marry a rich single father, and return to the extravagant lifestyle to which she was accustomed.

Using a fake résumé and her feminine charm, she coaxes Principal Carl Gaines to hire her. The faculty includes Joel, a former high school classmate who is now a gym teacher; Irene, a shy fellow teacher who becomes excited to have a new friend; and Ginny, faculty president who resents Meredith and is suspicious of her.

Although an incompetent teacher, Meredith imparts life lessons to Lily and her friends.

== Cast ==
=== Main ===
- Ari Graynor as Meredith Davis, a former housewife who poses as a middle school teacher, in hopes to find a rich divorcé so that she can resume her upper-class lifestyle
- Sara Gilbert as Irene, a socially awkward teacher at Richard Nixon Middle School who is eager to become friends with Meredith
- Ryan Hansen as Joel Kotsky, the school's gym teacher who knows Meredith from high school and is attracted to her, despite her obviously questionable motives
- Sara Rodier as Lily, the stepdaughter of one of Meredith's friends and an unpopular student at the school
- Kristin Davis as Ginny Taylor-Clapp, a self-serious and overzealous teacher who is immediately suspicious of Meredith
- David Alan Grier as Carl Gaines, the recently divorced principal of Richard Nixon Middle who takes an instant liking to Meredith

=== Recurring ===
- Caitlin Kimball as Kim Superfine, a student teacher who works with Ginny
- Stuart Allan as James Pfaff, a student
- Madison De La Garza as Kelsey, a student
- Grace Kaufman as Bronwen, a student
- Kat Foster as Brie, Meredith's friend at whose house Meredith lives after the divorce
- Brett Gelman as Doug Pilaf, the school's eccentric math teacher
- Colin Hanks as Coach Donnie, the school's other gym teacher

== Production and development ==
The show was first reported to be in development on 5 October 2012, and received a pilot order on 23 January 2013. Don Scardino became attached to direct the pilot on 13 March 2013.

On 18 February 2013, David Alan Grier was the first to join the cast in the role of Carl. On 19 February, Ari Graynor was cast in the lead role of Meredith. On 21 February, Ryan Hansen was cast as Joel. On 6 March, Sara Gilbert was cast as Irene. On 13 March, Kristin Davis was cast as Ginny. Sara Rodier was also cast in the role of Lily, though this casting news received no announcement. On 19 March 2013, Caitlin Kimball joined the cast in a recurring role, portraying Kim.

On 13 May 2013, it was reported that the series would not receive a fall 2013 commitment from CBS.

The series was absent entirely from the CBS 2013–14 schedule announced on May 15, 2013, however a series pickup was announced a week later on May 22, 2013.

The series premiered during primetime on April 24, 2014. At its 2014–15 upfront presentation on May 10, 2014, CBS announced that the series had been canceled after airing only three episodes.

After the fifth episode aired on May 22, 2014, the planned broadcasts of the sixth and seventh episodes were completely pulled from the schedule – being replaced with reruns of The Millers that had been previously scheduled to air an hour earlier.

== Episodes ==
No.	Title	Directed by	Written by	Original release date	Prod. code	US viewers (millions)
1	"Pilot"	Don Scardino	Hilary Winston	April 24, 2014	100	7.80
Meredith, a former trophy wife, receives nothing after her divorce due to having signed a prenuptual agreement to that effect. She uses a fake resume to become a teacher at an upscale middle school in hope of meeting the students' wealthy, single fathers and marrying one of them for his money. A faculty member, Ginny, becomes suspicious.
2	"Daddy Issues"	Peter Lauer	Tim McAuliffe	May 1, 2014	103	6.47
Meredith takes a liking to a wealthy father of one of her students, who will not let her date him.
3	"Evaluation Day"	Victor Nelli	Ben Dougan	May 8, 2014	106	5.73
Meredith is tasked to help Ginny during teacher-evaluation day. Meanwhile, Meredith is accused of exploiting a friendship.
4	"Fieldtrippers"	Bryan Gordon	Billy Finnegan	May 15, 2014	107	5.48
After Meredith meets a cute guy, Shawn, in a coffee shop, then learns he drives a Lamborghini and works for a successful tech company, she arranges a class trip to go see him again. Meanwhile, Ginny develops a crush on the handsome school janitor.
5	"The 6th Grade Lock-In"	Adam Davidson	Erica Rivinoja	May 22, 2014	104	4.34
After having sex in a school closet, Joel professes his feelings to Meredith, who claims they are just colleagues who sleep together at work. However, they are put together as chaperones for the Sixth-Grade Lock-In.
6	"Yearbook"	Fred Savage	Matthew Libman & Daniel Libman	July 5, 2014	110	1.52
Meredith and Ginny must complete the student yearbook within 24 hours. Ginny's recent break-up slows preparation and Meredith has to mend the broken hearted.
7	"Divorced Dudes"	Fred Goss	Hilary Winston	July 5, 2014	101	1.40
Meredith looks for her second husband in Carl's support group.
8	"Nix the Fat Week"	Eric Appel	Amy Pocha and Seth Cohen	July 12, 2014	109	1.54
Meredith asks Irene for help when a famous vegan chef visits during Health Week. Also, Carl prepares for the 50-yard dash.
9	"Life Science"	Eyal Gordin	Mat Harawitz	July 12, 2014	102	1.48
Meredith tries to fix the student science fair after placing a wager in the teacher's betting pool.
10	"Found Money"	Matt Sohn	Jamie Rhonheimer	July 19, 2014	105	1.46
After finding money in the school parking lot, Meredith uses it to pay for a ski trip, but she soon discovers it was lost by Ginny and intended for a student trip. Elsewhere, divorced Carl goes bar-hopping.
11	"A Little Respect"	Fred Goss	David McHugh and Matthew Flanagan	July 19, 2014	108	1.35
Meredith and Carl are at odds when she refuses to apologize for offending the parents of the school's best student. Meanwhile, Joel puts a scratch on Ginny's car.
12	"The Bottle"	Linda Mendoza	Jamie Rhonheimer	July 26, 2014	111	1.47
Meredith's plans to celebrate her birthday at her favorite party venue fail.
13	"What's Old Is New"	Jay Chandrasekhar	Hilary Winston	July 26, 2014	112	1.51
The school's standardized tests begin, but Meredith and Carl get distracted when their ex-spouses (Steven Weber, Niecy Nash) arrive.

== Reception ==
=== Critical response ===
The series holds a rating of 51/100 on Metacritic, indicating "mixed or average" reviews, based on the reviews of 22 critics. On another review aggregation website, Rotten Tomatoes, it was given a score of 56% with an average rating of 5.2 out of 10, based on 25 reviews. The website’s consensus reads: " Ari Graynor's comedic talents are largely wasted on Bad Teacher, which reboots the same shtick from the movie with none of the edge". Ben Travers of Indiewire gave the pilot a D. Mitch Salem of ShowBuzzDaily.com gave the verdict of "Change the Channel". Verne Gay of Newsday also gave the show a D.

=== U.S. ratings ===
No.	Episode	Original air date	Timeslot (EST)	Viewers (millions)	Rating/share (Adults 18–49)
1	"Pilot"	April 24, 2014	Thursday 9:30 pm	7.80	2.1/6
2	"Daddy Issues"	May 1, 2014	Thursday 9:30 pm	6.47	1.4/4
3	"Evaluation Day"	May 8, 2014	Thursday 9:30 pm	5.73	1.3/4
4	"Fieldtrippers"	May 15, 2014	Thursday 9:30 pm	5.48	1.4/4
5	"The 6th Grade Lock-In"	May 22, 2014	Thursday 9:30 pm	4.34	1.1/4
6	"Yearbook"	July 5, 2014	Saturday 8:00 pm	1.52	0.3/1
7	"Divorced Dudes"	July 5, 2014	Saturday 8:30 pm	1.40	0.3/1
8	"Nix the Fat Week"	July 12, 2014	Saturday 8:00 pm	1.54	0.3/1
9	"Life Science"	July 12, 2014	Saturday 8:30 pm	1.48	0.3/1
10	"Found Money"	July 19, 2014	Saturday 9:00 pm	1.46	0.3/1
11	"A Little Respect"	July 19, 2014	Saturday 9:30 pm	1.35	0.3/1
12	"The Bottle"	July 26, 2014	Saturday 9:00 pm	1.47	0.3/1
13	"What's Old Is New"	July 26, 2014	Saturday 9:30 pm	1.51	0.3/1
