= Ben Franklin (The Office) =

- The Office episode
- Andrew Daly as Benjamin Franklin talking about his kite experiment.
- Episode no.: Season 3 Episode 15
- Directed by: Randall Einhorn
- Written by: Mindy Kaling
- Cinematography by: Matt Sohn
- Editing by: Dean Holland
- Production code: 315
- Original air date: February 1, 2007
- Running time: 21 minutes

Guest appearances
- Creed Bratton as Creed Bratton; Rashida Jones as Karen Filippelli; David Koechner as Todd Packer; Andrew Daly as Gordon; Jackie Debatin as Elizabeth; Craig Robinson as Darryl Philbin; Bobby Ray Shafer as Bob Vance

Episode chronology
← Previous "The Return"	Next → "Phyllis' Wedding"
- The Office (American season 3)

"Ben Franklin" is the fifteenth episode of the third season of the American comedy television series The Office and the show's forty-third episode overall. Written by Mindy Kaling, who also acts in the show as Kelly Kapoor, and directed by Randall Einhorn, the episode first aired in the United States on February 1, 2007, on NBC. "Ben Franklin" received 5.0/13 in the ages 18–49 demographic of the Nielsen ratings, and was watched by an estimated audience of 10.1 million viewers, and the episode received mixed reviews among critics.

In the episode, the employees from the office prepare for Phyllis Lapin's (Phyllis Smith) wedding. Michael Scott (Steve Carell), acting under advice from Todd Packer (David Koechner), instructs Dwight Schrute (Rainn Wilson) to hire a stripper for the men and delegates Jim Halpert (John Krasinski) to hire one for the women. While Dwight hires a stripper, Jim ends up hiring a Ben Franklin impersonator (Andy Daly) instead.

== Synopsis ==
The office plays host to a bridal shower for Phyllis Lapin while Bob Vance's bachelor party is held in the warehouse. Though Michael Scott is aware that the company's sexual harassment policy forbids strippers in the workplace, Todd Packer convinces him that it is okay to hire a stripper for the bachelor party if he also gets a male stripper for the bridal shower. After Jim Halpert admitted to Karen Filippelli in the previous episode that he still has feelings for Pam Beesly, interactions between the three become increasingly tense.

Michael delegates the hiring of the strippers to Dwight Schrute and Jim. While Dwight locates a stripper named Elizabeth for Bob Vance's party, Jim orders an educational Benjamin Franklin impersonator as a joke. Pam and Karen have fun gently heckling the impersonator. Jim tells Dwight that the impersonator is the real Ben Franklin. Dwight says he's "99% sure" this is not so but asks questions to the impersonator that he believes only the real Ben Franklin would know, such as who was the King of Austria (Joseph II) and who was the King of Prussia (Frederick William III). The well-practiced impersonator answers each question correctly without hesitation, much to Dwight's anger and disbelief. In the break room, Karen confronts Pam about Jim and Pam's kiss and asks if she is still interested in Jim. Made nervous by the questioning, Pam uses misleading wording, babbles uncontrollably, and at the end of the conversation blurts out "I'm sorry." Karen finds her behavior baffling but not suspicious.

At the bachelor party, Bob Vance refuses a lap dance, so Michael volunteers. During the lap dance, Michael becomes concerned that this is cheating on Jan Levinson and brings the show to an abrupt close. Dwight decides to get the three hours of work they paid the stripper for by having her answer calls. After consulting with "Ben Franklin" and the stripper, Michael decides to tell Jan about the lap dance. However, Jan is less upset by his unfaithfulness to her than by his violation of company policy. Relieved, Michael makes lovey dovey talk to Jan even as she suggests firing him over the incident.

The Benjamin Franklin impersonator flirts with Pam at her desk. Jim hears about this and teasingly asks if things are getting serious. This makes Pam embarrassed by her lack of a boyfriend, and she asks Ryan Howard to set her up with one of his friends from business school.

== Production ==
"Ben Franklin" was the second episode of the series directed by Randall Einhorn. Einhorn had previously directed "Initiation", as well as the summer spin-off webisodes "The Accountants". "Ben Franklin" was written by Mindy Kaling, who acts on the show as customer service representative Kelly Kapoor. The episode was the sixth of the series written by Kaling.

Jackie Debatin, who appeared in "Ben Franklin" as Elizabeth, is used to playing strippers and hookers. Debatin had previously been a stripper on Friends, a stripper on That '70s Show, a stripper on Two and a Half Men, a madam on Veronica Mars, and a call girl on Boston Legal. In an interview, Debatin said playing Elizabeth was "probably the best experience I have had in TV work", because the cast and crew were "down to earth, fun, grateful to be there". Although actor Andrew Daly, who played Gordon the Ben Franklin impersonator, had already known John Krasinski, Angela Kinsey, B. J. Novak and Kate Flannery, he said that The Office cast and crew "could not have been more welcoming to me". Daly especially liked it when the actors "depart[ed] from the script and improvised a little". Before filming, Daly mistakenly believed the show was mostly improvised and studied the Wikipedia article on Benjamin Franklin, but his studying paid off: during filming of Dwight's interrogation of the impersonator, Rainn Wilson improvised a question about whether Benjamin Franklin was nearsighted or farsighted. Daly was immediately prepared with the response, "Both, that's why I invented the bifocals." This scene made it into the final episode.

== Reception ==
"Ben Franklin" received 5.0/13 in the ages 18–49 demographic of the Nielsen ratings. This means that five percent of all households with an 18- to 49-year-old living in it watched the episode, and 13 percent had their television tuned to the channel at any point. The episode was watched by an estimated audience of 10.1 million viewers. "Ben Franklin" is one of only a handful of other episodes of The Office to reach over 10 million viewers, the others being the show's pilot episode, "The Injury," "Traveling Salesmen," "The Return," and "Stress Relief," of which the latter reached over 20 million viewers.

"Ben Franklin" received mixed to positive reviews from critics. IGN's Brian Zoromski wrote that "The Office was in truly excellent form this week." Zoromski went on to credit the "great progression" in the Jim-Pam-Karen love triangle and Michael being "his completely inept self" as parts of the episode that made it "one of the best Office episodes this season". Michael Sciannamea of TV Squad was less enthusiastic about the episode, writing that although it was "solid", "not much happened here other than the Jim-Karen-Pam triangle." Abby West of Entertainment Weekly praised the love triangle, saying "The Pam/Karen confrontation was as uncomfortable as I could possibly hope for. It's so gratifying to see Pam's armor cracking." West also praised the work of the supporting cast.

== Notes ==
- This episode begins Andy Bernard's 4-episode absence from the office, as he has gone to anger management training. He later returns in "The Negotiation".
