= Hello Ladies =

American television series

- Title card
- Genre: Sitcom; Romantic comedy; Cringe comedy; Screwball comedy; Surreal humour; Slice of life
- Created by: Stephen Merchant; Lee Eisenberg; Gene Stupnitsky
- Starring: Stephen Merchant; Christine Woods; Nate Torrence; Kevin Weisman; Kyle Mooney
- Opening theme: "Alone Too Long" by Hall & Oates
- Composer: Vik Sharma
- Country of origin: United States
- Original language: English
- No. of seasons: 1
- No. of episodes: 9

Production
- Executive producers: Stephen Merchant; Lee Eisenberg; Gene Stupnitsky
- Camera setup: Single-camera
- Running time: 30 minutes
- Production companies: Four Eyes Entertainment; Quantity Entertainment; ABC Studios; HBO Entertainment

Original release
- Network: HBO
- Release: September 29, 2013 – November 22, 2014

Hello Ladies is an American sitcom created by Stephen Merchant, Lee Eisenberg, and Gene Stupnitsky. It stars Merchant as an Englishman looking for love in modern Los Angeles. The series premiered on the American network HBO on September 29, 2013. On January 23, 2014, HBO canceled the series; however, the series was concluded with a feature-length special, which aired on November 22, 2014.

Hello Ladies was adapted from Merchant's stand-up show of the same name. The show's title comes from the catchphrase Stuart uses at least once per episode.

== Premise ==
Stuart "Hello Ladies" Pritchard is a socially inept Englishman living in Los Angeles with the intent of finding the woman of his dreams. However, the unlucky Stuart keeps falling into situations that, more often than not, have him embarrassing himself in front of women. Stuart's support network include his best friend Wade, who is trying to cope with life as a bachelor after he and his wife separate, and Jessica, an aspiring actress-screenwriter living in his guest-house.

== Cast ==
- Stephen Merchant as Stuart Pritchard
- Christine Woods as Jessica Vanderhoff
- Nate Torrence as Wade Bailey
- Kevin Weisman as Kives
- Kyle Mooney as Rory

Guest stars included Nicole Kidman, David Hornsby, Crista Flanagan, Jenny Slate, Lindsey Broad, Carly Craig, Eddie Pepitone, Lucy Punch, Marc Evan Jackson, Wayne Federman, Sean Wing and Sarah Wright.

== Critical reception ==
On the review aggregator website Metacritic, the lone season of Hello Ladies scored 58 out of 100, indicating "mixed or average reviews".

== Episodes ==
=== Season 1 (2013) ===
No.	Title	Directed by	Written by	Original release date	Viewers (millions)
1	"Pilot"	Stephen Merchant	Stephen Merchant & Gene Stupnitsky & Lee Eisenberg	September 29, 2013	0.552
Stuart's plans to pick up his roommate Jessica's friend go awry when he finds himself out in the LA nightlife with his two friends: glum Wade, in the middle of separating from his wife, and dirty-minded ladies' man Kives, who uses a wheelchair.
2	"The Limo"	Stephen Merchant	Stephen Merchant & Gene Stupnitsky & Lee Eisenberg	October 6, 2013	0.410
When Wade's ex-wife rejects his plan to take her out in a limo, Stuart, hoping to impress ladies, hits the town in the luxury car with Wade and Kives.
3	"The Date"	Stephen Merchant	Stephen Merchant & Gene Stupnitsky & Lee Eisenberg	October 13, 2013	0.477
After Jessica points out that a woman (Lindsey Broad) at the gym's drink counter is flirting with him, Stuart asks her out but starts getting paranoid about her texts.
4	"The Dinner"	Stephen Merchant	Stephen Merchant & Gene Stupnitsky & Lee Eisenberg	October 20, 2013	N/A
Stuart goes to a gay bar to hit on women after Jessica tells him that straight women hang out there because they're less likely to be hit on.
5	"Pool Party"	Julian Farino	Stephen Merchant & Gene Stupnitsky & Lee Eisenberg	October 27, 2013	N/A
Stuart throws a pool party in the hopes of it becoming a playboy-esque bash. Meanwhile, Jessica takes in a 19-year-old homeless girl.
6	"Long Beach"	Julian Farino	Daniel Chun	November 3, 2013	N/A
Stuart tries to befriend the tough construction workers doing repairs at his house, Wade makes a romantic gesture to win back his wife, and Jessica tells Glenn she wants a real relationship--all with disastrous results.
7	"The Wedding"	Greg Daniels	Ron Weiner	November 10, 2013	N/A
Stuart and Jessica's time at a wedding begins without much promise, but soon finds great professional news for her and a promising interaction with a lovely model for him.
8	"The Drive"	Stephen Merchant	Stephen Merchant & Gene Stupnitsky & Lee Eisenberg	November 17, 2013	N/A
Wade faces a hard truth about his failing marriage. Jessica's glee over her breakthrough casting turns to sadness when she gets bad news. Stuart's quest to see Kimberley, a model, takes several surprising turns.

=== The Movie (2014) ===
Title	Directed by	Written by	Original release date	Viewers (millions)
"Hello Ladies: The Movie"	Stephen Merchant	Stephen Merchant & Gene Stupnitsky & Lee Eisenberg	November 22, 2014	N/A
After his ex-girlfriend calls to tell Stuart that she and her husband will be visiting LA, Stuart, desperate to show he's "won at life," enlists Jessica to pose as his girlfriend.

== Music ==
The opening theme music is "Alone Too Long" by Hall & Oates. Credits music for each episode differs:

=== Season 1 (2013) ===
- Episode 1: "Kiss You All Over" by Exile
- Episode 2: "Look Who's Lonely Now" by Bill LaBounty
- Episode 3: "You Belong to the City" by Glenn Frey
- Episode 4: "Year of the Cat" by Al Stewart
- Episode 5: "The Guitar Man" by Bread
- Episode 6: "Get It Right Next Time" by Gerry Rafferty
- Episode 7: "Oh Yeah" by Roxy Music
- Episode 8: "Marriage Bureau Rendezvous" by 10cc

=== Hello Ladies: The Movie (2014) ===
- "Some Like It Hot" by The Power Station, "Somebody" by Bryan Adams, "Sussudio" by Phil Collins, "Days Gone Down" by Gerry Rafferty

== Reception ==
=== Series ===
On the review aggregator website Rotten Tomatoes, 52% of 25 critics' reviews for the first season are positive. The website's consensus reads: "Stephen Merchant is an intelligent performer, but Hello Ladies is largely a squirm-inducing comedy that lacks the empathy of his best work." Metacritic, which uses a weighted average, assigned the season a score of 58 out of 100, based on 21 critics, indicating "mixed or average" reviews.

=== Movie ===
On the review aggregator website Rotten Tomatoes, 71% of seven critics' reviews are positive.

== Home media ==
"Hello Ladies: The Complete Series and the Movie" was released on DVD on May 26, 2015, which includes deleted scenes and making-of featurette. The complete collection is available in HD via iTunes and Amazon Prime Video, though no Blu-ray release has been announced. The series also are available on HBO Max in United States, Latin America and Europe.
