= The Chump =

- The Office episode
- Episode no.: Season 6 Episode 25
- Directed by: Randall Einhorn
- Written by: Aaron Shure
- Cinematography by: Matt Sohn
- Editing by: Michael Zurer
- Production code: 625
- Original air date: May 13, 2010

Guest appearances
- Amy Pietz as Donna Newton; Zach Woods as Gabe Lewis

Episode chronology
← Previous "The Cover-Up"	Next → "Whistleblower"
- The Office (American season 6)

"The Chump" is the twenty-fifth and penultimate episode of the sixth season of the American comedy series The Office and the show's 125th episode overall. It originally aired on May 13, 2010 on NBC in the United States.

In the episode, Michael is surprisingly cheerful after learning his girlfriend is married. The new parents, Pam and Jim, have trouble staying awake in the office. Meanwhile, Angela takes matters into her own hands when Dwight refuses to honor their prenatal contract.

It was written by Aaron Shure and was directed by Randall Einhorn. The episode has received mixed reviews from critics and was viewed by 6.604 million viewers.

== Plot ==
The entire office braces for the fallout of Michael Scott learning about his girlfriend Donna's infidelity, but surprisingly, Michael is as cheerful as usual. The office deduces that Michael is secretly still seeing Donna. When they confront him about this, Michael becomes defensive and refuses to cut off the adulterous relationship. Andy Bernard, having been in the situation of the cuckold when Angela was cheating on him with Dwight, decides to step up and make Michael confront his girlfriend's husband. They both go visit him while he is coaching a high school baseball team, and Andy gets the two of them to talk.

Dwight Schrute and Angela Martin are working out the baby contract they signed a few months earlier. Instead of going to court, they have asked a mediator to sort out the issues. After pushing through the contract line for line, which include several bizarre clauses such as one that stipulates "whether this is all part of the Matrix", the mediator determines that the contract is solid but unenforceable. Instead, Angela could sue Dwight for damages up to $30,000 for breach of contract. Knowing that Dwight could never pay her damages, she offers him a "settlement": five separate sessions of intercourse. He accepts. Later, Dwight carries out various methods to try to sterilize himself before the first "session", such as holding his crotch near a running microwave, dropping books on it, and aggressively beating it with drumsticks.

Pam Halpert and Jim Halpert are both exhausted from the long nights with the new baby, and their work is being adversely affected. Gabe Lewis catches them both sleeping at their desks and talks to them privately about it. He asks them what they would do about the rumors of printers catching fire, but they both nearly fall asleep listening to him. Darryl Philbin hears them discussing how to get enough energy to make it through the day, and lets them in on a secret sleeping place in the warehouse they can use. Unfortunately for them, this secret location is within earshot of Dwight and Angela's "warehouse meeting" place, where Angela complains about the damage to Dwight's testicles while Dwight gripes about having to perform foreplay.

After returning from the baseball game, Michael expresses a sense of freedom and power from the knowledge that he is having sex with another man's wife. Ryan Howard tries the same attitude and petitions Erin Hannon for sex, but cannot hold through and says he was just joking. He explains to Michael that to do what he is doing, one has to be completely cold and uncaring of what other people think, and that he does not know how Michael can do it. The rest of the office increasingly shuns Michael. He leaves to secretly meet Donna at a motel for sex, but on the way there has a change of heart and breaks up with her via text message instead. He consoles himself, alone, with his favorite ice cream, and tells the camera crew that he chose being able to live with himself over being happy.

At the end of the episode, Michael is ambushed by WBRE-TV reporters, to whom he begins to confess the adulterous rumors to, before they clarify that they were inquiring about the rumors of Sabre printers catching fire.

== Production ==
The episode was written by Aaron Shure, his second writing credit of the season after "The Meeting." It was directed by Randall Einhorn, his fourth episode of the season and twelfth in the series overall. After the episode aired NBC posted three deleted scenes on its website.

== Cultural references ==
When Michael is confronted from his employees about continuing his relationship with Donna even after he knows she's married, he declares a "moment of silence" in honor of Michael Jackson to shut them up. Creed says his favorite movie starring James McAvoy was Wanted. When Andy and Michael have a conversation of Michael's affair they reference the 2009 film, Obsessed (which was about an affair) with Andy referring to himself as Beyoncé and Michael as Ali Larter. Michael calls Stanley, "Morgan Freeman, narrating everything." When Michael asserts that he is going to eat anything he wants, when he wants, Kevin replies, "That's a dangerous game, Friendo," probably alluding to the movie No Country for Old Men.

The characters on the show make reference to a fictional video game title, Rock Band: Billy Joel, to which Darren Franich of Entertainment Weekly said "let’s hope never actually exists ever". Billy Joel, in response, sought to authorize the use of his songs with the actual Rock Band series as a means to snub Franich's comment.

== Reception ==
In its original American broadcast, "The Chump" was viewed by 6.60 million viewers with a 3.4 rating/10% share in the 18–49 demographic going down 3% from "The Cover-Up". The episode came second in its timeslot after Grey's Anatomy. The episode ranked 17th in the weekly 18–49 ratings.

Cindy White of IGN gave the episode a 7.5 saying it was "Good" and "The show is at its best when it mixes the business aspects of the office setting with the character's personal lives. Too much focus on one or the other can be a drag, and this episode suffered a bit for it." Joel Keller of TV Squad said that Michael's character was too inconsistent throughout the episode. Nathan Rabin of The A.V. Club gave the episode a B+ and wrote that the episode was too unrealistic like previous episodes. Rabin said Michael was too much of a jerk although he noted that "if the episode came up short in the likability and realism department it was nevertheless funny and full of great little character moments, like the dreamy, faraway look Darryl gets while describing the warehouse employee’s secret napping spot or Ryan’s response to Michael's new gung-ho, take-charge personality." Alan Sepinwall gave the episode a negative review, stating that the opening scene (where Michael was his usual nasty self towards Toby Flenderson and the rest of the office mostly supported Michael behaving that way) was not plausible, Michael's behavior as a cuckold was not enjoyable, and the Angela-Dwight "procreation contract" story was ridiculous.

Darren Franich of Entertainment Weekly loved the fact that Pam Beesly had been featured more on the show. He remarked on the ending that "Coming at the end of a mostly light episode, that was a heavy line. Nice payoff, Office." Neil Turitz of TV Guide remarked "One of the funnier episodes of late, especially the montage of Dwight continually causing himself great pain in the crotch area. Low humor, perhaps, but still funny." Will Leitch of New York magazine said "All in all, this penultimate episode took care of Michael, Dwight, and every other lingering thread from a meandering season except for the big one, in a very funny last-scene reveal."
