= Year One (film) =

2009 American adventure comedy film

- Theatrical release poster
- Directed by: Harold Ramis
- Screenplay by: Harold Ramis; Gene Stupnitsky; Lee Eisenberg
- Story by: Harold Ramis
- Produced by: Harold Ramis; Judd Apatow; Clayton Townsend
- Starring: Jack Black; Michael Cera; Oliver Platt; David Cross; Hank Azaria
- Cinematography: Alar Kivilo
- Edited by: Craig Herring; Steve Welch
- Music by: Theodore Shapiro
- Production companies: Columbia Pictures; The Apatow Company; Ocean Pictures
- Distributed by: Sony Pictures Releasing
- Release date: June 19, 2009 (North America)
- Running time: 97 minutes
- Country: United States
- Language: English
- Budget: $60 million
- Box office: $62.4 million

Year One is a 2009 American adventure comedy film directed by Harold Ramis, produced by Ramis, Judd Apatow, and Clayton Townsend, written by Ramis, Gene Stupnitsky, and Lee Eisenberg, and stars Jack Black, and Michael Cera in lead roles, alongside an ensemble supporting cast including Oliver Platt, David Cross, Christopher Mintz-Plasse, Vinnie Jones, Juno Temple, June Diane Raphael, Olivia Wilde, Bill Hader, and Hank Azaria. A parody on the book of Genesis, the plot follows two Stone Age tribesmen who travel to the Bronze Age city of Sodom to save their love interests after being banished from their tribe. Problems quickly emerge during their journey, as they encounter several biblical figures along the way.

The film was produced by Apatow's production company The Apatow Company and was released on June 19, 2009, by Columbia Pictures. It grossed $19.6 million in its opening weekend and $62.4 million worldwide, against a budget of $60 million. Upon release, Year One was panned by critics and audiences, receiving only a 14% approval rating based on 173 votes on Rotten Tomatoes. This was the last film to involve Ramis before his death in 2014.

== Plot ==
Zed is a disillusioned hunter in a primitive Stone Age tribe, who yearns for a purpose. When the tribe learn he has eaten from the Tree of Knowledge, hunter Marlak and the shaman banish him. Oh, a timid gatherer, reluctantly joins Zed on a journey to discover what the world has to offer, after Zed accidentally burns down the village.

The duo encounter Cain and Abel in the Copper Age. Cain kills Abel with a boulder in an act of rage and tells Zed and Oh that they must escape with him or else they will be accused of killing Abel.

Zed and Oh find out their love interests, Maya and Eema, from their tribe have been captured and sold into slavery. Trying to buy the girls' freedom, they end up being sold as slaves themselves, as Cain had been wanting to rid himself of the murder's witnesses. Whilst in transport, the slave caravan containing Oh, Zed, Maya, Eema and others from their tribe is attacked and overpowered by Sodomites. Zed and Oh escape and hide in the desert but lose track of the now Sodomite-led slave caravan.

Still resolved to free the slaves and knowing the caravan's new destination, Zed and Oh pass by a mountain where they find Abraham about to kill his son Isaac. Zed stops them, telling Abraham that God sent him to do so. He takes them to his Hebrew village and tells them about the Bronze Age cities of Sodom and Gomorrah.

Zed and Oh head off for Sodom when Abraham plans to circumcise them. As they arrive, they are captured. Cain, now a Sodomite soldier, saves them from being sodomized, calling them his "brothers". They remind Cain he sold them as slaves; he apologizes and offers them food, gives Zed and Oh a tour of the city, and gets them jobs as guards. While patrolling the city they see the Sumerian princess Inanna, who is fasting as she feels guilty that most of the city is starving. She notices Zed and has him invited to a party that night, surreptitiously pulling him aside for clandestine discussion.

Inside the palace, Zed sees Maya and Eema serving as slaves, but Oh is forced to follow the High Priest around the palace while Zed meets with Princess Inanna, who asks him to enter the Holy of Holies and tell her what it is like, believing Zed is the "Chosen One".

Inside the temple, Zed encounters Oh, who is hiding from the high priest. They get into a heated argument and are ratted on by an eavesdropping Cain, who then imprisons them for entering the temple. Sentenced to be stoned to death, Zed convinces the Sodomites to have mercy, so they are instead sentenced to hard labor until they die from work.

The king then announces that he will sacrifice his daughter and two virgins (Maya and Eema), who were labeled by Cain as "followers of the Chosen One", as a gift to the gods. The growing crowd, already at its breaking point from the famine, reacts negatively as Princess Inanna is already very popular for her regular displays of solidarity with the people.

Zed interrupts the ceremony, and Oh instigates a riot with the exclamation "The Chosen One Comes!". Abraham arrives with the Hebrews to help overthrow the King. Oh and Eema have sex inside the palace, meaning that Eema cannot be sacrificed. They help Zed subdue the other soldiers, who have already turned on and killed the King.

Zed and Oh stop the High Priest from sacrificing Maya. The crowd is ready to proclaim Zed as the Leader being the "Chosen One" but he decides that his love for Oh, Eema, and Maya outstrips his wish to be a Savior persona. He lets Inanna rule, and becomes an explorer with Maya. Oh becomes the leader of his home village. The two say goodbye and head their separate ways.

== Cast ==
- Jack Black as Zed
- Michael Cera as Oh
- Oliver Platt as High Priest
- David Cross as Cain
- Christopher Mintz-Plasse as Isaac
- Vinnie Jones as Sargon
- Hank Azaria as Abraham
- Juno Temple as Eema, Sister of Zed
- Olivia Wilde as Princess Inanna
- June Diane Raphael as Maya
- Xander Berkeley as The King
- Gia Carides as The Queen
- Eden Riegel as Lilith
- Horatio Sanz as Enmebaragesi
- David Pasquesi as Prime Minister
- Matthew J. Willig as Marlak
- Bill Hader as The Shaman

The film's director, Harold Ramis, Rhoda Griffis, Gabriel Sunday and an uncredited Paul Rudd complete the family unit of Adam, Eve, Seth and Abel, respectively.

== Music ==
The score to Year One was composed by Theodore Shapiro, who recorded his score with contemporary band elements, and a 75-piece ensemble of the Hollywood Studio Symphony at the Sony Scoring Stage.

== Marketing ==
A commercial for the film aired during Super Bowl XLIII; soon after, a clip from the film surfaced on YouTube, and the first trailer was attached to I Love You, Man.

They sponsored an episode of the Fred Figglehorn web series.

== Reception ==
=== Critical response ===
On Rotten Tomatoes, the film has an approval rating of 14% based on 173 reviews, with an average rating of 3.90/10. The site's consensus reads, "Year One is a poorly executed, slapdash comedy in which the talent both in front of and behind the camera never seem to be on the same page." On Metacritic, the film has a weighted average score of 34% based on 28 reviews. Audiences surveyed by CinemaScore gave the film a grade B− on scale of A to F.

Michael Phillips of the Chicago Tribune gave the film a "fair-good" review of 2.5 out of 4 stars, stating, "Year One won't join [Ramis's] list of essential comedies, the ones [he] helped create as writer, director, performer or combination thereof." Claudia Puig of USA Today gave the film 2 out of 4 stars complaining that the film "is scattershot and silly, squandering its potential by relying on juvenile bawdy humor". Roger Ebert of the Chicago Sun-Times gave the film 1 star out of 4, stating that the film "is a dreary experience, and all the ending accomplishes is to bring it to a close".

=== Box office ===
Year One opened at #4 at the US box office in its opening weekend. The film eventually grossed $43,337,279 in US ticket sales, and a further $19,020,621 worldwide, for a total of $62,357,900. Its production budget was $60 million.
