= Bad Teacher =

2011 film by Jake Kasdan

- Theatrical release poster
- Directed by: Jake Kasdan
- Written by: Lee Eisenberg; Gene Stupnitsky
- Produced by: Jimmy Miller; David Householter
- Starring: Cameron Diaz; Justin Timberlake; Lucy Punch; John Michael Higgins; Jason Segel
- Cinematography: Alar Kivilo
- Edited by: Tara Timpone
- Music by: Michael Andrews
- Production companies: Columbia Pictures; Mosaic Media Group
- Distributed by: Sony Pictures Releasing
- Release date: June 24, 2011
- Running time: 92 minutes
- Country: United States
- Language: English
- Budget: $20 million
- Box office: $216 million

Bad Teacher is a 2011 American comedy film directed by Jake Kasdan and written by the writing team of Lee Eisenberg and Gene Stupnitsky. Starring Cameron Diaz, Justin Timberlake, Lucy Punch, John Michael Higgins, and Jason Segel, the film tells the story of a middle school teacher who hates her job, her students, and her co-workers, but returns to teaching after her wealthy fiancé breaks up with her.

Bad Teacher was released in the United States on June 24, 2011, by Columbia Pictures. It received mixed reviews from critics and grossed $216 million.

== Plot ==
Elizabeth Halsey is a lazy and immoral teacher at John Adams Middle School in Chicago. She curses at her students, drinks heavily, smokes marijuana, and lets her students watch movies so she can sleep through class. She plans to quit teaching and marry her wealthy fiancé Mark, but he dumps her when his mother shows him that Elizabeth is only after his money, so she resumes her job.

Elizabeth tries to win over wealthy substitute teacher Scott Delacorte, rejecting advances from gym teacher Russell Gettis. Her dedicated and enthusiastic colleague Amy Squirrel also pursues Scott.

Discovering that Scott's ex-girlfriend had large breasts, Elizabeth plans to get breast implants. To afford the $9,300 procedure, she participates in the school's 7th-grade car wash wearing provocative clothing and manipulates parents into giving her money for school supplies and tutoring. Amy informs the principal about Elizabeth's embezzlement, but he dismisses the claims when no evidence is provided.

Learning that the teacher of the class with the highest state test scores will receive a $5,700 bonus, Elizabeth forces the class to intensely study To Kill a Mockingbird for the test. However, the students score low on the practice quizzes, frustrating her. Scott admits that he is attracted to Amy and only likes Elizabeth as a friend. As Amy and Scott start dating, Elizabeth befriends Russell.

To steal the state test answers, Elizabeth impersonates a journalist and seduces Carl Halabi, a state professor in charge of creating and distributing the exams. She convinces Carl to go into his office to have sex, then drugs him and steals the answers. A month later, Elizabeth wins the bonus and books her breast enlargement.

Learning that Amy and Scott are chaperoning a field trip, Elizabeth smears an apple with poison ivy and leaves it for Amy, causing her to get blisters on her face. Substituting for Amy on the trip, Elizabeth seduces Scott. They dry hump, and Elizabeth leaves Amy a message through Scott's phone, recording the action. However, Scott's ever-changing ideals disappoint Elizabeth, and she loses interest in him.

Back at the school, Amy tricks the janitor into unlocking Elizabeth's desk drawer and finds clues suggesting that Elizabeth cheated on the state exam. Amy informs the principal and gets Carl to testify against her. However, Elizabeth blackmails Carl to say she is innocent.

Learning that Amy switched desks with her, Elizabeth states that teachers in the school use drugs. When the police bring a sniffer dog to search, they find Elizabeth's liquor bottles, marijuana, and OxyContin pills in Amy's classroom, in Elizabeth's desk, leading to Amy getting arrested and transferred to another school. Scott asks Elizabeth to start over, but she rejects him in favor of Russell, having learned that they have a lot in common.

When the new school year starts, Elizabeth has reformed. She is kinder to her co-workers, has started a relationship with Russell, and did not get her breasts enlarged because she feels that it is unnecessary. Elizabeth also has a new position as the guidance counselor.

== Cast ==
- Cameron Diaz as Elizabeth Halsey
- Justin Timberlake as Scott Delacorte
- Lucy Punch as Amy Squirrel
- Jason Segel as Russell Gettis
- Phyllis Smith as Lynn Davies
- John Michael Higgins as Principal Wally Snur
- Dave Allen as Sandy Pinkus
- Jillian Armenante as Ms. Pavicic
- Matthew J. Evans as Garrett Tiara
- Kaitlyn Dever as Sasha Abernathy
- Kathryn Newton as Chase Rubin-Rossi
- Molly Shannon as Melody
- Eric Stonestreet as Kirk
- Noah Munck as Tristan
- Finneas O'Connell as Spencer
- Thomas Lennon as Carl Halabi
- Jeff Judah as a janitor
- Nat Faxon as Mark Pubich
- Stephanie Faracy as Mrs. Pubich
- Christine Smith as Danni
- Paul Feig as dad at carwash
- Deirdre Lovejoy as Sasha's Mother
- Jerry Lambert as Morgan's Dad

== Production ==
Bad Teacher was directed by Jake Kasdan based on a screenplay by Lee Eisenberg and Gene Stupnitsky. Columbia Pictures purchased Eisenberg and Stupnitsky's spec script in August 2008. In May 2009, Kasdan was hired to direct Bad Teacher. The following December, Cameron Diaz was cast in the film's lead role. Justin Timberlake was cast opposite Diaz in March 2010, and filming began later in the month.

The film was shot in Los Angeles, California. John Burroughs Middle School was used as location for the scenes at "John Adams Middle School" in the film.

In the film, Cameron Diaz wears mostly Christian Louboutin shoes. This is due to a contract between the film's producers and the fashion company to include the shoes.

== Release ==
=== Box office ===
The film grossed $100 million in the U.S. and Canada, while its worldwide total stands at $216 million.

The film was released in North America on June 20, 2011, in 3,049 theaters. It took in $12,243,987—$4,016 per theater—in its opening day, and grossed a total of $31,603,106 in its opening weekend, finishing second at the box office, behind Cars 2. In Germany, the film reached No. 1 on the country's Cinema Charts in its opening week after 496,000 people saw the film. This caused Kung Fu Panda 2, which reached No. 1 the week before, to fall to No. 2.

=== Critical response ===
On the review aggregator website Rotten Tomatoes, 45% of 193 critics' reviews are positive, with an average rating of 5.3/10. The website's consensus reads: "In spite of a promising concept and a charmingly brazen performance from Cameron Diaz, Bad Teacher is never as funny as it should be." Metacritic, which uses a weighted average, assigned the film a score of 47 out of 100, based on 38 critics, indicating "mixed or average" reviews. Audiences polled by CinemaScore gave the film an average grade of "C+" on an A+ to F scale. Roger Ebert gave the film 2 stars writing "there is no chemistry, or indeed even much mutual awareness between Diaz and Timberlake."

Manohla Dargis of The New York Times called the film a "breezily crude comedy" and wrote that Diaz "taps into her inner thug", while praising the supporting performances of Lucy Punch and Phyllis Smith. Betsy Sharkey of the Los Angeles Times called Bad Teacher a "classic underachiever" and wrote that it felt "more like a string of comic vignettes than an actual story unfolding".

Common Sense Media described the film as an underwhelming raunchy comedy with unlikeable characters and little wit or insight.

=== Accolades ===
Bad Teacher garnered awards for Choice Movie – Comedy, Choice Movie Actor – Comedy (Timberlake), and Choice Movie Actress – Comedy (Diaz) at the 2011 Teen Choice Awards. Musician Michael Andrews was among the Film Music Awards honorees at the 2012 BMI Film & TV Awards. The film was nominated for Favorite Comedy Movie at the 38th People's Choice Awards. Bad Teacher received a nomination for Best Comedy at the 2011 Golden Trailer Awards. Diaz was nominated for Favorite Movie Actress – Comedy/Musical at the 12th ALMA Awards.

=== Home media ===
Bad Teacher was released on DVD, Blu-ray, and a combo pack on October 18, 2011.

== Television series ==
On May 23, 2013, CBS announced a TV series based on the film, with CBS Studios and Sony Pictures Television as production partners. The show premiered on April 24, 2014, in the 9:30pm time slot. Ari Graynor played the Cameron Diaz role, while Sara Gilbert, Ryan Hansen, David Alan Grier, Kristin Davis and Sara Rodier also appeared. On May 10, 2014, CBS canceled Bad Teacher after airing only three episodes.
