= The Negotiation (The Office) =

- The Office episode
- Episode no.: Season 3 Episode 19
- Directed by: Jeffrey Blitz
- Written by: Michael Schur
- Cinematography by: Randall Einhorn
- Editing by: Dean Holland
- Production code: 319
- Original air date: April 5, 2007
- Running time: 29 minutes

Guest appearances
- Creed Bratton as Creed Bratton; Craig Robinson as Darryl Philbin; Rashida Jones as Karen Filippelli

Episode chronology
← Previous "Cocktails"	Next → "Safety Training"
- The Office (American season 3)

"The Negotiation" (originally titled "Labor Negotiation") is the nineteenth episode of the third season of the American comedy television series The Office and the show's forty-seventh episode overall. The series depicts the everyday lives of office employees in the Scranton branch of the fictional Dunder Mifflin Paper Company. In this episode, Roy Anderson (David Denman) tries to attack Jim Halpert (John Krasinski) for kissing Pam Beesly (Jenna Fischer) in "Casino Night", only to be pepper-sprayed by Dwight Schrute (Rainn Wilson). Jim repeatedly tries to thank Dwight for his actions, but each attempt is rejected. Meanwhile, with Roy fired, Darryl Philbin (Craig Robinson) asks for a raise and is astounded when he learns that this raise would cause him to be paid more than his boss, Michael Scott (Steve Carell).

"The Negotiation" first aired on April 5, 2007 on NBC as a longer, "super-sized" episode. It was written by Michael Schur and directed by Jeffrey Blitz, and featured the end of Roy's plot arc to win back Pam, his former fiancée. This also marked the end of Denman's recurring tenure on the show, though he made guest appearances in subsequent seasons. The episode also included the return of actor Ed Helms, who portrays Andy Bernard. The episode was first screened at Paleyfest in early 2007. According to Nielsen Media Research, it was viewed by an estimated audience of 6.7 million people and earned a 3.2/10 ratings share among adults between the ages of 18 and 49. The episode received generally positive reviews, with television critics in particular praising the Dwight–Angela storyline. Schur received a Primetime Emmy Award nomination for Outstanding Writing for a Comedy Series, but lost to fellow Office writer Greg Daniels for his work on "Gay Witch Hunt".

== Synopsis ==
Roy Anderson enters the office and attacks Jim Halpert for kissing Pam Beesly, but Dwight Schrute subdues him with pepper spray. The pepper spray fumes also incidentally affect himself and others. Toby Flenderson and Michael Scott fire Roy, and a grateful Jim tries to show his appreciation to Dwight for saving him, but Dwight brusquely declines each gesture, stating he only acted in the line of duty. Pam apologizes to Jim and assures him that her relationship with Roy is over for good, though Jim is still shaken by the attack.

Darryl Philbin asks Michael for a 10 percent raise due to the extra workload resulting from Roy's termination. When this is refused because it would make his pay exceed Michael's, Darryl goads him into going to corporate to negotiate his own raise. Roy picks up his last paycheck, apologizes to Jim for threatening him, and asks Pam to join him for coffee. Their meeting at a local diner is awkward as Roy asks if Pam will pursue her feelings for Jim; she says she will not, and Roy says he does not understand Pam.

Michael goes to corporate with Toby to negotiate a raise from Jan Levinson; while she tries to keep their romantic relationship out of the negotiations, she ultimately gives Michael the maximum 12 percent raise, despite his continued inability to negotiate properly.

Throughout the day, Angela Martin asks people from the office to tell her the tale of Dwight's heroics, which arouses her. Believing themselves to be alone at the end of the day, the two kiss passionately. Jim sees them and decides that keeping their relationship secret will be his gift to Dwight to make things "even".

At the end of the episode, a rehabilitated Andy Bernard returns from anger management, but Dwight, believing him to still be a threat, subdues him with pepper spray as soon as he enters the office. This prompts Toby to confiscate the rest of Dwight's arsenal, which includes nunchucks and throwing stars.

== Production ==
"The Negotiation" was written by supervising producer Michael Schur and directed by Jeffrey Blitz. It concluded a story arc featuring Roy Anderson's attempt to win back Pam, his former fiancée. Roy's portrayer, David Denman, reported he was "really grateful" that executive producer Greg Daniels allowed his character to develop, "where all of a sudden, he wasn't just a complete idiot but felt bad for being a bad boyfriend and wanted to try to get the girl back. It's so rare to have that on a television show, because so often everyone wants you to be the same character every week. It was quite refreshing creatively to get to do that." Denman felt it was "inevitable" that love triangles on any TV series are resolved, or "it gets kind of tiring and old. I think it was the appropriate time [to leave], and I had such a great experience working with all those guys." Denman added that Daniels told him the decision stemmed from a desire to advance the Jim–Pam storyline, rather than having anything to do specifically with Denman himself. Denman briefly returned in the series' fifth, seventh, and ninth seasons.

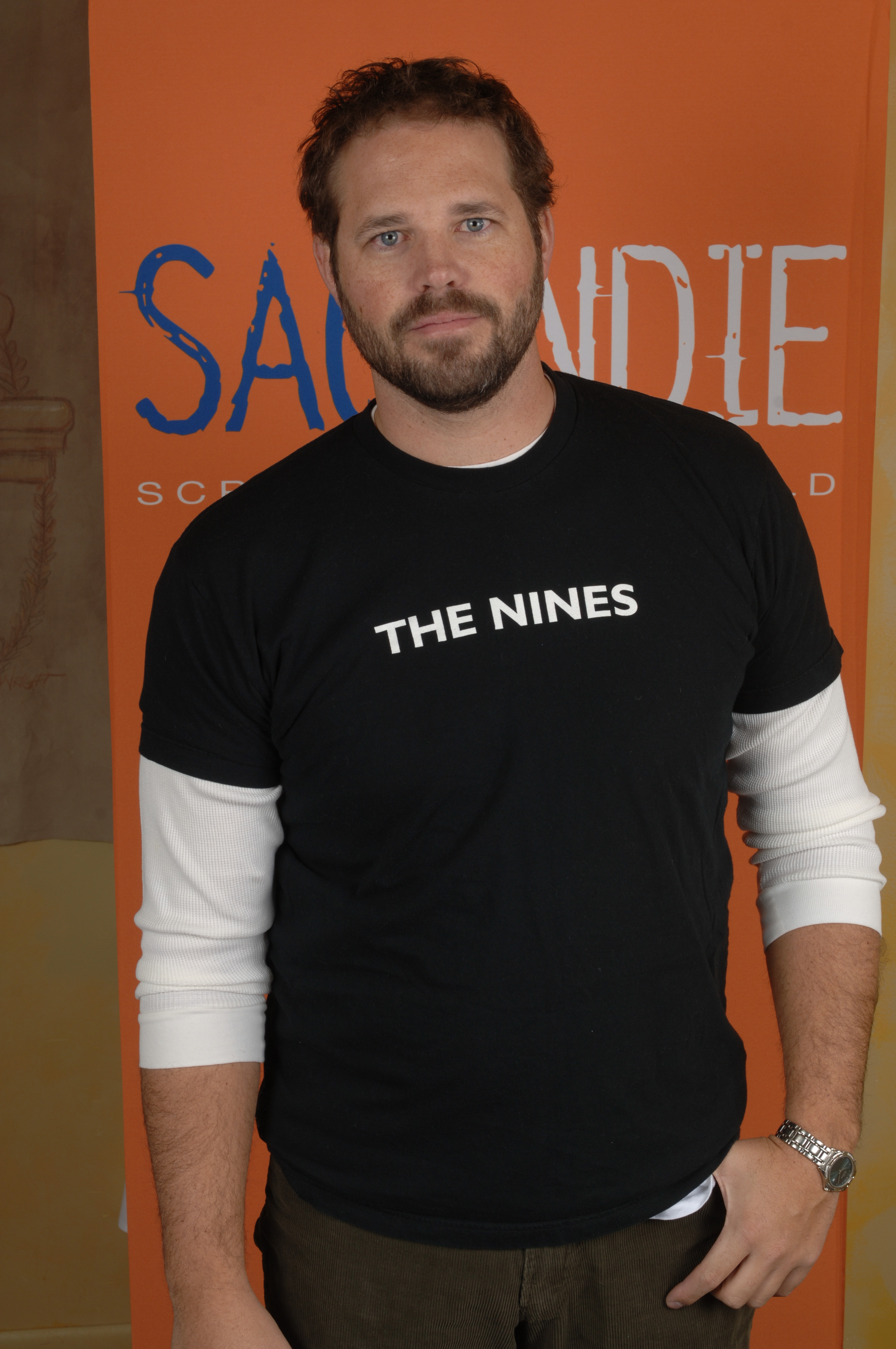
"The Negotiation" featured the last regular appearance of David Denman, who played Pam's former fiancé Roy.

Actress Kate Flannery, who plays Meredith Palmer, attributed her love of the episode to Craig Robinson, because the two shared an enjoyment of singing together ever since the first season episode "Basketball". She explained, "We sing on the set and in the hair and makeup trailer. We sound good together, but sometimes people are not in the mood to hear our amazing duets, mostly from the '80s." Flannery believed that Robinson's performance in the episode was "very funny," as his character served as a "great foil for Michael Scott." "The Negotiation" featured the return of character Andy Bernard, who had last been seen in the episode "The Return", as he was attending anger management classes. At the time "The Return" aired, no one was certain Helms would be returning, but in early February, NBC confirmed Helms had been hired on as a series regular for the rest of the year.

In early 2007, the first half of "The Negotiation" was screened before fans at Paleyfest, along with its preceding episode, "Cocktails". According to Eric Goldman of IGN, "the crowd reacted gleefully to watching the series in the group setting... laughing uproariously at the never ending stream of terrifically funny material." Part of "The Negotiation" involved Michael Scott reading the English Wikipedia entry on negotiations for advice in his attempt to fend off Darryl's request for a pay raise. This scene triggered a plethora of activity around that particular article, as viewers added their own thoughts on the subject. It was ultimately placed into "semi-protection" mode by English Wikipedia administrators to discourage false information and vandalism among anonymous IP users. One hundred edits were added before the security protection was added.

== Reception ==
"The Negotiation" first aired on April 5, 2007 in the United States on NBC as a "super-sized" episode, a term used by the network and media outlets to indicate an unusually long episode. According to Nielsen Media Research, it was viewed by an estimated 6.7 million people and earned a 3.2/10 ratings share among adults aged 18 to 49, the highest of the night. This means that it was seen by 3.2 percent of all 18- to 49-year-olds, and 10 percent of all 18- to 49-year-olds watching television at the time of the broadcast.

The episode received generally positive reviews from television critics. IGN's Brian Zoromski rated "The Negotiation" 9.7 out of 10, an indication of an "amazing" episode. He opined that it "had something for everyone – uncomfortable moments, laugh-out-loud ridiculous situations, and scenes progressing various ongoing storylines." Writing for AOL TV, Jay Black sympathized with Roy's actions but faulted the writers for "just treading water" with the Jim-Pam relationship. Though he called the episode a "let down", Black did find some episode highlights, such as Angela's "lusty" responses to Dwight's defense of Jim. Television Without Pity graded the episode with an A.

In her review for Give Me My Remote, Kath Skerry wrote that the episode "left me satisfied and smiling," (a reference to a line from the episode "Sexual Harassment") partly attributing this to Roy's attack as a "way to make a very heavy, not [so] funny moment hysterical." She again expressed her dislike for Karen, but thought it "was a fun episode for my two favorite Dunder Mifflin couples: Ryan & Kelly and Dwight & Angela." Entertainment Weekly columnist Abby West enjoyed the Dwight-Angela scenes, asserting that "some of the best moments on screen are when those two let their freak flags fly." For his work on this episode, Michael Schur received a Primetime Emmy Award nomination for Outstanding Writing for a Comedy Series, but lost to Greg Daniels for his work on "Gay Witch Hunt".
