= The Lover (The Office) =

- The Office episode
- Episode no.: Season 6 Episode 7
- Directed by: Lee Eisenberg
- Written by: Lee Eisenberg; Gene Stupnitsky
- Cinematography by: Randall Einhorn
- Editing by: Gary Levy
- Production code: 607
- Original air date: October 22, 2009

Episode chronology
← Previous "Mafia"	Next → "Koi Pond"
- The Office (American season 6)

"The Lover" is the seventh episode of the sixth season of the American comedy series The Office and the show's 107th episode overall. It was written by Lee Eisenberg and Gene Stupnitsky and directed by Eisenberg. It originally aired on October 22, 2009 on NBC.

In this episode, Jim and Pam return from their honeymoon and discover that Michael is dating Pam's mother, which infuriates her. Meanwhile, Dwight tries to install a recording device in Jim's office, by giving him a wooden mallard as an apology for their long rivalry.

== Plot ==
Jim Halpert and Pam Beesly return from their honeymoon in Puerto Rico and Michael Scott tells Jim that he has been dating Pam's mother, Helene, after spending the night with her at their wedding in Niagara. Jim is shocked and tells Michael not to mention anything to Pam (which he reluctantly agrees to do) and to break it off with Helene immediately (which he does not agree to). However, when Jim and Pam give Michael a gift from Puerto Rico, Michael asks if Pam thinks he should date who he wants. He then lets it slip he is dating Helene, and Pam storms out of the office and into the parking lot, screaming all the way down. She calls her mother and angrily asks her why she started dating him after Pam continuously complained to her mother about Michael's behavior over the past several years.

During a conference room meeting, Pam maintains a hostile attitude toward Michael and openly defies him in response to the news. Michael then gets a call from Helene, who wants him to tell Pam to calm down. Pam then announces that he has been dating Helene to the rest of the office. Everyone is initially disgusted by this, but Michael appeals to them with his human need for companionship, and they agree that Pam is overreacting. In response, Pam becomes hostile towards the rest of the office. Michael complains to Toby Flenderson about Pam's behavior, but when Toby tries to coax Pam into discussing the issue, she becomes angry with Toby as well. Pam brings Michael into the kitchen and orders him to stop dating Helene, and Michael responds by saying he will "start dating her even harder." At the end of the day, Michael feels bad and says goodnight to Pam, without response.

Dwight Schrute apologizes to Jim for their feuds, and offers him a token of his desire for peace with a wooden mallard, actually a concealed recording device which he means to use to gather damaging information about Jim. Jim quickly finds the device and starts using it to prank Dwight. He brings Andy Bernard into his office and plays "M'Appari" from the opera Martha loudly while he talks to Andy so Dwight will not hear their conversation, while using gestures to make it clear that they are discussing Dwight. He then gives the mallard to Ryan Howard and Kelly Kapoor in the annex, meaning Dwight can hear the couple's bickering, and is forced to pay $10 to get it back. Jim finally summons Dwight to his office and tells him he knew about the recording device all along. Dwight admits to being jealous of Jim's promotion. Jim tells Dwight to wash his car as punishment, which Dwight agrees is fair. Jim then brings Pam into the conference room and cheers her up by saying Dwight is washing their car out of sympathy for what she has been through and recounting stories from their honeymoon.

At the end of the episode, Dwight reveals that that recording device underneath the mallard was a decoy, and his primary recording device was installed on the tip of a pen that he claimed Jim left on his desk earlier, along with the mallard. Dwight explains he would never put his primary listening device in such an obvious place, as he is "not insane." Dwight then listens to the recordings, saying "I've got 8 hours of this", but it's Jim actually doing productive work and business.

== Reception ==
This episode was watched by 8.5 million viewers, with a 4.2 rating and an 11 share in the 18–49 demographic.
