= Lee Eisenberg =

American television writer

Lee Eisenberg is an American film and television writer and producer. He usually works with Gene Stupnitsky, with whom he founded Quantity Entertainment.

== Life and career ==
Eisenberg was born in Needham, Massachusetts. His father is an immigrant from Israel. He graduated from Connecticut College in 1999, after which he wrote the independent short film Flush, and was once a contestant on the game show Pyramid.

=== Television ===
In 2005, Eisenberg and Stupnitsky joined the staff of the NBC comedy series The Office, where they remained from seasons 2 to 6. In addition to writing, he served as a co-executive producer and directed two episodes with Stupnitsky, "Michael Scott Paper Company" and "The Lover". Although he is not credited for directing "Michael Scott Paper Company", similarly Stupnitsky is not credited for directing "The Lover", as only one person can be credited with directing the episode. They also directed The Outburst, a webisode series for The Office. He acted as Gino, one of the Vance Refrigeration delivery people, along with Stupnitsky, present in several episodes of The Office.

In 2013, Eisenberg and Stupnitsky were listed as two of Deadline Hollywood's "Overachievers" of pilot season. Along with Stephen Merchant, they created, executive produced, and wrote for the HBO series Hello Ladies, which ran for one season and concluded with a feature-length special. That same year, they wrote a pilot for ABC based on the BBC series Pulling, in addition to serving as executive producers on the series Trophy Wife on ABC. They also executive produced the series Bad Teacher for CBS, which is based on their original screenplay.

Eisenberg and Stupnitsky created the 2023 miniseries Jury Duty winning a Peabody Award for "wrapping up a lesson of civic responsibility within a warmhearted comedic tale, and for creating a bold feat of nonfiction storytelling that proves reality television can, surprisingly, bring out the best in all of us."

=== Film ===
Eisenberg and Stupnitsky have worked together on several screenplays, many of which they have produced as well. Along with Harold Ramis, they wrote the screenplay for Year One, which starred Jack Black and Michael Cera, and was released in 2009. Following that, they wrote and produced the film Bad Teacher, which starred Cameron Diaz and Justin Timberlake. They were to serve as producers of a proposed sequel.

Eisenberg and Stupnitsky wrote a screenplay for Ghostbusters III that was not used for the franchise. The duo also wrote the screenplay for Good Boys, which was released in 2019.

== Filmography ==
Film

Year	Title	Writer	Executive Producer
2009	Year One	Yes	No
2011	Bad Teacher	Yes	Yes
2019	Good Boys	Yes	No

TV

Year	Title	Director	Writer	Executive Producer	Creator	Notes
2002	The Mind of the Married Man	No	Yes	No	No	Wrote 1 episode
2005–2010	The Office	Yes	Yes	Yes	No	Wrote 16 episodes; Directed episodes "Michael Scott Paper Company" (Uncredited) and "The Lover"
2013–2014	Hello Ladies	No	Yes	Yes	Yes	Wrote 7 episodes
2013–2014	Trophy Wife	No	Yes	Yes	No	Wrote 1 episode
2014	Bad Teacher	No	No	Yes	No	
2016	Gorgeous Morons	No	Yes	Yes	Yes	Unaired pilot
2017	Downward Dog	No	No	Yes	No	Episode "Pilot"
2027–2019	SMILF	No	No	Yes	No	
2020–2022	Little America	No	Yes	Yes	Developer	Wrote 2 episodes
2022	WeCrashed	No	Yes	Yes	Yes	Wrote 1 episode
2022	Queer as Folk	No	No	Yes	No	
2023	Lessons in Chemistry	No	Yes	Yes	Yes	Wrote 4 episodes
2023–present	Jury Duty	No	No	Yes	Yes	Wrote 1 episode
2024	The Goat	No	No	Yes	No	Reality television series
2025–present	Stick	No	No	Yes	No	
2026	Brothers	No	Yes	Yes	Yes	Wrote 4 episodes
