= Gene Stupnitsky =

American television writer

- Гена Ступницький
- Born: Hena Stupnitsky; Kiev, Ukrainian SSR, Soviet Union (now Kyiv, Ukraine)
- Education: University of Iowa
- Occupations: Writer; producer; director

Gene Stupnitsky (Note: Ukrainian: Гена Ступницький, romanized: Hena Stupnytskyi) is a Ukrainian-born American film and television show maker. He usually works with Lee Eisenberg, with whom he founded Quantity Entertainment. From 2005 to 2010, he served as a writer, director and producer of the NBC sitcom The Office for which he earned three Primetime Emmy Award nominations. He served as a co-creator, writer, and producer of the HBO comedy series Hello Ladies (2013-2014). In 2023 he co-created the Peabody Award-winning series Jury Duty with Eisenberg. Stupnitsky worked on comedy films writing Year One (2009), and Bad Teacher (2011) and directing Good Boys (2019) and No Hard Feelings (2023).

== Early life and education ==
Stupnitsky was born in Kyiv, Ukrainian SSR, Soviet Union (present-day Kyiv, Ukraine) to Jewish parents. He grew up in the suburbs of Chicago. He attended Stevenson High School and graduated from the University of Iowa in 2000.

== Career ==
=== 2005–2011 ===
In 2005, Eisenberg and Stupnitsky joined the staff of the NBC comedy series The Office, where they remained from seasons 2 to 6. In addition to writing, he served as a co-executive producer and directed two episodes with Eisenberg, "Michael Scott Paper Company" and "The Lover". Although he is not credited for directing "The Lover", similarly Eisenberg is not credited for directing "Michael Scott Paper Company", as only one person can be credited with directing the episode. They directed The Outburst, a webisode series for The Office. He acted as Leo, one of the Vance Refrigeration delivery people, along with Eisenberg, present in several episodes of The Office. Stupnitsky, alongside Eisenberg, co-wrote two of the most critically acclaimed episodes, including "Dinner Party" and "Scott's Tots".

Eisenberg and Stupnitsky have worked together on several screenplays, many of which they have produced as well. Alongside Harold Ramis, they wrote the screenplay for Year One, which starred Jack Black and Michael Cera, and was released in 2009. Following that, they wrote and produced the film Bad Teacher, which starred Cameron Diaz and Justin Timberlake. They were to serve as producers of a proposed sequel. Eisenberg and Stupnitsky wrote a screenplay for Ghostbusters III, but it was never produced.

=== 2013–present ===
In 2013, Eisenberg and Stupnitsky were listed as two of Deadline Hollywood's "Overachievers" of the pilot season. Along with Stephen Merchant, they created, executive produced, and wrote for the HBO series Hello Ladies, which ran for one season and concluded with a feature-length special. That same year, they wrote a pilot for ABC based on the BBC series Pulling, in addition to serving as executive producers on the series Trophy Wife, which aired for one season on ABC. They also executive produced the TV series Bad Teacher for CBS, which is based on their original screenplay. Stupnitsky and Eisenberg co-created the hit television series Jury Duty, which won a 2023 Peabody Award.

Stupnitsky made his directorial debut with the 2019 comedy film Good Boys. The film drew mostly positive reviews and became a hit at the box office, grossing over $111 million. Next, he co-wrote and directed the sex comedy No Hard Feelings (2023), which starred Jennifer Lawrence. Stupnitsky came up with the plot of the film upon seeing a Craigslist ad and showed it to Lawrence, with whom he'd been friends with for years and surprised her with the script a couple of years later. The film grossed over $87 million at the box office, becoming the highest grossing original R-rated studio comedy since 2019 and his own Good Boys. Lawrence received a Golden Globe nomination for her performance and the film earned a Best Comedy nomination at the 29th Critics' Choice Awards.

Stupnitsky's next feature film will include reuniting with his No Hard Feelings star Jennifer Lawrence on Apple Studios' romantic comedy One Month Mark, with a script by Sophie Fleur de Bruijn. The script had previously been won in a massive bidding war between 40 producers, with major directors and actors chasing after it. After meeting with several directors for the project, Lawrence pushed for Stupnitsky as they had been wanting to work together again after their last film in 2023.

== Filmography ==
=== Film ===
Year	Title	Director	Writer	Executive Producer
2009	Year One	No	Yes	No
2011	Bad Teacher	No	Yes	Yes
2019	Good Boys	Yes	Yes	No
2023	No Hard Feelings	Yes	Yes	No

=== Television ===
Year	Title	Director	Writer	Executive Producer	Notes
2005–2010	The Office	Yes	Yes	Yes	15 episodes (writer), Directed episodes "The Lover" (uncredited) and "Michael Scott Paper Company"
2013–2014	Hello Ladies	No	Yes	Yes	Also creator
2014	Bad Teacher	No	No	Yes	
2014	Trophy Wife	No	Yes	Yes	Episode "Mother's Day"
2016	Gorgeous Morons	No	Yes	Yes	TV movie
2017	Downward Dog	No	No	Yes	Episode "Pilot"
2017	SMILF	No	No	Yes	9 episodes
2023–present	Jury Duty	No	No	Yes	Also creator

== Awards and nominations ==
Year	Title	Award	Category	Result
2008	Primetime Emmy Awards	Outstanding Comedy Series	The Office	Nominated
2008	Primetime Emmy Awards	Outstanding Writing for a Comedy Series	The Office	Nominated
2009	Primetime Emmy Awards	Outstanding Comedy Series	The Office	Nominated
2015	Primetime Emmy Awards	Outstanding Television Movie	Hello Ladies	Nominated
2015	Primetime Emmy Awards	Outstanding Writing for a Limited Series or Movie	Hello Ladies	Nominated
2006	Writers Guild of America Awards	Best New Series	The Office	Nominated
2006	Writers Guild of America Awards	Best Comedy Series	The Office	Nominated
2007	Writers Guild of America Awards	Best Comedy Series	The Office	Won
2008	Writers Guild of America Awards	Best Comedy Series	The Office	Nominated
2009	Writers Guild of America Awards	Best Comedy Series	The Office	Nominated
2010	Writers Guild of America Awards	Best Comedy Series	The Office	Nominated
2011	Writers Guild of America Awards	Best Comedy Series	The Office	Nominated
2018	Writers Guild of America Awards	Best Comedy Series	Master of None	Nominated
2019	Peabody Awards	Entertainment Honoree	Good Boys	Nominated
2023	SXSW Film Festival	Audience Award	Jury Duty	Won
