= List of The Office (American TV series) episodes =

The Office is an American television sitcom broadcast on NBC. Created as an adaptation by Greg Daniels of the British series of the same name, it is a mockumentary that follows the day-to-day lives of the employees of the Scranton, Pennsylvania branch of Dunder Mifflin, a fictional paper supply company. The series ran on NBC in the United States from March 24, 2005, to May 16, 2013. Additionally, nine spin-off series of webisodes of The Office have been aired on NBC.com.

The Office aired a short first season in 2005 that consisted of six episodes. This was followed by a full-length second season in 2005–06 that consisted of 22 episodes, and a third season in 2006–07, with 25 episodes. Due to the 2007–2008 Writers Guild of America strike, the fourth season that aired in 2007–08 consisted of 19 episodes. The fifth season aired during 2008–09 and consisted of 28 episodes. The sixth season aired during 2009–10 and consisted of 26 episodes. The seventh season aired during 2010–11 and consisted of 26 episodes. The eighth season aired during 2011–12 and consisted of 24 episodes. The ninth season aired during 2012–13 and consisted of 25 episodes. A total of 201 episodes of The Office aired over nine seasons.

The first set of webisodes, titled The Accountants, consisted of ten episodes and ran between the second and third seasons. Kevin's Loan consisted of four episodes and ran between the fourth and fifth seasons. The Outburst aired in the middle of the fifth season and consisted of four episodes. Blackmail aired during the end of the fifth season and consisted of four episodes. Subtle Sexuality aired during the beginning of the sixth season and consisted of three episodes. The Mentor aired near the end of the sixth season and consisted of four episodes. The 3rd Floor aired during the beginning of the seventh season and consisted of three episodes. The Podcast aired near the middle of the seventh season (was previously available on the season 6 DVD) and consisted of three episodes. The latest webisode series, The Girl Next Door aired at the end of the seventh season and had two episodes.

All nine seasons are available on DVD in regions 1, 2, and 4. Starting with season five, the series is available on Blu-ray. This list is ordered by the episodes' original air dates and not by the production code numbers provided by NBC's official episode guide, which show the order in which episodes were filmed.

After the acquisition of the series by the streaming service Peacock, extended format episodes designated "Superfan Episodes" were released beginning in 2021 exclusive to Peacock, including deleted scenes and additional footage.

== Series overview ==
Season	Episodes	Originally released		Rank	Average viewership (in millions)
Season	Episodes	First released	Last released	Rank	Average viewership (in millions)
1	6	March 24, 2005	April 26, 2005	102	5.4
2	22	September 20, 2005	May 11, 2006	67	8.0
3	25	September 21, 2006	May 17, 2007	68	8.3
4	19	September 27, 2007	May 15, 2008	77	8.9
5	28	September 25, 2008	May 14, 2009	52	9.0
6	26	September 17, 2009	May 20, 2010	52	7.8
7	26	September 23, 2010	May 19, 2011	53	7.7
8	24	September 22, 2011	May 10, 2012	87	6.5
9	25	September 20, 2012	May 16, 2013	94	5.1

== Episodes ==
=== Season 1 (2005) ===
Season one aired between March 24 and April 26, 2005. It originally debuted as a midseason replacement for Committed. It carried over general plot ideas from the earlier British series created by Stephen Merchant and Ricky Gervais, and particularly the threat of wholesale downsizing. However, only the pilot was a direct adaptation of one of the UK version's episodes.

This season introduced the main characters, and established the general plot as a documentary crew is recording the lives of the employees of the fictitious Dunder Mifflin Paper Company. In a mockumentary format, it shows Michael Scott (Steve Carell), regional manager of the Scranton branch office, as he tries to convince the filmmakers of the documentary that he presides over a happy, well-running office. Meanwhile, sales rep Jim Halpert (John Krasinski) finds methods to undermine his cube-mate, Dwight Schrute (Rainn Wilson); receptionist Pam Beesly (Jenna Fischer) is trying to deal with Michael's insensitivities and flubs; and the temporary employee Ryan Howard (B. J. Novak) is acting mostly as an observer of the insanity around him.

No. overall	No. in season	Title	Directed by	Written by	Original release date	Prod. code	U.S. viewers (millions)
1	1	"Pilot"	Ken Kwapis	Ricky Gervais & Stephen Merchant and Greg Daniels	March 24, 2005	1001	11.23
2	2	"Diversity Day"	Ken Kwapis	B. J. Novak	March 29, 2005	1002	5.95
3	3	"Health Care"	Ken Whittingham	Paul Lieberstein	April 5, 2005	1006	5.83
4	4	"The Alliance"	Bryan Gordon	Michael Schur	April 12, 2005	1004	5.26
5	5	"Basketball"	Greg Daniels	Greg Daniels	April 19, 2005	1005	5.03
6	6	"Hot Girl"	Amy Heckerling	Mindy Kaling	April 26, 2005	1003	4.83

=== Season 2 (2005–06) ===
Season two of The Office premiered on September 20, 2005, and ended on May 11, 2006. NBC initially ordered only six episodes for the season, then in September ordered seven more. On November 3, 2005, NBC ordered an additional three, and in the end it had ordered a full season of 22 episodes.

The second season storyline further delved into the fear of company downsizing, along with the introduction of new characters and developing some of the minor ones—especially that of Dwight. As Michael begins a relationship with his boss Jan Levinson (Melora Hardin), Pam and Jim's relationship becomes one of the focal points of the season. Their compatibility becomes more obvious as Jim's feelings for Pam continue to grow, while she struggles with her engagement to warehouse worker Roy Anderson (David Denman).

No. overall	No. in season	Title	Directed by	Written by	Original release date	Prod. code	U.S. viewers (millions)
7	1	"The Dundies"	Greg Daniels	Mindy Kaling	September 20, 2005	2003	9.00
8	2	"Sexual Harassment"	Ken Kwapis	B. J. Novak	September 27, 2005	2002	7.13
9	3	"Office Olympics"	Paul Feig	Michael Schur	October 4, 2005	2004	8.27
10	4	"The Fire"	Ken Kwapis	B. J. Novak	October 11, 2005	2001	7.62
11	5	"Halloween"	Paul Feig	Greg Daniels	October 18, 2005	2006	8.02
12	6	"The Fight"	Ken Kwapis	Gene Stupnitsky & Lee Eisenberg	November 1, 2005	2007	7.93
13	7	"The Client"	Greg Daniels	Paul Lieberstein	November 8, 2005	2005	7.46
14	8	"Performance Review"	Paul Feig	Larry Wilmore	November 15, 2005	2009	7.99
15	9	"Email Surveillance"	Paul Feig	Jennifer Celotta	November 22, 2005	2008	8.09
16	10	"Christmas Party"	Charles McDougall	Michael Schur	December 6, 2005	2010	9.74
17	11	"Booze Cruise"	Ken Kwapis	Greg Daniels	January 5, 2006	2013	8.73
18	12	"The Injury"	Bryan Gordon	Mindy Kaling	January 12, 2006	2011	10.27
19	13	"The Secret"	Dennie Gordon	Lee Eisenberg & Gene Stupnitsky	January 19, 2006	2014	8.70
20	14	"The Carpet"	Victor Nelli, Jr.	Paul Lieberstein	January 26, 2006	2012	8.60
21	15	"Boys and Girls"	Dennie Gordon	B. J. Novak	February 2, 2006	2015	9.21
22	16	"Valentine's Day"	Greg Daniels	Michael Schur	February 9, 2006	2016	8.95
23	17	"Dwight's Speech"	Charles McDougall	Paul Lieberstein	March 2, 2006	2017	8.45
24	18	"Take Your Daughter to Work Day"	Victor Nelli, Jr.	Mindy Kaling	March 16, 2006	2018	8.85
25	19	"Michael's Birthday"	Ken Whittingham	Gene Stupnitsky & Lee Eisenberg	March 30, 2006	2019	7.85
26	20	"Drug Testing"	Greg Daniels	Jennifer Celotta	April 27, 2006	2022	7.85
27	21	"Conflict Resolution"	Charles McDougall	Greg Daniels	May 4, 2006	2020	7.45
28	22	"Casino Night"^{†}	Ken Kwapis	Steve Carell	May 11, 2006	2021	7.66

=== Season 3 (2006–07) ===
Season three premiered on September 21, 2006, and ended on May 17, 2007. It featured 25 episodes, including two hour-long episodes, six "super-sized" episodes, and guest directors such as J. J. Abrams, Joss Whedon and Harold Ramis.

The season marked the move of main character Jim Halpert from Scranton to Stamford, and also introduced Rashida Jones as Karen Filippelli, and Ed Helms as Andy Bernard (both members of Dunder Mifflin Stamford) as recurring characters. Helms would later be promoted to series regular. The main plot for the early episodes of the season deals with a recurring problem in seasons one and two—the problem of company downsizing—while in the latter half of the season, inter-office relationships also became a major plot point. Metacritic, which assigns normalized ratings out of 100 to critics' reviews, calculated an average score of 85/100 based on five collected reviews, indicating "universal acclaim".

No. overall	No. in season	Title	Directed by	Written by	Original release date	Prod. code	U.S. viewers (millions)
29	1	"Gay Witch Hunt"	Ken Kwapis	Greg Daniels	September 21, 2006	3001	9.11
30	2	"The Convention"	Ken Whittingham	Lee Eisenberg & Gene Stupnitsky	September 28, 2006	3006	7.78
31	3	"The Coup"	Greg Daniels	Paul Lieberstein	October 5, 2006	3002	8.89
32	4	"Grief Counseling"	Roger Nygard	Jennifer Celotta	October 12, 2006	3003	8.83
33	5	"Initiation"	Randall Einhorn	B. J. Novak	October 19, 2006	3005	8.46
34	6	"Diwali"	Miguel Arteta	Mindy Kaling	November 2, 2006	3004	8.81
35	7	"Branch Closing"^{†}	Tucker Gates	Michael Schur	November 9, 2006	3007	8.05
36	8	"The Merger"^{†}	Ken Whittingham	Brent Forrester	November 16, 2006	3008	8.43
37	9	"The Convict"	Jeffrey Blitz	Ricky Gervais & Stephen Merchant	November 30, 2006	3010	9.07
38	10	"A Benihana Christmas"^{‡}	Harold Ramis	Jennifer Celotta	December 14, 2006	3009	8.44
39	11	"A Benihana Christmas"^{‡}	Harold Ramis	Jennifer Celotta	December 14, 2006	3014	8.44
40	12	"Back from Vacation"	Julian Farino	Justin Spitzer	January 4, 2007	3011	8.80
41	13	"Traveling Salesmen"	Greg Daniels	Michael Schur & Lee Eisenberg & Gene Stupnitsky	January 11, 2007	3012	10.15
42	14	"The Return"^{†}	Greg Daniels	Lee Eisenberg & Gene Stupnitsky & Michael Schur	January 18, 2007	3013	9.32
43	15	"Ben Franklin"	Randall Einhorn	Mindy Kaling	February 1, 2007	3015	10.01
44	16	"Phyllis' Wedding"	Ken Whittingham	Caroline Williams	February 8, 2007	3016	8.84
45	17	"Business School"	Joss Whedon	Brent Forrester	February 15, 2007	3017	8.84
46	18	"Cocktails"	J. J. Abrams	Paul Lieberstein	February 22, 2007	3018	8.25
47	19	"The Negotiation"^{†}	Jeffrey Blitz	Michael Schur	April 5, 2007	3019	6.74
48	20	"Safety Training"	Harold Ramis	B. J. Novak	April 12, 2007	3020	7.71
49	21	"Product Recall"	Randall Einhorn	Justin Spitzer & Brent Forrester	April 26, 2007	3025	7.56
50	22	"Women's Appreciation"^{†}	Tucker Gates	Gene Stupnitsky & Lee Eisenberg	May 3, 2007	3021	6.99
51	23	"Beach Games"^{†}	Harold Ramis	Jennifer Celotta & Greg Daniels	May 10, 2007	3022	7.17
52	24	"The Job"^{‡}	Ken Kwapis	Paul Lieberstein & Michael Schur	May 17, 2007	3023	7.88
53	25	"The Job"^{‡}	Ken Kwapis	Paul Lieberstein & Michael Schur	May 17, 2007	3024	7.88

=== Season 4 (2007–08) ===
NBC ordered a full fourth season of The Office consisting of 30 episodes, which included five one-hour specials. However, the 2007–2008 Writers Guild of America strike shut down production for nearly five months in the middle of the season (between the episodes "The Deposition" and "Dinner Party"). Because of the shutdown, the fourth season of The Office only consisted of 19 half-hour episodes, ten of which were paired as five separate hour-long episodes. The season premiered on September 27, 2007.

Season four marked the departure of Karen Filippelli as a regular character, although she appeared for a few seconds in the first episode, "Fun Run"; and was featured as the regional manager of the Utica branch in the tenth episode, "Branch Wars". Relationships emerged as the main theme of the season, with Jim and Pam's rising, as well as Michael and Jan's and Dwight and Angela's declining. Technology was another theme as the office staff struggled with initiatives introduced by Ryan to modernize the company.

No. overall	No. in season	Title	Directed by	Written by	Original release date	Prod. code	U.S. viewers (millions)
54	1	"Fun Run"^{‡}	Greg Daniels	Greg Daniels	September 27, 2007	4001	9.65
55	2	"Fun Run"^{‡}	Greg Daniels	Greg Daniels	September 27, 2007	4002	9.65
56	3	"Dunder Mifflin Infinity"^{‡}	Craig Zisk	Michael Schur	October 4, 2007	4003	8.57
57	4	"Dunder Mifflin Infinity"^{‡}	Craig Zisk	Michael Schur	October 4, 2007	4004	8.57
58	5	"Launch Party"^{‡}	Ken Whittingham	Jennifer Celotta	October 11, 2007	4005	8.87
59	6	"Launch Party"^{‡}	Ken Whittingham	Jennifer Celotta	October 11, 2007	4006	8.87
60	7	"Money"^{‡}	Paul Lieberstein	Paul Lieberstein	October 18, 2007	4007	8.61
61	8	"Money"^{‡}	Paul Lieberstein	Paul Lieberstein	October 18, 2007	4008	8.61
62	9	"Local Ad"	Jason Reitman	B. J. Novak	October 25, 2007	4009	8.96
63	10	"Branch Wars"	Joss Whedon	Mindy Kaling	November 1, 2007	4010	8.36
64	11	"Survivor Man"	Paul Feig	Steve Carell	November 8, 2007	4011	8.27
65	12	"The Deposition"	Julian Farino	Lester Lewis	November 15, 2007	4012	8.80
66	13	"Dinner Party"	Paul Feig	Gene Stupnitsky & Lee Eisenberg	April 10, 2008	4013	9.33
67	14	"Chair Model"	Jeffrey Blitz	B. J. Novak	April 17, 2008	4014	9.86
68	15	"Night Out"	Ken Whittingham	Mindy Kaling	April 24, 2008	4015	7.69
69	16	"Did I Stutter?"	Randall Einhorn	Brent Forrester & Justin Spitzer	May 1, 2008	4016	7.75
70	17	"Job Fair"	Tucker Gates	Lee Eisenberg & Gene Stupnitsky	May 8, 2008	4017	7.16
71	18	"Goodbye, Toby"^{‡}	Paul Feig	Jennifer Celotta & Paul Lieberstein	May 15, 2008	4018	8.21
72	19	"Goodbye, Toby"^{‡}	Paul Feig	Jennifer Celotta & Paul Lieberstein	May 15, 2008	4019	8.21

=== Season 5 (2008–09) ===
On April 10, 2008, NBC ordered a fifth season consisting of 28 half-hour episodes, four of which were paired as two hour-long episodes. The season premiered on September 25, 2008.

This season highlighted Michael's roller coaster relationship with corporate, as he is first praised and rewarded for impressive numbers despite the economic downturn. However, when a new boss is hired Michael feels slighted by his controlling manner. The theme of the beginning and middle of the season was mostly personal relationships with Dwight, Angela, Andy, Jim, Pam, Michael, Jan, and Holly. However, the theme transformed into career growth, as Ryan, Pam, and Michael set up the Michael Scott Paper Company, Pam and Michael go on a lecture circuit, Charles takes Jan's and Ryan's job, and Jim has trouble getting on with Charles. The last few episodes of the season focused on relationships once again, with major events taking place in Jim and Pam's relationship, and also with Holly and Michael.

No. overall	No. in season	Title	Directed by	Written by	Original release date	Prod. code	U.S. viewers (millions)
73	1	"Weight Loss"^{‡}	Paul Feig	Lee Eisenberg & Gene Stupnitsky	September 25, 2008	5001	9.34
74	2	"Weight Loss"^{‡}	Paul Feig	Lee Eisenberg & Gene Stupnitsky	September 25, 2008	5002	9.34
75	3	"Business Ethics"	Jeffrey Blitz	Ryan Koh	October 9, 2008	5003	9.25
76	4	"Baby Shower"	Greg Daniels	Aaron Shure	October 16, 2008	5004	8.28
77	5	"Crime Aid"	Jennifer Celotta	Charlie Grandy	October 23, 2008	5005	7.98
78	6	"Employee Transfer"	David Rogers	Anthony Q. Farrell	October 30, 2008	5006	9.51
79	7	"Customer Survey"	Stephen Merchant	Lester Lewis	November 6, 2008	5007	8.55
80	8	"Business Trip"	Randall Einhorn	Brent Forrester	November 13, 2008	5009	8.30
81	9	"Frame Toby"	Jason Reitman	Mindy Kaling	November 20, 2008	5008	8.31
82	10	"The Surplus"	Paul Feig	Gene Stupnitsky & Lee Eisenberg	December 4, 2008	5013	8.46
83	11	"Moroccan Christmas"	Paul Feig	Justin Spitzer	December 11, 2008	5010	8.76
84	12	"The Duel"	Dean Holland	Jennifer Celotta	January 15, 2009	5011	8.49
85	13	"Prince Family Paper"	Asaad Kelada	B. J. Novak	January 22, 2009	5012	8.76
86	14	"Stress Relief"^{‡}	Jeffrey Blitz	Paul Lieberstein	February 1, 2009	5016	22.91
87	15	"Stress Relief"^{‡}	Jeffrey Blitz	Paul Lieberstein	February 1, 2009	5017	22.91
88	16	"Lecture Circuit: Part 1"	Ken Kwapis	Mindy Kaling	February 5, 2009	5014	8.48
89	17	"Lecture Circuit: Part 2"	Ken Kwapis	Mindy Kaling	February 12, 2009	5015	9.00
90	18	"Blood Drive"	Randall Einhorn	Brent Forrester	March 5, 2009	5018	8.54
91	19	"Golden Ticket"	Randall Einhorn	Mindy Kaling	March 12, 2009	5019	7.67
92	20	"New Boss"	Paul Feig	Lee Eisenberg & Gene Stupnitsky	March 19, 2009	5020	8.07
93	21	"Two Weeks"	Paul Lieberstein	Aaron Shure	March 26, 2009	5021	8.65
94	22	"Dream Team"	Paul Feig	B. J. Novak	April 9, 2009	5022	7.32
95	23	"Michael Scott Paper Company"	Gene Stupnitsky	Justin Spitzer	April 9, 2009	5023	8.02
96	24	"Heavy Competition"	Ken Whittingham	Ryan Koh	April 16, 2009	5024	8.37
97	25	"Broke"	Steve Carell	Charlie Grandy	April 23, 2009	5025	7.28
98	26	"Casual Friday"	Brent Forrester	Anthony Q. Farrell	April 30, 2009	5026	7.41
99	27	"Cafe Disco"	Randall Einhorn	Warren Lieberstein & Halsted Sullivan	May 7, 2009	5027	7.85
100	28	"Company Picnic"	Ken Kwapis	Jennifer Celotta & Paul Lieberstein	May 14, 2009	5028	6.77

=== Season 6 (2009–10) ===
On January 15, 2009, it was announced that NBC renewed the series for a sixth season, consisting of 26 half-hour episodes, four of which were paired as two hour-long episodes. The season premiered on September 17, 2009.

Story arcs in the sixth season include Jim becoming co-manager with Michael of the Scranton branch, Michael dating Pam's mother, Dwight attempting to get Jim fired, and Dunder Mifflin facing an uncertain future due to rumors of insolvency, eventually becoming part of a larger corporation called Sabre. The season also prominently features the long-awaited wedding between Jim and Pam, as well as the birth of their first child.

No. overall	No. in season	Title	Directed by	Written by	Original release date	Prod. code	U.S. viewers (millions)
101	1	"Gossip"	Paul Lieberstein	Paul Lieberstein	September 17, 2009	6001	8.21
102	2	"The Meeting"	Randall Einhorn	Aaron Shure	September 24, 2009	6002	7.46
103	3	"The Promotion"	Jennifer Celotta	Jennifer Celotta	October 1, 2009	6003	7.41
104	4	"Niagara"^{‡}	Paul Feig	Greg Daniels & Mindy Kaling	October 8, 2009	6004	9.42
105	5	"Niagara"^{‡}	Paul Feig	Greg Daniels & Mindy Kaling	October 8, 2009	6005	9.42
106	6	"Mafia"	David Rogers	Brent Forrester	October 15, 2009	6006	8.03
107	7	"The Lover"	Lee Eisenberg	Lee Eisenberg & Gene Stupnitsky	October 22, 2009	6007	8.73
108	8	"Koi Pond"	Reggie Hudlin	Warren Lieberstein & Halsted Sullivan	October 29, 2009	6009	8.21
109	9	"Double Date"	Seth Gordon	Charlie Grandy	November 5, 2009	6008	8.09
110	10	"Murder"	Greg Daniels	Daniel Chun	November 12, 2009	6010	8.05
111	11	"Shareholder Meeting"	Charles McDougall	Justin Spitzer	November 19, 2009	6011	7.39
112	12	"Scott's Tots"	B. J. Novak	Gene Stupnitsky & Lee Eisenberg	December 3, 2009	6013	8.05
113	13	"Secret Santa"	Randall Einhorn	Mindy Kaling	December 10, 2009	6014	8.51
114	14	"The Banker"	Jeffrey Blitz	Jason Kessler	January 21, 2010	6012	7.28
115	15	"Sabre"	John Krasinski	Jennifer Celotta	February 4, 2010	6015	7.37
116	16	"The Manager and the Salesman"	Marc Webb	Mindy Kaling	February 11, 2010	6016	7.44
117	17	"The Delivery"^{‡}	Seth Gordon	Daniel Chun	March 4, 2010	6018	9.02
118	18	"The Delivery"^{‡}	Harold Ramis	Charlie Grandy	March 4, 2010	6019	9.02
119	19	"St. Patrick's Day"	Randall Einhorn	Jonathan Hughes	March 11, 2010	6017	7.43
120	20	"New Leads"	Brent Forrester	Brent Forrester	March 18, 2010	6020	7.67
121	21	"Happy Hour"	Matt Sohn	B. J. Novak	March 25, 2010	6021	7.28
122	22	"Secretary's Day"	Steve Carell	Mindy Kaling	April 22, 2010	6022	6.30
123	23	"Body Language"	Mindy Kaling	Justin Spitzer	April 29, 2010	6023	7.01
124	24	"The Cover-Up"	Rainn Wilson	Gene Stupnitsky & Lee Eisenberg	May 6, 2010	6024	6.84
125	25	"The Chump"	Randall Einhorn	Aaron Shure	May 13, 2010	6025	6.60
126	26	"Whistleblower"	Paul Lieberstein	Warren Lieberstein & Halsted Sullivan	May 20, 2010	6026	6.64

=== Season 7 (2010–11) ===
On March 5, 2010, NBC officially announced that it had renewed The Office for a seventh season, consisting of 26 half-hour episodes, four of which were paired as two hour-long episodes. Steve Carell confirmed the season would be his last on the series. The season premiered on September 23, 2010.

The seventh season of The Office largely revolves around the character development and departure of Michael from the series. After Toby is called for jury duty, Holly returns, causing Michael to once again pursue her, despite her being in a relationship. After eventually proving himself to her, the two get engaged, but Michael decides to move to Boulder, Colorado to help Holly take care of her elderly parents. After Michael leaves, the office is forced to choose a new manager.

No. overall	No. in season	Title	Directed by	Written by	Original release date	Prod. code	U.S. viewers (millions)
127	1	"Nepotism"	Jeffrey Blitz	Daniel Chun	September 23, 2010	7001	8.48
128	2	"Counseling"	Jeffrey Blitz	B. J. Novak	September 30, 2010	7002	7.36
129	3	"Andy's Play"	John Stuart Scott	Charlie Grandy	October 7, 2010	7003	6.95
130	4	"Sex Ed"	Paul Lieberstein	Paul Lieberstein	October 14, 2010	7004	7.36
131	5	"The Sting"	Randall Einhorn	Mindy Kaling	October 21, 2010	7005	6.87
132	6	"Costume Contest"	Dean Holland	Justin Spitzer	October 28, 2010	7006	8.07
133	7	"Christening"	Alex Hardcastle	Peter Ocko	November 4, 2010	7007	7.65
134	8	"Viewing Party"	Ken Whittingham	Jon Vitti	November 11, 2010	7008	7.15
135	9	"WUPHF.com"	Danny Leiner	Aaron Shure	November 18, 2010	7009	7.28
136	10	"China"	Charles McDougall	Halsted Sullivan & Warren Lieberstein	December 2, 2010	7010	7.31
137	11	"Classy Christmas"^{‡}	Rainn Wilson	Mindy Kaling	December 9, 2010	7011	7.18
138	12	"Classy Christmas"^{‡}	Rainn Wilson	Mindy Kaling	December 9, 2010	7012	7.18
139	13	"Ultimatum"	David Rogers	Carrie Kemper	January 20, 2011	7013	8.26
140	14	"The Seminar"	B. J. Novak	Steve Hely	January 27, 2011	7014	7.93
141	15	"The Search"	Michael Spiller	Brent Forrester	February 3, 2011	7015	7.29
142	16	"PDA"	Greg Daniels	Robert Padnick	February 10, 2011	7017	6.90
143	17	"Threat Level Midnight"	Tucker Gates	B. J. Novak	February 17, 2011	7016	6.41
144	18	"Todd Packer"	Randall Einhorn	Amelie Gillette	February 24, 2011	7018	6.12
145	19	"Garage Sale"	Steve Carell	Jon Vitti	March 24, 2011	7019	7.07
146	20	"Training Day"	Paul Lieberstein	Daniel Chun	April 14, 2011	7020	7.87
147	21	"Michael's Last Dundies"	Mindy Kaling	Mindy Kaling	April 21, 2011	7021	6.85
148	22	"Goodbye, Michael"^{†}	Paul Feig	Greg Daniels	April 28, 2011	7022	8.42
149	23	"The Inner Circle"	Matt Sohn	Charlie Grandy	May 5, 2011	7023	6.90
150	24	"Dwight K. Schrute, (Acting) Manager"	Troy Miller	Justin Spitzer	May 12, 2011	7024	6.45
151	25	"Search Committee"^{‡}	Jeffrey Blitz	Paul Lieberstein	May 19, 2011	7025	7.29
152	26	"Search Committee"^{‡}	Jeffrey Blitz	Paul Lieberstein	May 19, 2011	7026	7.29

=== Season 8 (2011–12) ===
On March 17, 2011, NBC renewed The Office for an eighth season, consisting of 24 episodes. This season focuses on Andy Bernard becoming manager of the Scranton branch, before being replaced as manager by Nellie Bertram (Catherine Tate) midway through the season. James Spader also became a regular cast member, playing the role of Robert California, the new CEO of Sabre. Also, Jim and Pam welcome their second child.

The eighth season of The Office largely centers around the antics of the new Sabre CEO, Robert California. Initially, he appears calm, collected, and calculating. However, as the season progresses, it becomes obvious that his management style is slowly destroying the company. Dwight—along with Jim, Stanley, Ryan, Erin, and Cathy (Lindsey Broad)—travel to Florida to help set up a Sabre Store, where Nellie Bertram (Catherine Tate) is introduced. Eventually, former CFO of Dunder Mifflin David Wallace buys back the company, firing California.

No. overall	No. in season	Title	Directed by	Written by	Original release date	Prod. code	U.S. viewers (millions)
153	1	"The List"	B. J. Novak	B. J. Novak	September 22, 2011	8002	7.64
154	2	"The Incentive"	Charles McDougall	Paul Lieberstein	September 29, 2011	8001	6.70
155	3	"Lotto"	John Krasinski	Charlie Grandy	October 6, 2011	8005	5.82
156	4	"Garden Party"	David Rogers	Justin Spitzer	October 13, 2011	8004	6.08
157	5	"Spooked"	Randall Einhorn	Carrie Kemper	October 27, 2011	8006	5.53
158	6	"Doomsday"	Troy Miller	Daniel Chun	November 3, 2011	8003	6.15
159	7	"Pam's Replacement"	Matt Sohn	Allison Silverman	November 10, 2011	8007	5.96
160	8	"Gettysburg"	Jeffrey Blitz	Robert Padnick	November 17, 2011	8008	5.50
161	9	"Mrs. California"	Charlie Grandy	Dan Greaney	December 1, 2011	8009	5.71
162	10	"Christmas Wishes"	Ed Helms	Mindy Kaling	December 8, 2011	8010	5.79
163	11	"Trivia"	B. J. Novak	Steve Hely	January 12, 2012	8011	5.90
164	12	"Pool Party"	Charles McDougall	Owen Ellickson	January 19, 2012	8012	6.02
165	13	"Jury Duty"	Eric Appel	Aaron Shure	February 2, 2012	8013	5.31
166	14	"Special Project"	David Rogers	Amelie Gillette	February 9, 2012	8014	5.19
167	15	"Tallahassee"	Matt Sohn	Daniel Chun	February 16, 2012	8015	4.38
168	16	"After Hours"	Brian Baumgartner	Halsted Sullivan & Warren Lieberstein	February 23, 2012	8016	5.02
169	17	"Test the Store"	Brent Forrester	Mindy Kaling	March 1, 2012	8017	4.95
170	18	"Last Day in Florida"	Matt Sohn	Robert Padnick	March 8, 2012	8018	4.89
171	19	"Get the Girl"	Rainn Wilson	Charlie Grandy	March 15, 2012	8019	4.87
172	20	"Welcome Party"	Ed Helms	Steve Hely	April 12, 2012	8020	4.39
173	21	"Angry Andy"	Claire Scanlon	Justin Spitzer	April 19, 2012	8021	4.35
174	22	"Fundraiser"	David Rogers	Owen Ellickson	April 26, 2012	8022	4.17
175	23	"Turf War"	Daniel Chun	Warren Lieberstein & Halsted Sullivan	May 3, 2012	8023	4.44
176	24	"Free Family Portrait Studio"	B. J. Novak	B. J. Novak	May 10, 2012	8024	4.49

=== Season 9 (2012–13) ===
On May 11, 2012, NBC renewed The Office for a ninth season, which was later announced to be the final season. The season consists of 25 episodes.

The ninth season largely focuses on the relationship between Jim and Pam Halpert. After Jim decides to follow his dream and start a sports marketing company in Philadelphia, Pam begins to worry about moving, and the couple's relationship experiences stress. Meanwhile, Andy abandons the office for a three-month boating trip, and eventually quits his job to pursue his dream of becoming a star. Dwight is then promoted to regional manager.

No. overall	No. in season	Title	Directed by	Written by	Original release date	Prod. code	U.S. viewers (millions)
177	1	"New Guys"	Greg Daniels	Greg Daniels	September 20, 2012	9001	4.28
178	2	"Roy's Wedding"	Matt Sohn	Allison Silverman	September 27, 2012	9002	4.13
179	3	"Andy's Ancestry"	David Rogers	Jonathan Green & Gabe Miller	October 4, 2012	9003	4.14
180	4	"Work Bus"	Bryan Cranston	Brent Forrester	October 18, 2012	9004	4.28
181	5	"Here Comes Treble"	Claire Scanlon	Owen Ellickson	October 25, 2012	9006	4.00
182	6	"The Boat"	John Krasinski	Dan Sterling	November 8, 2012	9007	4.83
183	7	"The Whale"	Rodman Flender	Carrie Kemper	November 15, 2012	9008	4.16
184	8	"The Target"	Brent Forrester	Graham Wagner	November 29, 2012	9009	3.88
185	9	"Dwight Christmas"	Charles McDougall	Robert Padnick	December 6, 2012	9010	4.16
186	10	"Lice"	Rodman Flender	Niki Schwartz-Wright	January 10, 2013	9011	4.54
187	11	"Suit Warehouse"	Matt Sohn	Dan Greaney	January 17, 2013	9012	4.15
188	12	"Customer Loyalty"	Kelly Cantley	Jonathan Green & Gabe Miller	January 24, 2013	9013	4.19
189	13	"Junior Salesman"	David Rogers	Carrie Kemper	January 31, 2013	9014	4.45
190	14	"Vandalism"	Lee Kirk	Owen Ellickson	January 31, 2013	9015	3.97
191	15	"Couples Discount"	Troy Miller	Allison Silverman	February 7, 2013	9016	4.15
192	16	"Moving On"^{‡}	Jon Favreau	Graham Wagner	February 14, 2013	9017	4.06
193	17	"The Farm"	Paul Lieberstein	Paul Lieberstein	March 14, 2013	9005	3.54
194	18	"Promos"	Jennifer Celotta	Tim McAuliffe	April 4, 2013	9018	3.44
195	19	"Stairmageddon"	Matt Sohn	Dan Sterling	April 11, 2013	9019	3.83
196	20	"Paper Airplane"	Jesse Peretz	Halsted Sullivan & Warren Lieberstein	April 25, 2013	9020	3.25
197	21	"Livin' the Dream"^{‡}	Jeffrey Blitz	Niki Schwartz-Wright	May 2, 2013	9021	3.51
198	22	"A.A.R.M."^{‡}	David Rogers	Brent Forrester	May 9, 2013	9022	4.56
199	23	"A.A.R.M."^{‡}	David Rogers	Brent Forrester	May 9, 2013	9023	4.56
200	24	"Finale"^{*}	Ken Kwapis	Greg Daniels	May 16, 2013	9024	5.69
201	25	"Finale"^{*}	Ken Kwapis	Greg Daniels	May 16, 2013	9025	5.69

- ^† denotes a "super-sized" 40-minute episode (with advertisements; actual runtime around 28 minutes).
- ^‡ denotes an hour-long episode (with advertisements; actual runtime around 42 minutes).
- ^* denotes an extended 75-minute episode (with advertisements; actual runtime around 52 minutes).

== Ratings ==
The Office : U.S. viewers per episode (millions)
Audience measurement performed by Nielsen Media Research

== Webisodes ==
=== The Accountants (2006) ===
NBC announced on March 16, 2006, that there would be ten original, stand-alone webisode shorts on NBC.com. They debuted on July 13, and concluded on September 7, 2006. They were directed by Randall Einhorn and written by Michael Schur and Paul Lieberstein, and were edited by Michael Zurer, an assistant editor on the series. It took two days to film them, and in June 2007, The Accountants won the Comedy Short Award at the inaugural Webby Awards and a Daytime Emmy Award for Outstanding Broadband Program – Comedy. In November 2007, the webisodes became a point of argument for the Writers Guild of America for the 2007 strike, as none of the writers or actors featured in the webisodes were paid residuals for their participation.

Major characters Michael, Jim and Pam do not appear in The Accountants webisodes. Instead, the focus is on the three members of the accounting department: Oscar, Angela and Kevin—who appear in each webisode—as they try to find $3000 missing from the office budget. The series won an Emmy Award in the "Outstanding Broadband Program – Comedy" category at the 34th Daytime Emmy Awards in 2007. Tim Stack of Entertainment Weekly graded the series with an "A−" and wrote, "While we miss Jim and Pam (not to mention star Steve Carell), these shorts prove that spending time with their excessively awkward co-workers can be just as sweet."

No.	Title	Directed by	Written by	Original release date
1	"The Books Don't Balance"	Randall Einhorn	Michael Schur & Paul Lieberstein	July 13, 2006
The accountants inform Jan that the books don't balance and $3000 is missing. The accountants decide to interrogate the other office employees, but Oscar is sure Michael took it.
2	"Phyllis"	Randall Einhorn	Michael Schur & Paul Lieberstein	July 13, 2006
The accountants question Phyllis and she makes a confession that she borrowed $14 and forgot to report it.
3	"Meredith"	Randall Einhorn	Michael Schur & Paul Lieberstein	July 20, 2006
Meredith is the next employee to be questioned. She claims that she wouldn't be at work if she did and wouldn't risk getting arrested because she has a son to take care of. She also indicates she has already lost custody of her other child, a daughter, so would not risk it.
4	"Stanley"	Randall Einhorn	Michael Schur & Paul Lieberstein	July 27, 2006
The accountants talk to Stanley. Stanley thinks whoever did it is smart to steal that much.
5	"Someone in the Warehouse"	Randall Einhorn	Michael Schur & Paul Lieberstein	August 3, 2006
Kevin thinks Angela has a crush on Roy, who ends up being questioned next, but he doesn't even know how to take $3000 out of petty cash.
6	"The Memo"	Randall Einhorn	Michael Schur & Paul Lieberstein	August 10, 2006
Kevin types a memo for the thief to come forward. Kevin gets ticked off that Angela is bossing him around and makes a fake memo for himself.
7	"Things Are Getting Tense"	Randall Einhorn	Michael Schur & Paul Lieberstein	August 17, 2006
With new developments, the accountants start turning on each other.
8	"You're Mean"	Randall Einhorn	Michael Schur & Paul Lieberstein	August 24, 2006
The accountants wait for Michael to leave his office so that they can check to see if he stole the money, and Angela is mean to Kevin.
9	"Michael's Office"	Randall Einhorn	Michael Schur & Paul Lieberstein	August 31, 2006
The accountants check Michael's office for evidence of the money. After finding nothing but inexpensive, useless novelty items, Oscar and Kevin unanimously decide Angela must talk to him.
10	"The Best Day of My Life"	Randall Einhorn	Michael Schur & Paul Lieberstein	September 7, 2006
Dwight confronts Angela about her decision to accuse Michael of taking the money. Kevin and Oscar discover that the missing funds are merely an accounting mistake made by Angela, upon which Kevin declares "this is the best day of my life."

=== Kevin's Loan (2008) ===
NBC ordered a new set of webisodes for the summer of 2008. The webisode series began its run on July 10, 2008, and ended on July 31, 2008. The webisodes feature Kevin, who pursues a unique solution in an effort to pay back his looming gambling debts. The other characters who appeared are Oscar, Stanley and Darryl.

No.	Title	Directed by	Written by	Original release date
1	"Money Trouble"	Brent Forrester	Anthony Farrell	July 10, 2008
2	"Malone's Cones"	Brent Forrester	Ryan Koh	July 17, 2008
3	"Exposed Wires"	Brent Forrester	Ryan Koh	July 24, 2008
4	"Taste the Ice Cream"	Brent Forrester	Anthony Farrell	July 31, 2008

=== The Outburst (2008) ===
NBC ordered a new set of webisodes for the winter of 2008. The webisode series began its run on November 20, 2008. The webisodes feature all of The Office characters except for Michael, Pam, Jim, Dwight and Ryan. Oscar has an outburst in the middle of the office and his coworkers start an investigation.

No.	Title	Directed by	Written by	Original release date
1	"The Call"	Lee Eisenberg & Gene Stupnitsky	Nate Federman & Jonathan Hughes	November 20, 2008
Oscar angrily yells at an unknown person over the phone at work. Curious, Andy offers $100 to anyone who can find out who Oscar spoke to and what the conversation was about.
2	"The Investigation"	Lee Eisenberg & Gene Stupnitsky	Nate Federman & Jonathan Hughes	November 26, 2008
Oscar refuses to discuss the call with his co-workers.
3	"The Search"	Lee Eisenberg & Gene Stupnitsky	Nate Federman & Jonathan Hughes	December 4, 2008
When Oscar briefly steps away from his desk, Andy and Kevin search his computer before he returns and catches them.
4	"The Explanation"	Lee Eisenberg & Gene Stupnitsky	Nate Federman & Jonathan Hughes	December 11, 2008
Oscar attempts to file a complaint with HR against Andy and Kevin for violating his privacy, and Andy and Kevin decide to file a counter-complaint against Oscar for his outburst. Fed up, Oscar admits that he was yelling at the cable company following multiple delays in installing a new cable box in his home. The other workers are disappointed and judge Oscar for overreacting. Oscar receives another call from the company that someone is at his home for the installation, forcing him to leave work in the middle of the day to deal with it.

=== Blackmail (2009) ===
Creed decides to take up blackmail, and attempts to get money out of Oscar, Andy, Kelly, Angela, and Meredith.

No.	Title	Directed by	Written by	Original release date
1	"Oscar"	B. J. Novak	Nate Federman	May 7, 2009
2	"Andy"	B. J. Novak	Nate Federman	May 14, 2009
3	"Kelly"	B. J. Novak	Jonathan Hughes	May 21, 2009
4	"Pay Day"	B. J. Novak	Jonathan Hughes	May 28, 2009

=== Subtle Sexuality (2009) ===
Kelly and Erin form their own girl group, Subtle Sexuality, and get Ryan and Andy to assist them with their first music video, "Male Prima Donna".

No.	Title	Directed by	Written by	Original release date
1	"Creative Differences"	Mindy Kaling	Nate Federman & Jonathan Hughes	October 29, 2009
2	"The Replacement"	Mindy Kaling	Nate Federman & Jonathan Hughes	October 29, 2009
3	"The Music Video"	Mindy Kaling	Nate Federman & Jonathan Hughes	October 29, 2009

=== The Mentor (2010) ===
Erin wants to make a career change and finds herself a mentor: Angela.

No.	Title	Directed by	Written by	Original release date
1	"The Pupil"	Kelly Cantley	Nate Federman & Jonathan Hughes	March 4, 2010
2	"Reimbursements"	Kelly Cantley	Nate Federman & Jonathan Hughes	March 4, 2010
3	"Lunchtime"	Kelly Cantley	Nate Federman & Jonathan Hughes	March 4, 2010
4	"BFFs?"	Kelly Cantley	Nate Federman & Jonathan Hughes	March 4, 2010

=== The 3rd Floor (2010) ===
Ryan attempts to make a horror film titled The 3rd Floor using Dunder Mifflin as a location, and workers such as Kelly, Erin, Gabe, Kevin and Meredith as actors. The 3rd Floor was written by Jonathan Hughes, Kelly Hannon and Mary Wall and directed by Mindy Kaling.

No.	Title	Directed by	Written by	Original release date
1	"Moving On"	Mindy Kaling	Kelly Hannon & Jonathan Hughes & Mary Wall	October 28, 2010
2	"Lights. Camera. Action!"	Mindy Kaling	Kelly Hannon & Jonathan Hughes & Mary Wall	October 28, 2010
3	"The Final Product"	Mindy Kaling	Kelly Hannon & Jonathan Hughes & Mary Wall	October 28, 2010

=== The Podcast (2011) ===
Gabe attempts to record a podcast in the office about the Sabre website, hoping to impress corporate. The webisodes were made available on January 20, 2011, on NBC.com, but were previously included on the season 6 DVD release.

No.	Title	Directed by	Written by	Original release date
1	"Gabe's Podcast"	Charlie Grandy	Kelly Hannon	January 20, 2011
2	"The First Entry"	Charlie Grandy	Mary Wall	January 20, 2011
3	"The Debut"	Charlie Grandy	Jonathan Hughes	January 20, 2011

=== The Girl Next Door (2011) ===
The series focuses on Kelly and Erin's girl group called Subtle Sexuality. The first webisode documents the behind-the-scenes aspects of their second single "The Girl Next Door", while the second and final webisode is the music video itself, which features Ryan. The webisodes were made available on May 4, 2011, on NBC.com.

No.	Title	Directed by	Written by	Original release date
1	"The Story of Subtle Sexuality"	Mindy Kaling	Kelly Hannon & Jonathan Hughes & Mary Wall	May 4, 2011
2	"The Girl Next Door"	Mindy Kaling	Kelly Hannon & Jonathan Hughes & Mary Wall	May 4, 2011
