= Body Language (The Office) =

- The Office episode
- Episode no.: Season 6 Episode 23
- Directed by: Mindy Kaling
- Written by: Justin Spitzer
- Cinematography by: Randall Einhorn
- Editing by: David Rogers
- Production code: 623
- Original air date: April 29, 2010

Guest appearances
- Amy Pietz as Donna Newton; Zach Woods as Gabe Lewis

Episode chronology
← Previous "Secretary's Day"	Next → "The Cover-Up"
- The Office (American season 6)

"Body Language" is the twenty-third episode of the sixth season of the American comedy series The Office and the show's 123rd episode overall. It aired on April 29, 2010 on NBC.

In the episode, Pam and Jim work on their first sales pitch together to Donna, the manager of a local restaurant, but Michael keeps misreading the signals she's putting out. Dwight encourages Kelly to try out for the minority training program, but is forced to work against her after finding out her future plans after she is accepted into the program.

"Body Language" has received positive reviews from critics and was viewed by 7.09 million viewers.

== Synopsis ==
Pam Halpert and Jim Halpert work on their first sales pitch together to Donna, the manager of a local restaurant. Michael Scott employs several tactical dating and psychology moves to flirt with her, including juxtaposing pictures of himself with attractive people. He also gives Donna a Victoria's Secret catalog and flashes subliminal messages of the word "SEX" in his presentation. Throughout the day, he makes numerous unsuccessful attempts to kiss her. Michael discusses these attempts with the office workers, who largely interpret Donna as uninterested. Only Pam argues that she may have some interest, pointing out that Donna had opportunities to leave earlier in the day. At the end of the sales pitch, Donna leaves hurriedly, but remains in her car. Michael finds one of Donna's accessories in the office, giving him a pretext to chase after her. Though even Pam argues against it, Michael takes the opportunity and shares two kisses with Donna in the parking lot. He returns to the office and brags to the office workers, who are skeptical of his story.

Dwight Schrute learns that Darryl Philbin is interested in applying for the Sabre minority executive training program "Print in All Colors". He encourages Kelly to apply for the position, preferring that a "malleable simpleton who can be bought for a few fashion magazines" fill the role rather than a competent worker. Later, Kelly mentions to Dwight that she and Ryan Howard are planning to make Ryan the Scranton office manager once Kelly has assumed a position of authority, thus confounding Dwight's plans. Dwight attempts to sabotage the arrangement using racial semantics, uncovering that Indians are, in fact, Caucasians by definition. However, Gabe tells him that Darryl has decided not to apply as it would leave him no time for his softball league, leaving Kelly as the only applicant. Dwight turns to Stanley and Oscar, but they are both too scared of Kelly to compete with her for the position. In a last desperate attempt, he interrupts Kelly's interview to present Hide from the warehouse as a new applicant. Outraged by Dwight's betrayal, she storms out of the room. Kelly ultimately is accepted into the program. Though Dwight congratulates her, she promises revenge on him for introducing Hide as an applicant.

== Production ==
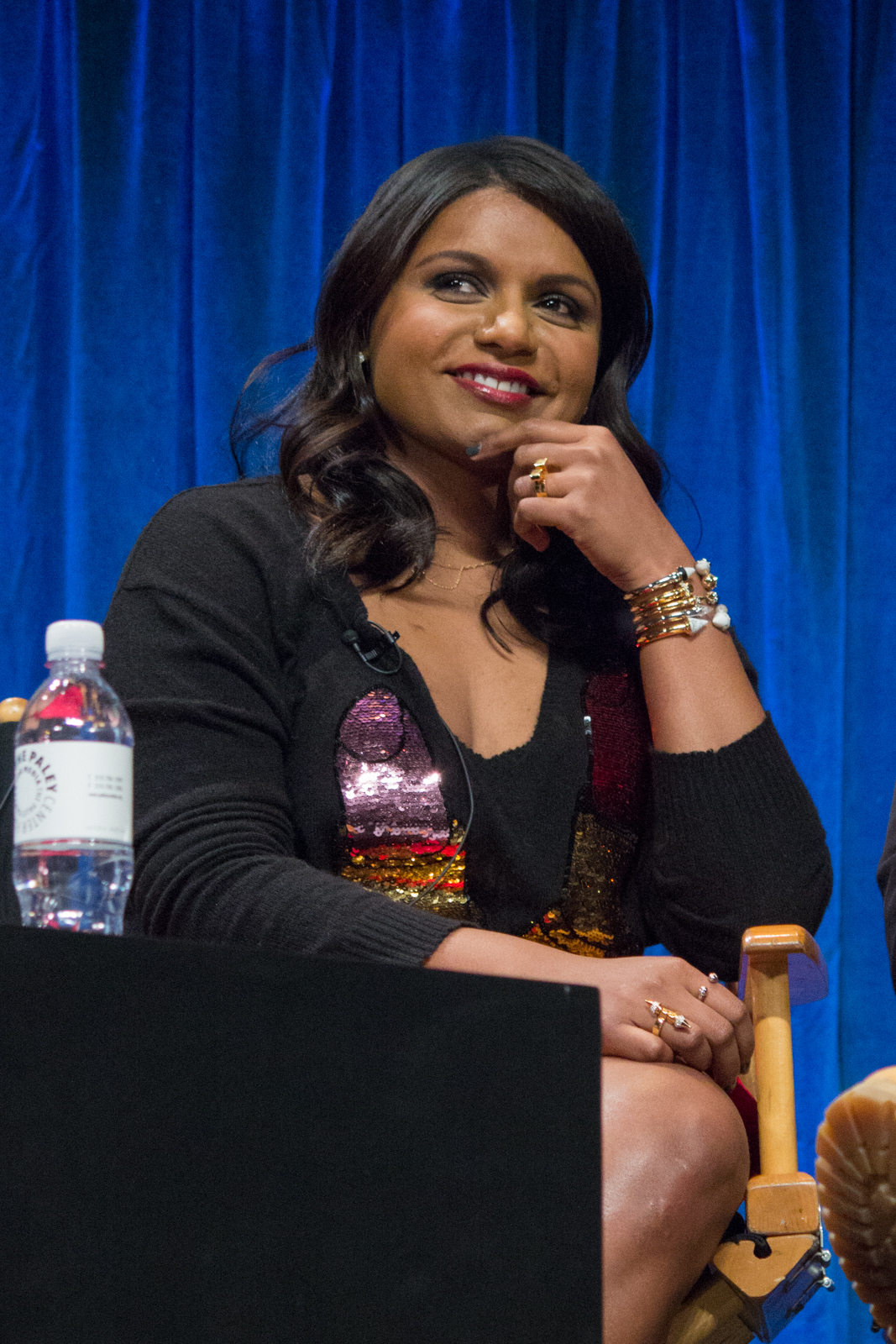
Mindy Kaling who plays Kelly Kapoor on The Office marked her television directorial debut with this episode.

It was written by Justin Spitzer, his second writing credit of the season after "Shareholder Meeting"; and it was directed by Mindy Kaling — which marks her television directorial debut, as she previously directed the "Subtle Sexuality" webisodes — who also portrays Kelly Kapoor on the series. The episode also features the second guest appearance of Amy Pietz as Donna (her first being in "Happy Hour") and Zach Woods as Gabe Lewis.

== Reception ==
In its original American broadcast, "Body Language" was watched by 7.09 million viewers, with a 3.6 rating and an 11 share in the 18–49 demographic. The episode also received a 4.2 in the 18–34 male demographic coming first in its timeslot for the demographic with the closest competition being Grey's Anatomy with a 1.7. The show ranked 10th in the 18–49 weekly ratings making it NBC's highest-rated show.

The episode received positive reviews from critics. Cindy White of IGN gave the episode an 8.8 saying, "While the episode probably won't stand out among the great Office episodes, it did everything you want an Office episode to do – make you laugh, sigh and cringe, sometimes all at once." Nathan Rabin of The A.V. Club gave the episode a A− writing "All in all, it was a fine episode. The only reason I’m not giving it an A is because it lacked the tragicomic heft of the best Office episodes." Joel Keller of TV Squad gave the episode a positive review as well saying "Despite the fact that we all knew that Michael and Donna were going to end up in a liplock, the journey there was still funny. I mean, who doesn't like seeing Kevin trying to push his manboobs together, or Andy talking about how the doctor who was feeling his punctured 'scrote' was just teasing doing so to up his bill? [sic]" Darren Franich of Entertainment Weekly gave the episode a positive review writing "straightforward and funny outing".

Not all the reviews were positive. Alan Sepinwall gave the episode a mixed review saying "wasn't nearly as bad as this season's 'Mafia' – nor was Michael as idiotic in this one as he was there — but it was still a fairly uncomfortable, airless outing, one where nearly all the laughs could be found in the Dwight/Daryl/Kelly subplot" and said that if Steve Carell leaves, the show could actually work.
