= Happy Hour (The Office) =

- The Office episode
- Episode no.: Season 6 Episode 21
- Directed by: Matt Sohn
- Written by: B. J. Novak
- Cinematography by: Randall Einhorn
- Editing by: David Rogers
- Production code: 621
- Original air date: March 25, 2010

Guest appearances
- Kelen Coleman as Isabel Poreba; Sam Daly as Matt; Hidetoshi Imura as Hidetoshi Hasagawa; Laurie Naughton Okin as Julie; Amy Pietz as Donna Newton; Bobby Ray Shafer as Bob Vance

Episode chronology
← Previous "New Leads"	Next → "Secretary's Day"
- The Office (American season 6)

"Happy Hour" is the twenty-first episode of the sixth season of the American comedy series The Office and the show's 121st episode overall. It originally aired March 25, 2010 on NBC.

In the episode, Oscar Martinez arranges a happy hour with the warehouse staff so he can flirt with Matt. Pam Halpert is excited to see the staff and brings a date for Michael Scott, but Michael turns into an alter ego named "Date Mike" who catches the eye of the bar manager. Meanwhile, Andy Bernard and Erin Hannon have begun a relationship but are keeping it a secret to avoid drama. Dwight Schrute rethinks his pre-natal contract with Angela Martin after he sees Isabel Poreba again.

"Happy Hour" was written by B. J. Novak and directed by Matt Sohn. "Happy Hour" got positive reviews, however, according to Nielsen ratings, the episode was viewed by 7.28 million viewers coming third in its timeslot and falling 3% from last week and becoming the lowest rated episode of the season.

== Synopsis ==
Wanting to spend more time with the new warehouse worker Matt, Oscar Martinez asks Darryl Philbin to organize a happy hour outing between the office employees and the warehouse workers. Jim and Pam Halpert, who is unusually excited to see everyone, invite a friend of hers, Julie, to meet Michael Scott. Julie takes a liking to Michael and laughs at everything he says, but when Michael learns they invited Julie specifically for him, he adopts a persona called "Date Mike" that he says is inspired by the winners and losers of reality TV dating shows and starts acting erratic and unpredictable. He causes a scene to the point where the manager, Donna, threatens to throw him out. Michael initially stands down, but then confronts Donna about what happened. The two hit it off and she offers him a free lunch at the bar. Julie notices this and leaves.

Andy Bernard and Erin Hannon do their best to keep their relationship under wraps because of the drama it might bring if they go public, even though everyone seems to know already. They first try to keep their distance from each other. They then flirt with other bar patrons, but when Erin takes the flirting too far, they have an argument in the photo booth. Realizing that hiding their relationship has caused too much drama, Andy announces their relationship on the PA system.

Dwight Schrute rethinks his prenatal contract with Angela Martin when Isabel arrives at the bar. Dwight and Isabel have fun playing Whac-A-Mole together. Dwight thinks that Isabel is better suited to have his children, so he tells Angela he is canceling the contract, prompting Angela to get a summons to court. When she confronts Dwight about the contract in front of Isabel, Isabel "whacks" Angela on the head and scares her off. Dwight gives Isabel a passionate kiss.

Kevin makes baby-crying noises near Pam, hoping the sound will cause her breasts to leak milk. It does not work, but later when Kelly Kapoor comes past weeping, it suddenly does.

Oscar is upset that Matt did not show up with the rest of them. Darryl tells Oscar that they have nothing in common, but when Matt finally shows up, Oscar gets excited and the two shoot hoops together. Darryl has the Japanese warehouse worker, Hide, recount how he used to be a heart surgeon. Hide failed a heart operation on a Yakuza boss, prompting him to flee to the United States, where Darryl gave him a job. Hide says he failed the heart operation purposely, claiming that he is "good surgeon".

== Production ==
The episode was written by B. J. Novak, his first writing credit for the season and directed by Matt Sohn, his first directing credit of the season.

Novak came up with the "Date Mike" persona to explain why Michael, despite being charming, handsome, reasonably successful, and interested in getting married and having children, remains single at over 40 years old. Novak did not come up with the subplot with Kevin crying in an attempt to make Pam's breasts leak and said he did not know who added it to the script, though Angela Kinsey (who played Angela on the show) said it must have been inspired by how Rainn Wilson (who played Dwight) did the same thing to her while she was breastfeeding.

== Reception ==
In its original American broadcast, "Happy Hour" was watched by 7.28 million viewers, with a 3.5 rating and a 10 share in the 18–49 demographic. The episode received positive reviews. Dan Phillips of IGN gave the episode an 8 saying it was "impressive" and "In the end, there were enough laughs to be had from most of the main love connections and quick asides to call 'Happy Hour' a success – even if the jokes weren't all necessarily fresh." Darren Fanich of Entertainment Weekly gave the episode a positive review saying "Did you like 'Happy Hour,' viewers? It’s usually a bad sign when sitcoms hit the point where everybody falls in love with everyone else, but to me, every romance on The Office feels realistic and weird in its own specific way." Nathan Rabin of The A.V. Club gave the episode a B+ saying "Yes, tonight was just like Valentine’s Day only not terrible. Actually, it was nothing like Valentine’s Day except that it involved love and a large ensemble."

Joel Keller of the TV Squad gave the episode a positive review saying "But you know what I'm getting at. The tone, pacing, and comedy of this episode continues the recent trend of The Office getting back to what made people love it to begin with. And, yes, part of that means that Michael is going to make an ass of himself. But at least the season six version of Michael somehow gets a little bit of hope mixed in with his desperation stew." Alan Sepinwall of The Star-Ledger gave the episode a mixed review said "Overall, though, I'd say the good outweighed the bad in this one, but just barely". On the OfficeTally, the episode got an 8.43/10.
