= Secretary's Day (The Office) =

- The Office episode
- Episode no.: Season 6 Episode 22
- Directed by: Steve Carell
- Written by: Mindy Kaling
- Cinematography by: Randall Einhorn
- Editing by: Claire Scanlon
- Production code: 622
- Original air date: April 22, 2010

Guest appearance
- Zach Woods as Gabe Lewis

Episode chronology
← Previous "Happy Hour"	Next → "Body Language"
- The Office (American season 6)

"Secretary's Day" is the twenty-second episode of the sixth season of the American comedy series The Office and the show's 122nd episode overall. It aired on April 22, 2010, on NBC. It was written by Mindy Kaling, who portrays Kelly Kapoor on the series, and is also the second episode in the series directed by Steve Carell, who also portrays Michael Scott.

In the episode, Andy tries to make his girlfriend Erin's Secretary's Day a special day, but things do not turn out well when Erin learns of Andy's previous relationship with Angela. Meanwhile, Oscar's video goes viral because he compares Kevin's voice to the Cookie Monster's, causing Gabe to try to assert his authority in the office.

== Synopsis ==
It is Secretary's Day, and Andy Bernard tries to make Erin Hannon's day a memorable one. He convinces a reluctant Michael Scott to take her to lunch at a place of her choosing. Michael is highly uncomfortable, as he thinks Erin is boring. During lunch, Erin asks Michael to tell her about Andy before she joined the staff, and he mentions that Andy was previously engaged to fellow office worker Angela Martin, a fact which Andy had concealed from Erin, to Michael's surprise. Upon learning about the engagement, Erin tries to conceal a fit by wrapping her hair around her face, and is silent on the drive back to the office. During the main party, when Andy starts to play a song he wrote for Erin, she throws cake in his face and reveals her knowledge of his engagement to Angela. Though Pam Halpert tries to persuade her that Andy's engagement to Angela is unimportant, revealing that she also was engaged to another co-worker before marrying Jim Halpert, Erin decides she can't trust Andy anymore and breaks up with him. At the end of the day, Michael cheers her up with some jokes and Andy notes that at least someone has made her happy on Secretary's Day.

Oscar Martinez makes a hilarious video, which dubs Kevin's voice over footage of Cookie Monster. Oscar's video goes viral and is a hit with the staff, and they continuously make fun of Kevin with Cookie Monster impersonations. Kevin complains to Gabe Lewis about their teasing. In an effort to assert his fledgling authority, Gabe bans the office from talking about the video or Cookie Monster. When the jokes continue, Gabe suspends Pam without pay for contradicting his orders, then Jim for defending her, and then even Dwight Schrute for applauding Gabe's punishments. Pam consults Toby Flenderson about this, and after looking into it he informs her that Gabe can ask people to not come in but does not have the authority to dock their pay. Meanwhile, Gabe learns from corporate that he cannot reprimand or suspend people. But rather than admit his mistake to Pam, Jim, and Dwight, he decides to salvage his pride by saying he will revoke the suspension if they apologize. Pam and Jim decline, thus effectively getting a two-day paid vacation, while Dwight apologizes and kisses Gabe's hand instead, as Jim and Pam neglected to share Toby's information with him. After Jim and Pam leave, Gabe decides to save face and mock Kevin as well, but does a poor impression. Kevin retaliates by doing an impression of Gabe, and the rest of the office joins his mockery.

At the end of the episode, Kevin tries to get revenge by dubbing Oscar's voice over footage of Count von Count, his rationale being that the Count counts and Oscar is an accountant. To his frustration, Kevin gets lots of bad reviews from everyone, many of whom agreeing it would have been funnier to dub Oscar's voice over footage of Oscar the Grouch. The Crew doesn't find it hilarious, only Michael finds it funny, but Kevin is satisfied with this, not even minding when Michael calls him "Cookie Monster".

== Reception ==
In its original American broadcast, "Secretary's Day" was watched by 6.30 million viewers, with a 3.2 rating and a 9 share in the 18–49 demographic.
