= The Target (The Office) =

- The Office episode
- Episode no.: Season 9 Episode 8
- Directed by: Brent Forrester
- Written by: Graham Wagner
- Cinematography by: Matt Sohn
- Editing by: David Rogers
- Production code: 9009
- Original air date: November 29, 2012
- Running time: 22 minutes

Guest appearances
- Chris Gethard as Trevor Bortmen

Episode chronology
← Previous "The Whale"	Next → "Dwight Christmas"
- The Office (American season 9)

"The Target" is the eighth episode of the ninth season of the American comedy television series The Office and the 184th episode overall. The episode originally aired on NBC on November 29, 2012. It features guest star Chris Gethard as Trevor.

The series depicts the everyday lives of office employees in the Scranton, Pennsylvania branch of the fictional Dunder Mifflin Paper Company. In the episode, Angela Lipton (Angela Kinsey) goes to Dwight Schrute (Rainn Wilson) for help when she learns that her husband is having an affair with Oscar (Oscar Nunez). Stanley Hudson (Leslie David Baker) and Phyllis Vance (Phyllis Smith) take advantage of Jim Halpert (John Krasinski) when he needs a favor, and Pete (Jake Lacy) distracts Pam Halpert (Jenna Fischer) as she begins painting her mural.

"The Target" received positive reviews from critics, with many commenting on Nunez and Kinsey's performances. The episode was viewed by 3.88 million viewers and received 1.9/5 rating among adults between the ages of 18 and 49, ranking fourth in its timeslot. The episode, however, ultimately ranked as the highest-rated NBC series of the night.

== Synopsis ==
Oscar Martinez believes that Angela Lipton does not know about his affair with her husband, but in fact she is playing dumb in order to keep Oscar off his guard while ponders getting revenge. She goes to Dwight Schrute for help, without telling him the details, and he calls a fellow former volunteer sheriff's deputy named Trevor for assistance. After Trevor shows his credentials, Angela says she wants the target murdered, which Dwight protests is too extreme, so they compromise to breaking the target's kneecaps. Dwight realizes the target is Oscar when Angela angrily crushes a cookie given to her by Oscar and then overhears Oscar in a phone call with Angela’s husband. Dwight tries to get Angela to reconsider, but Trevor has already arrived to carry out the job. Dwight rushes to get Oscar out, but they run into Trevor outside. A struggle between the three men ensues, with Oscar ultimately managing to take away Trevor's lead pipe. Trevor runs away, and Oscar and Dwight are confronted by Angela, who blames Oscar for turning her husband gay. Oscar tells Angela that she can hate him, but says that her husband was always gay, and refuses to hand the lead pipe over to Angela. She kicks him in the shin instead, and is comforted by Dwight. Upset that they do not understand homosexuality, Dwight and Angela go to Toby Flenderson with outlandish questions over homosexual activity, much to his dismay.

Jim Halpert asks Dunder Mifflin CEO David Wallace if he can work part-time so he can go to Philadelphia to help with his sports marketing job. David Wallace says that he might be needed in the office if there is a crisis with one of his clients, to which he responds that Stanley Hudson and Phyllis Vance have agreed to cover for him, though he in fact has not asked them yet. Stanley and Phyllis respond with their usual disinterest in helping others, so Jim offers to treat them to lunch. Stanley and Phyllis order extra side dishes and help themselves to an excess of wine, annoying Jim with drunken behavior and silencing him whenever he brings up the subject of their covering for him. When they arrive back at the office, a drunk Stanley and Phyllis are seemingly passed out in the backseat of Jim's car. When Jim puts his coat on them to keep them warm, Phyllis and Stanley say they will cover for him as they care for Jim and his family, laughing as they reveal they were only pretending to balk to get a free lunch. Jim gives both of them a hug.

Pam Halpert decides to start painting her mural in the warehouse, but has a hard time getting started as she is afraid of it not being perfect. Meanwhile, bored with having to fill out customer complaint cards (which he finds redundant because the complaints are already in the computer), Pete Miller uses them to build a card tower in the annex with other employees. The card tower takes on a deeper meaning for the employees when Pete points out that it is composed of failures made by every one of them (excepting only Pam), and thus proves that they should not be ashamed of their failures. Erin glares at him with more and more interest as time progresses. They decide to try to make it go all the way to the ceiling, but end up one complaint card short. Not wanting to use a blank card as it would defy the point of the tower, Pam offers to complete the tower by getting her first customer complaint. She calls one of their smaller clients, delivers a yo mama joke, and hangs up. The client, whose mother was actually obese and is now deceased, drops Dunder Mifflin as their paper supplier, leaving them simultaneously excited over getting that last complaint and disappointed over losing a client. After celebrating the completion of the card tower, Pam finally starts painting the mural, saying artists should not care too much in what others think, further asserting this by telling off Hide when he insults her artwork.

== Production ==
"The Target" was written by producer Graham Wagner, marking his debut writing credit for the series after joining the writing staff in the ninth season. It was directed by executive producer Brent Forrester, his fourth directing credit for the series and first since the eighth season episode, "Test the Store". Ed Helms and Clark Duke did not appear in the episode. This is due to the fact that they were both written out of several episodes of the season in order to film The Hangover Part III and Kick-Ass 2, respectively.

The official website of The Office included several cut scenes from "The Target" within a week of the episode's release. In the first 58-second clip, Pam feels further pressure over her mural and reveals that several of the warehouse workers think her name is Pat. In the second 60-second clip, The Senator comes by the office, Jim pretends to beg to Stanley and Phyllis while they are sleeping, and Pam talks more about her mural. In the third 66-second clip, Angela checks out Trevor's qualifications.

== Cultural references ==
Dwight assures Angela that she is not stupid, rather "Jazz is stupid." Angela concurs, saying: "Just play the right notes!" "The Target" features several meta-references and references to previous episodes. Dwight tells Angela and Trevor that "this documentary crew has been following our every move for the past nine years but I don't see them so I think we're good", when they are in Trevor's van. Angela and Dwight question Toby about the tendencies of homosexuals in a way similar to how Dwight questions Toby about the appearance of female genitalia in the second-season episode "Sexual Harassment". While working on her mural, Pam is seen wearing a Pratt Institute sweater, which she attended for three months during the fifth season. Angela tells Dwight to meet up in the "usual place", which Dwight shows up to nude, referencing their previous secretive relationship.

== Broadcast and reception ==
=== Ratings ===
"The Target" originally aired on NBC on November 29, 2012. In its original American broadcast, the episode was viewed by 3.88 million viewers and received a 1.9 rating/5% share among adults between the ages of 18 and 49. This means that it was seen by 1.9 percent of all 18- to 49-year-olds, and 5 percent of all 18- to 49-year-olds watching television at the time of the broadcast. This made "The Target" the lowest rated episode of the series, tying with "Here Comes Treble". The episode also ranks as the least-viewed episode of the series and the first one to fall below the 4-million viewer mark. Despite this, The Office was the highest-rated NBC television program. When DVR ratings were taken into account, the episode was viewed by 6.047 million viewers, a 56 percent increase.

=== Reviews ===
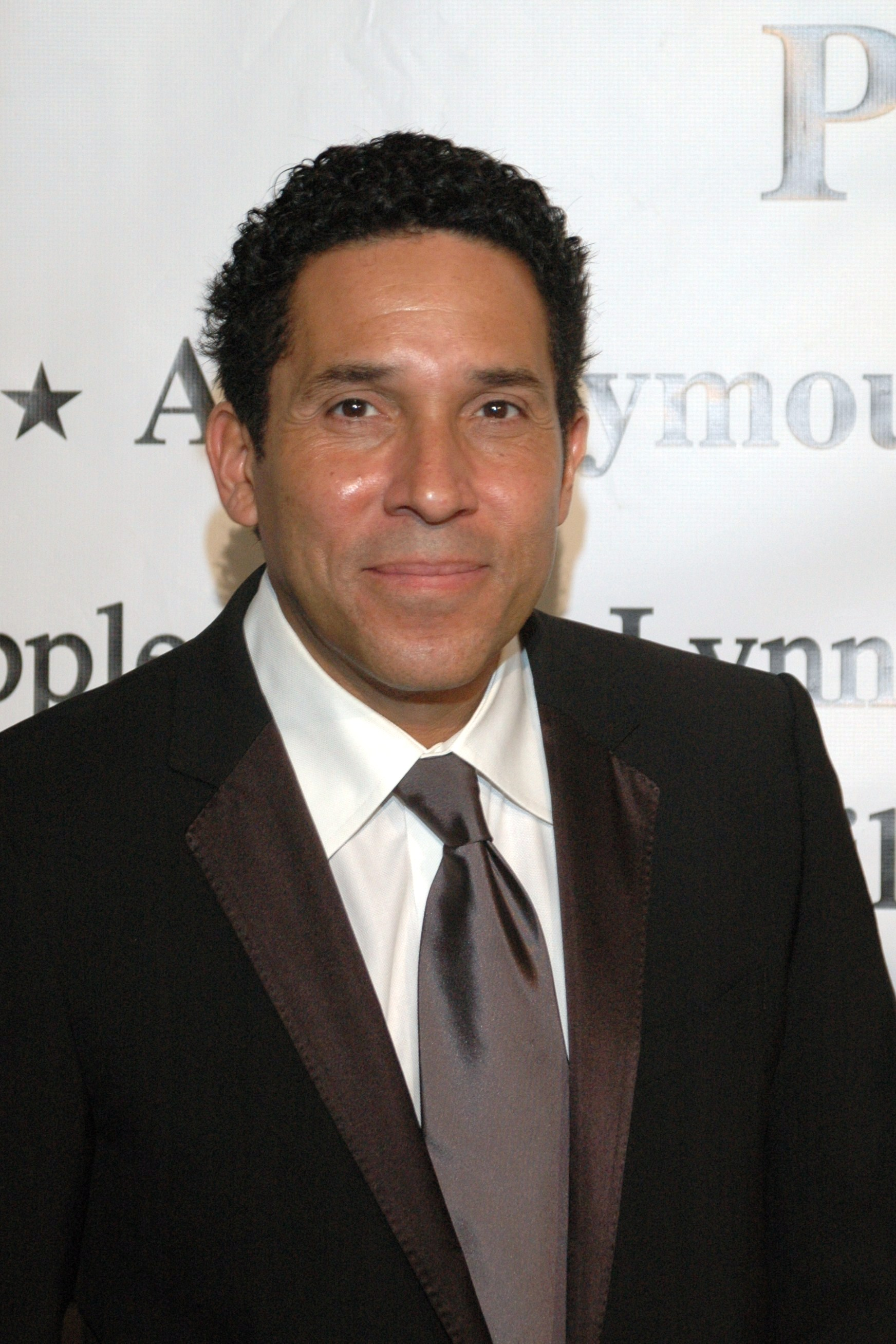
Many critics were pleased with Oscar Nunez (pictured) and Angela Kinsey's performance in the episode.

"The Target" received mostly positive reviews from critics, with many praising the performances of Oscar Nunez and Angela Kinsey. The A.V. Club reviewer Erik Adams wrote that the episode was a perfect mix, between the more subtle, realistic style of the early seasons, and the more-farcical style of the most recent seasons. He named the Oscar-Angela plotline a "season highlight", and complimented Angela Kinsey's commitment to Angela throughout the plotline. He also praised the other storylines of the episode for showing the family-like bond between the whole ensemble. He ultimately gave the episode an "A−". Cindy White of IGN commented that the episode proved the series did not need a character in the role of the boss. She complimented the confrontation between Oscar and Angela and the Pam subplot for marking some "development" in her character, but criticized the Jim-Stanley-Phyllis subplot for being "over the top". She ultimately gave the episode an 8.0/10. Paste writer Bonnie Stiernberg called the episode "strong", and compared it to the older episodes. She praised the Oscar-Angela plotline, calling it Oscar Nunez and Kinsey's best performance of the year. She also complimented the Jim-Stanley-Phyllis subplot, calling the ending to it sweet, and the Pam-Pete-Erin subplot, calling it "more complex-but no less enjoyable" and praised the development of Pam's character, considering it to be "touching". Stiernberg ultimately gave the episode an 8.6/10.

Michael Tedder of New York praised the writers’ work and for giving "nice character moments" to the cast, particularly Kinsey. He also praised them for giving Kinsey "more to work with", comparing her role in previous episodes which featured her character being "exaggerated to cartoon levels for the sake of a laugh". ScreenCrush reviewer Damon Houx was slightly more critical with his review, writing that while the cast was quite good, the episode was too struggled with "find[ing] stuff for everyone to do", and that the Pete-Erin-Pam and Jim-Stanley-Phyllis subplots "ultimately have nowhere interesting to go". Multiple critics noted similarities between the style of this episode with the early seasons of the series, particularly for its use of callbacks.
