= The Third Floor =

- The Third Floor, Inc.: a visual effects company.
- The 3rd Floor: a 3-part webisode of the US version of "The Office"
