= New Leads =

- The Office episode
- Episode no.: Season 6 Episode 20
- Directed by: Brent Forrester
- Written by: Brent Forrester
- Cinematography by: Randall Einhorn
- Editing by: Claire Scanlon
- Production code: 620
- Original air date: March 18, 2010

Guest appearance
- Zach Woods as Gabe Lewis

Episode chronology
← Previous "St. Patrick's Day"	Next → "Happy Hour"
- The Office (American season 6)

"New Leads" is the twentieth episode of the sixth season of the American comedy series The Office and the show's 120th episode overall. The episode aired on NBC on March 18, 2010. It was written and directed by Brent Forrester.

In this episode, Sabre has spent a large amount of money for some sales leads, due to their new "sales is king" policy. Frustrated with his sales staff's cocky attitudes, Michael is reluctant to hand out the new leads he has received, and instead hands them out to the non-sales staff, who are also frustrated with their coworkers' behavior, and the leads are hidden.

== Synopsis ==
The sales staff (Jim Halpert, Dwight Schrute, Phyllis Vance, Andy Bernard and Stanley Hudson) let Sabre's new "sales is king" policy get to their heads, frustrating Michael Scott and the rest of the non-sales staff. The sales staff are expected to receive new leads from the corporate office and when they arrive, Michael refuses to give them to the sales staff due to their arrogant and disrespectful behavior (particularly Phyllis ordering Michael to "hand them over, numb-nuts"), which earns him the respect of the non-sales staff. After talking on the phone with Gabe Lewis about their attitude, Michael is ordered to hand out the leads and cheerfully does just that—to the non-sales staff: Creed Bratton, Meredith Palmer, Angela Martin, Kevin Malone, Ryan Howard, Kelly Kapoor, Oscar Martinez, and Erin Hannon. They all hide them throughout the office, and Jim is given a list of clues as to where to find them and calls Pam Halpert, who is at home on maternity leave, to try to figure them out. Erin plays the warmer-colder game with Andy, who thinks she is trying to have him touch her chest, only to find leads under the keyboard. Angela forces Phyllis to do unnecessary paperwork, which she will later destroy. Stanley wins leads from Ryan and Kelly by pretending to agree with various points they're making during an argument.

When Dwight returns from a sales call, he is given a clue that leads him to Kevin, who tells him that some of the leads are in the trash after Dwight starts strangling him. However, the trash is empty, so Dwight checks the dumpster, which is also empty. Michael sees that the garbage truck had emptied the dumpster already, so he and Dwight go to the dump to find them.

Jim's urging gets the sales staff to acknowledge their rude behavior, and they agree on a plan to offer the non-sales staff some pastries and 2% of their commissions. However, before mentioning their commissions offer, the rest of the staff are so happy with the snacks that they end their dispute with the sales force, who decide to cap the apology right there. At the dump trying to find the leads, Michael calls Dwight out on his bad attitude and Dwight complains that he "hitched my wagon to a horse with no legs" by accepting Michael's job offer years ago instead of going to Home Depot, and the two start throwing trash at each other until they get exhausted. They make amends and return to the office, no longer concerned about the lost leads but rather the cool beanbag chair they found.

At the end of the episode, Andy and Erin try to look for the leads at the dump after work. Andy gets cold so Erin gives him her jacket. He tells her that she is the nicest person he has ever met and they share a first kiss amidst the mountains of trash.

== Reception ==
In its original American broadcast, "New Leads" was watched by 7.63 million viewers, with a 3.6 rating and a 10 share in the 18–49 demographic.
