= James S. Forrester =

James S. Forrester may refer to:

- James Forrester (politician) (James Summers Forrester, 1937–2011), member of the North Carolina General Assembly
- James S. Forrester (cardiologist) (born 1937), American cardiologist
