= St. Patrick's Day (The Office) =

- The Office episode
- Episode no.: Season 6 Episode 19
- Directed by: Randall Einhorn
- Written by: Jonathan Hughes
- Cinematography by: Matt Sohn
- Editing by: David Rogers
- Production code: 617
- Original air date: March 11, 2010

Guest appearances
- Kathy Bates as Jo Bennett; David Koechner as Todd Packer; Sam Daly as Matt; Zach Woods as Gabe Lewis

Episode chronology
← Previous "The Delivery"	Next → "New Leads"
- The Office (American season 6)

"St. Patrick's Day" is the nineteenth episode of the sixth season of the American comedy series The Office and the show's 119th episode overall. The episode aired on NBC on March 11, 2010. It was written by Jonathan Hughes and directed by Randall Einhorn.

In this episode, Jo Bennett and Michael clash during Jo's last day at the Scranton branch, when Jo makes the whole office stay late at work, which angers the branch especially since it is St. Patrick's Day. Meanwhile, Dwight has converted his, Jim's, and Pam's desks into one "megadesk", which frustrates Jim when he returns from paternity leave. Meanwhile, Andy and Erin's first date is interrupted when Erin goes home sick, so Andy pretends to be sick as well to go to her house.

== Synopsis ==
Jo Bennett is spending her last day at the Scranton office, and Michael Scott thinks he has earned her favor after some small talk. When Jo opens up the floor to suggestions on how to improve business, Darryl Philbin offers an idea on how to improve shipping for both paper and printers. As a result, Jo allows Darryl to take Jim's old office. Michael tries to earn Jo's favor by scheduling a vacation to her home state of Florida, but Jo berates him for wasting time. The rest of the office is unhappy when Jo forces them to stay late, as she has an unpredictable work schedule. Michael is particularly upset, as he made plans to meet Todd Packer at a bar for St. Patrick's Day. The employees try to make breaks for it, but fail. Michael is finally direct with Jo, and tells her he is allowing his employees to leave. She complies, showing the first hint of respect for Michael. Michael and Todd Packer meet the rest of the employees at the bar.

Andy Bernard and Erin Hannon are set to have their first date. However, Erin is sick and Jo sends her home. Andy, wanting to see Erin, feigns being sick so he can leave too. He visits Erin at home, and they watch TV together. However, their time is interrupted when he meets her foster brother, who makes Andy sit on the chair while he sits next to Erin on the couch. Erin and her foster brother engage in physically intimate behavior, so Andy begins to suspect that the foster siblings are romantically involved. When he prepares to leave, however, Erin gives Andy a lingering kiss on the cheek.

While Jim and Pam Halpert are gone on parental leave, Dwight Schrute arranges Jim's and Pam's desks with his into one "Megadesk". When he returns from leave, Jim puts the desks back properly, but Dwight continually reforms his "Megadesk" whenever Jim is not around. In a bid to preserve "Megadesk", he tells Jim about how he and his cousin Mose never saw their fathers when they were young. He then plays "Cat's in the Cradle" loudly on the computer while Jim is on a sales call. Jim (surprised that Dwight's cheap manipulations are working) wishes he was at home with his newborn daughter.

Dwight attempts to get out of work by telling Jo he has a meeting with a client, but Jim beats him to it. This allows Jim to leave, forcing Dwight to go back to his desk. Dwight comes in to work the next day to find that Jim had rearranged the desks into a "Quad-Desk": one desk on top of the other two desks, with a little space in between the two bottom desks where he put Dwight's computer, phone and nameplate.

== Reception ==
In its original American broadcast, "St. Patrick's Day" was watched by 7.51 million viewers, with a 3.8 rating and an 11 share in the 18–49 demographic.
