= Lemon of Troy =

- The Simpsons episode
- Episode no.: Season 6 Episode 24
- Directed by: Jim Reardon
- Written by: Brent Forrester
- Production code: 2F22
- Original air date: May 14, 1995

Episode features
- Chalkboard gag: "The First Amendment does not cover burping"
- Couch gag: The Simpsons are animated in the style of Fleischer Studios.
- Commentary: Matt Groening; David Mirkin; Jim Reardon; Greg Daniels; David S. Cohen; David Silverman

Episode chronology
← Previous "The Springfield Connection"	Next → "Who Shot Mr. Burns? (Part One)"
- The Simpsons season 6

"Lemon of Troy" is the twenty-fourth and penultimate episode of the sixth season of the American animated television series The Simpsons. It originally aired on Fox in the United States on May 14, 1995. In the episode, the children of Springfield try to retrieve their beloved lemon tree after it is stolen by the children of Shelbyville.

The episode was written by Brent Forrester and directed by Jim Reardon. For this episode, the animators designed a non-polluted version of Springfield. It features cultural references to Prince's song "When Doves Cry", the 1981 film Mad Max 2, and the 1968 song "What a Wonderful World". The episode's title is a play on the name of Helen of Troy from Greek mythology. The episode acquired a Nielsen rating of 8.1. The episode has garnered universal acclaim and is regarded as a classic episode of the show.

== Plot ==
Marge lectures Bart on the importance of town pride after he writes his name in wet cement. Soon he realizes the joys of living in Springfield and is upset by anti-Springfield taunts coming from neighboring Shelbyville. Grampa explains this rivalry can be traced to the establishment of the two towns: Jebediah Springfield wanted a town which promoted chastity and abstinence, but Shelbyville Manhattan, founder of Shelbyville, was a proponent of cousin marriage.

The next day, Springfield's lemon tree is stolen by a gang of boys from Shelbyville. Bart leads Milhouse, Nelson, Martin, Todd and Database to Shelbyville to find the tree and return it to Springfield. Bart's posse locates the tree in an impound lot where the leader of the gang that stole the tree lives.

Using Ned Flanders' RV, Homer leads the boys' fathers to their sons in Shelbyville. The fathers and sons demand their tree be returned, but the owner of the impound lot taunts them and refuses to surrender it. Using a Trojan Horse strategy, Bart parks the RV outside a hospital, where it is impounded to the lot. When night falls, the Springfield men and boys emerge from the RV and tie the lemon tree to its top. The lot owner catches them but they manage to escape and return the tree to Springfield.

In the aftermath, the town elders of Springfield and Shelbyville provide their own endings to the tale. In Springfield, Grampa lauds the triumphant return of the tree by the "heroes of Springfield"; Bart and Milhouse celebrate with a glass of lemonade made from a few drops of lemon juice (and a large amount of sugar). In Shelbyville, an old man makes up a story about the tree being haunted to cover the embarrassment of losing to their rivals in Springfield. The Shelbyville kids drink turnip juice instead, much to their disgust.

== Production ==
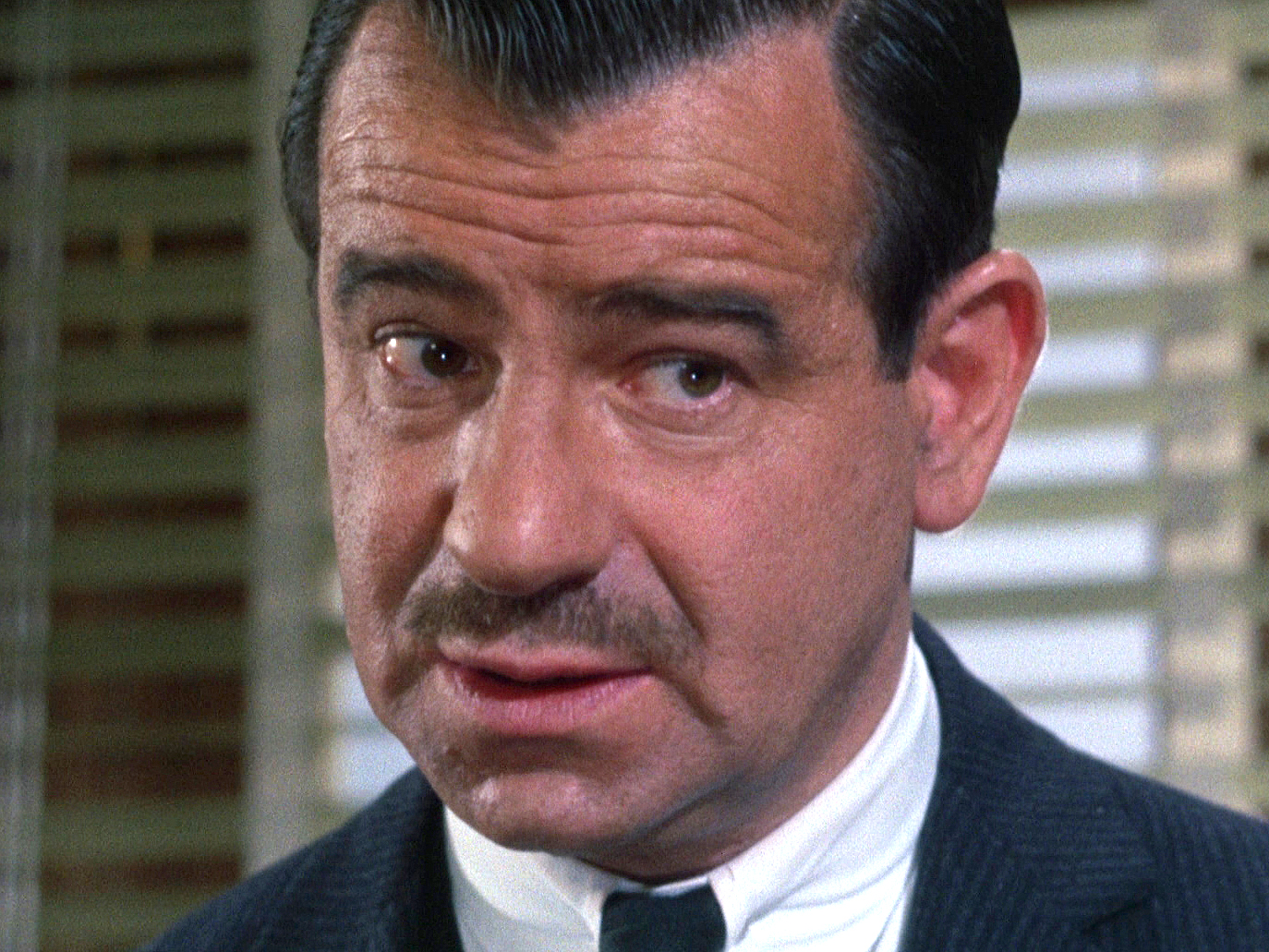
The voice of Shelby's father is based on Walter Matthau.

Brent Forrester wrote "Lemon of Troy", his second episode of The Simpsons. Jim Reardon directed it. Early on in the production stage, the writers decided that the leader of the Shelbyville children, Shelby, and his father should be modeled after Bart and Homer. Shelby's voice was provided by Tress MacNeille, and Shelby's father was voiced by Hank Azaria, who based his performance on Walter Matthau, as Dan Castellaneta originally based his performance of Homer on Matthau.

The writers wanted to have the Springfield children find an area of Springfield that was not decimated, and the animators designed a version of Springfield that was very idyllic. They drew several scenes of the children running through non-polluted streams and woodlands. The animators gave Shelbyville's nature a more dark feeling in comparison to Springfield.

== Cultural references ==
Upon meeting someone with his name, Milhouse paraphrases Prince's song "When Doves Cry" (1984). Shelby's dad can be heard singing Louis Armstrong's "What a Wonderful World" (1967). In a scene referencing "The Lady, or the Tiger?", Bart identifies the number seven in Roman numerals by referring to Rocky film titles, combining Rocky V with Rocky II to form the nonexistent Rocky VII: Adrian's Revenge. (Note: The actual seventh film in the Rocky franchise is Creed (2015).) The scene with Bart and his team sitting on a hill above the enemy camp and looking down at the captured tree being circled by children on bicycles bears a resemblance to an early scene in Mad Max 2.

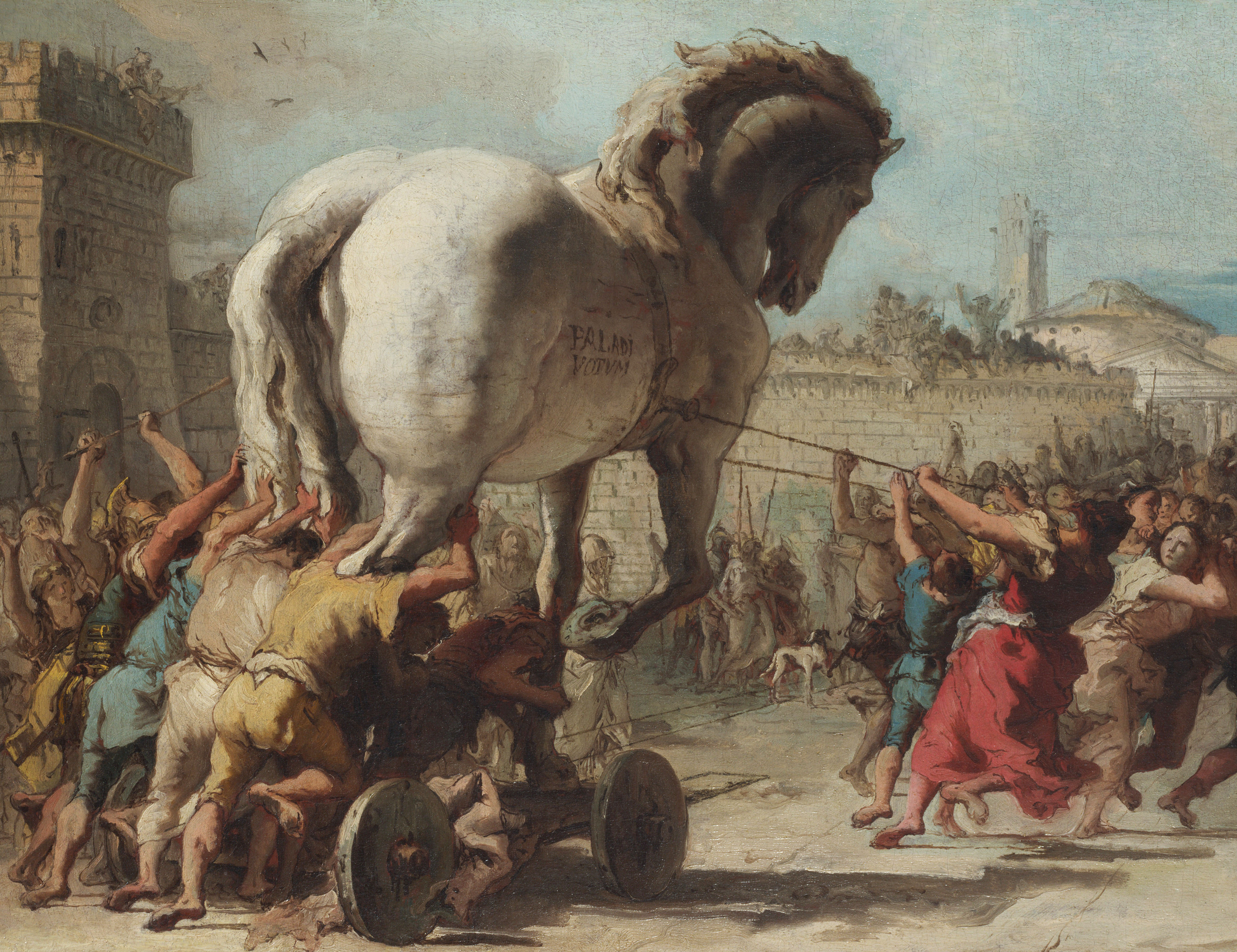
The method of recovery of the lemon tree is a reference to the legend of the Trojan Horse.

The overall plot structure of Springfield residents attacking their neighboring rivals after they steal their prize possession is a reference to the legend of the Trojan War, in which the incentive for the Greeks declaring war on their Trojan neighbors is the abduction of their most famous and beautiful female citizen, Helen; the title of the episode is a play on her name. The method of recovery of the tree is an echo of the Trojan Horse. Homer complains that "Nobody cared when Bogart defaced that sidewalk in Hollywood", referring to when Humphrey Bogart was honored in a ceremony at Grauman's Chinese Theatre to record his hand and footprints in cement in 1946. The scene where Milhouse envisions himself using his camouflage clothing to taunt the Shelbyville kids, leaving only his smile and glasses visible, references the Cheshire Cat from Alice In Wonderland.

== Reception ==
In its original broadcast, "Lemon of Troy" finished 55th in the ratings for the week of May 11 to May 17, 1995, with a Nielsen rating of 8.1. The episode was the sixth-highest-rated show on the Fox network that week.

Since airing, it has received universal acclaim from fans and television critics. Matt Groening, creator of The Simpsons, called the episode a "classic" and said it is one of his favorites from the show. Gary Russell and Gareth Roberts, the authors of the book I Can't Believe It's a Bigger and Better Updated Unofficial Simpsons Guide, said there was "some nice ideas in this episode—Bart and his chums all have near-doubles in Shelbyville—but this is a strangely pedestrian outing, and seems hidden away—wisely—at this point in the season." In a DVD review of the sixth season, DVD Verdict's Ryan Keefer said the episode "easily [is] one of the best of the season" and that it has "gotten more enjoyable since it first aired". He added that the episode is "full of everything that makes the show successful" and gave it an A rating. Entertainment.ie named it among the 10 greatest Simpsons episodes of all time. Nashville Scene named it the "perfect episode".

In The A.V. Club, David Sims writes that "The 'rival opposite town' is a TV trope that feels very standard at this point, so it's hard to remember that The Simpsons pretty much invented it. Obviously rival towns had existed before, in literature as well as TV, but Shelbyville is the beginning of an unforgettable comedy concept. ... Homer's rivalry with his counterpart (who is possibly even dumber than he is, although maybe it's just the overalls) is a perfectly done 30-second scene. The closing maneuver is where the episode takes its name from: a Trojan Horse trick that sees Flanders' RV towed into the lemon tree lot with all of the crafty Springfielders inside. Again, even though there's no real danger at any point, the stakes feel high and the sense of triumph as the gang makes it home is tremendous. This is that rare episode that just gives Homer and Bart a totally deserved win. Shelbyville sucks, Springfield rules, and we should all be cheering about it."
