= The Seminar =

- The Office episode
- Episode no.: Season 7 Episode 14
- Directed by: B. J. Novak
- Written by: Steve Hely
- Cinematography by: Matt Sohn
- Editing by: Claire Scanlon
- Production code: 714
- Original air date: January 27, 2011

Guest appearances
- Ricky Gervais as David Brent; Hugh Dane as Hank Tate

Episode chronology
← Previous "Ultimatum"	Next → "The Search"
- The Office (American season 7)

"The Seminar" is the fourteenth episode of the seventh season of the American comedy television series The Office, and the show's 140th episode overall. Written by Steve Hely and directed by B. J. Novak, the episode aired January 27, 2011 on NBC. The episode features Ricky Gervais reprising his role as David Brent, his character from the original British version of The Office, in an uncredited cameo.

In the episode, Andy holds a small business seminar in the office. He asks Kevin, Creed and Kelly to help him while Michael and Holly embrace the opportunity to improv. Meanwhile, Oscar and Pam help Erin in a Scrabble battle against Gabe.

== Synopsis ==
Michael Scott bumps into David Brent outside an elevator. After they exchange several ethnic jokes, David asks if Dunder Mifflin is hiring. Michael says "not right now" and David asks him to drop a line if they do have any openings.

In order to improve his worst-in-office sales totals, Andy Bernard holds a seminar on starting a small business. He enlists Jim Halpert as one of the guest speakers, but Jim abruptly pulls out when he recognizes Tom Witochkin, one of the attendants. The other speakers—Dwight Schrute, Phyllis Vance, and Stanley Hudson–lose faith in Andy's plan and also pull out, leaving Andy to replace them with Kevin Malone, Creed Bratton and Ryan Howard. Kevin's speech goes bad when he gets ill from running around the room, and vomits in front of the audience. Kelly Kapoor, who replaces Ryan, calls up an old professor from her management training time at Yale to talk business lessons. Creed delivers a bizarre speech about the Loch Ness Monster.

Erin Hannon is battling Gabe Lewis in a game of Scrabble played over their phones. The winner of their Scrabble games always picks the movie they watch, and since Erin is poor at the game, Gabe has already subjected her to numerous horror movies. With the help of Oscar Martinez and Pam Halpert, she almost beats Gabe but loses on the last turn, because she does not realize Oscar is trying to feed her a winning word ("apoplexy") and instead puts in "ape".

After Jim spends all day outside of the office, Pam forces him to tell the camera crew why he is avoiding Tom. Jim explains that he and Tom were childhood friends who were placed in separate reading groups in school. After his mom told him to spend time with the kids in his higher-level reading group, Jim told Tom that "my mom thinks you're too dumb to hang out with." Jim bumps into Tom in the break room, and tries to laugh off their history, but Tom mocks Jim for not being as successful as his superior intellect would have indicated.

During a break in Andy's seminar, Dwight talks to one of the attendees, a man who owns a golf supply business, and realizes this could actually be a good opportunity for the sales team. He, along with Phyllis and Stanley, try to rejoin Andy, who refuses at Darryl's advice. At the end of the seminar, Andy sells three packages, thanks to the advice of Michael, who has taken a Greek persona of "Mykonos" in order to impress Holly Flax, who has broken up with A.J. With Holly playing his wife "Necropolis", Michael professes his love to her (in character). She becomes uncomfortable at this and walks away, but Michael is hopeful.

At the end of the day, Gabe shows Erin the movie they will be watching that night, Hardware, which involves a killer robot (calling it a compromise because Erin wanted to watch WALL-E). As he is leaving, Andy casually loans Erin a copy of Shrek 2, saying he thinks she would like it. A deflated Gabe realizes that Erin is far more excited about the movie Andy recommended her than the one he picked out.

== Production ==
The episode was written by producer Steve Hely, the first episode he has written for The Office since joining the writing staff in season seven. It was directed by co-executive producer B. J. Novak, the second episode he has directed for the series; he also portrays Ryan Howard on the show. The episode features the first guest appearance of The Office co-creator Ricky Gervais which was revealed on January 19, 2011, that Gervais would reprise his role as David Brent from the original British series in a cameo appearance. The scene was shot months previously, and NBC hoped to keep it a secret, but the news eventually leaked. Gervais appeared in the cold open in the episode, interacting with Michael Scott. He eventually reappeared in the seventh season finale, "Search Committee".

The official website for The Office included four cut scenes from "The Seminar" within a week of its release. In the first 41-second clip, Stanley reveals his selling technique while Andy reveals why he cannot close sales. In the second 56-second clip, Michael gives more answers to Holly on his Greek character. In the third 39-second clip, Creed reveals that the idea of Chuck E. Cheese's was supposedly taken from him. In the fourth 108-second clip, Dwight, Stanley and Phyllis try to convince Michael to make Andy let them close the seminar.

== Reception ==
=== Ratings ===
In its original American broadcast on January 27, 2011, "The Seminar" was viewed by an estimated 7.93 million viewers and received a 4.0 rating/11% share among adults between the ages of 18 and 49 according to the Nielsen Media Research. This means that it was seen by 4.0% of all 18- to 49-year-olds, and 11% of all 18- to 49-year-olds watching television at the time of the broadcast. It marked an eleven percent decrease from the previous episode, Ultimatum. The episode ranked first in its timeslot beating the Fox series Bones which received a 3.9 rating/10% share in the 18–49 demographic, a rerun of the CBS crime drama CSI: Crime Scene Investigation which received a 2.1 rating/6% share, a rerun of the ABC medical drama, Grey's Anatomy which received 1.5 rating/4% share and Nikita which received a 1.1 rating/3% share.

=== Reviews ===
The episode received mostly positive reviews from critics. HitFix writer Alan Sepinwall said the episode was "uneven but often funny, and a nice showcase for the supporting cast." James Poniewozik of Time praised the cold opening with Ricky Gervais, writing, "In barely over a minute, it showed us the commonalities between the two characters: how they've each created a world in which they are 'performers' whose cutting-edge comedy is often unappreciated". Despite this, "The Seminar" was voted the second lowest-rated episode out of 24 from the seventh season, according to an episode poll at the fansite OfficeTally.
