= Employee Transfer =

- The Office episode
- Darryl Philbin (right) gets a headache while driving Holly Flax (left) and Michael Scott (center).
- Episode no.: Season 5 Episode 6
- Directed by: David Rogers
- Written by: Anthony Q. Farrell
- Cinematography by: Randall Einhorn
- Editing by: Dean Holland; David Rogers
- Production code: 506
- Original air date: October 30, 2008

Guest appearances
- Amy Ryan as Holly Flax; Tug Coker as Pete Halpert; Blake Robbins as Tom Halpert

Episode chronology
← Previous "Crime Aid"	Next → "Customer Survey"
- The Office (American season 5)

"Employee Transfer" is the sixth episode of the fifth season of the American version of the television series The Office and the show's seventy-eighth episode overall. It was broadcast in the United States on October 30, 2008, on NBC.

In this episode, Michael struggles with the fact that his girlfriend Holly is being transferred back to her old branch in Nashua, New Hampshire, after CFO David Wallace discovers their relationship. Meanwhile, Pam and Jim's two brothers play a prank on Jim, and Dwight irritates his romantic rival Andy by taking an interest in Andy's old school, Cornell University.

== Synopsis ==
Holly Flax is transferred back to her old branch in Nashua, New Hampshire after CFO David Wallace discovered her relationship with Michael Scott. Michael and Darryl Philbin help her move using Darryl's truck. Michael and Holly want to continue their relationship, but as they get closer to Nashua, Holly believes it is not going to work with the long distance. Michael begs her to keep their relationship alive as he fears he will go back to Jan Levinson. Michael had intended to spend the weekend with Holly, but after they move her stuff into her new house, he changes his mind. Michael and Holly share a last embrace before he leaves with Darryl. In the truck, Darryl tries to console Michael by teaching him to sing the blues. Michael does not understand, but is cheered up nonetheless.

Jim Halpert meets Pam Beesly in New York for lunch with his brothers, Tom and Pete. Pam, Tom, and Pete arrive early to discuss a prank Pam wants to play on Jim that involves her engagement ring. Tom and Pete, however, think of playing a prank which detriments her interest in art. When Jim arrives, Tom and Pete mock Pam's interest in art, and Jim continuously comes to her defense. When the argument becomes heated, Tom and Pete reveal it was a prank, and Jim and Pam stare awkwardly at each other. Later, when Jim and Pam are walking outside of the restaurant, Pam explains her original prank idea, which Jim appreciates more than his brothers' idea. Jim receives a text message from his brothers stating their approval of Pam and welcoming her to the family.

In Scranton, Dwight Schrute comes in wearing a Cornell sweatshirt in order to mock Andy Bernard, jealous of his engagement to Angela Martin. Dwight tells him that he is applying to Cornell, and installs a Cornell pennant and a Cornell mascot bobblehead in his area. In retaliation, Andy calls the university and is given permission to give Dwight his interview for admission. Andy has no intention of allowing Dwight to pass, and Dwight notices inconsistencies with Andy's questions (such as asking who was Cornell's 8th president, which Dwight answers correctly as Dale R. Corson, but Andy replies with Cornell's 7th president James A. Perkins). He writes down critiques of Andy's interviewing skills, which he tells him he is going to send to Cornell. Dwight and Andy record numerous insults, culminating with Dwight saying he will apply to the "vastly superior Dartmouth" and a heated physical struggle with the conference room table. The next day, Andy comes into the office in overalls, a farmer's hat, and a basket of beets, saying he is starting his own beet farm, in an attempt to mock Dwight. Dwight, however, is quick to point out Andy's lack of knowledge of beets.

== Production ==
The episode was written by Anthony Q. Farrell and directed by Dave Rogers, who was making his directorial debut. Filming was accomplished on a more erratic schedule than was typical for The Office, since on the back half of a Wednesday the show's crew had to shoot the proposal scene for the episode "Weight Loss".

In the script, the characters were to be in costume for the entire episode, with Dwight wearing the Cornell shirt on top of his costume, but it was decided that this distracted from the plot, so the costumes were limited to the cold open. Creed, Dwight and Kevin all dress in the style of Heath Ledger's performance as The Joker in the 2008 film, The Dark Knight. Creed Bratton (the actor) said of his costume, "I worked pretty hard to get him down. A lot of people said it was really eerie and kind of uncomfortable." Rogers commented, "Creed really got into the part. He really enjoyed being the Joker."

In one scene, Michael and Holly are watching a movie during the ride and laughing uproariously, until Darryl makes a sharp turn which causes the portable DVD player to fly out the open window. Despite three hours of filming, the crew were only able to get one decent take of this scene, since in every other take the DVD player failed to go out the window, and consequently the scene was excluded from the final cut. Filming of the Michael and Holly scenes in general took longer than anticipated, and the team had to film the last scene, with Darryl teaching Michael the blues, when the sun had nearly set.

Pam suggesting that she and Jim prank Tom at Thanksgiving about being bald, while making air quotes at "prank", was an ad lib by actress Jenna Fischer.

== Reception ==
Holly's transfer to Nashua ranked number 4 in phillyBurbs.com's top ten moments from the fifth season of The Office. However, "Employee Transfer" was voted the fourth lowest-rated episode out of 26 from the fifth season, according to an episode poll at the fansite OfficeTally; the episode was rated 7.20 out of 10.

Reviews were mixed. Though CinemaBlend called the episode "weird" and the opening Halloween party "hilarious", it discussed at some length Holly and Michael's road trip with Darryl, which became a "painful breakup process" for the couple, with "poor Darryl" forced to listen to Michael begging not to break up. IGN gave the episode a grade of 8.4 ("Great"), and described Steve Carell as adding "another dimension" to his character. Noting "a bunch of great moments" during the truck road trip, IGN singled out Darryl trying to teach Michael how to sing the blues as he "both laughs and cries" as taking "the prize" and "a pitch perfect moment and a beautiful scene". Adam Sweeney of Film School Rejects wrote, "The strength of the episode came, not surprisingly, in the road trip Michael, Holly, and Darryl (Craig Robinson) took to move Holly following her transfer. There is nothing more entertaining than a man that is desperate not to lose his girlfriend." But Sweeney concluded that it "may have been the weakest episode of season five". In a later review in TheTVCritic.org, Robin Pierson wrote "Michael and Holly’s break-up is all too real and brings forth some excellent acting from both. Michael breaking down and crying and admitting that he will go back to Jan and that he hates her is particularly effective. Without any context his whiny voice might seem like overacting but it feels like the embodiment of Michael Scott and is very moving to hear."
