= Casual Friday (The Office) =

- The Office episode
- Episode no.: Season 5 Episode 26
- Directed by: Brent Forrester
- Written by: Anthony Q. Farrell
- Cinematography by: Matt Sohn
- Editing by: Claire Scanlon
- Production code: 526
- Original air date: April 30, 2009

Guest appearance
- Ellie Kemper as Erin Hannon

Episode chronology
← Previous "Broke"	Next → "Cafe Disco"
- The Office (American season 5)

"Casual Friday" is the twenty-sixth episode of the fifth season of the television series The Office and the 98th overall episode of the series. It originally aired on NBC in the United States on April 30, 2009. In this episode, Michael, Pam and Ryan return to Dunder Mifflin as salespeople, and other members of the sales staff become upset when they do not get their old clients back that the Michael Scott Paper Company stole from them. Meanwhile, Jim tries to remain neutral about the situation and plays board games with Creed, and Casual Friday is reinstated in the office, with mixed results.

The episode was written by Anthony Q. Farrell and directed by Brent Forrester. The episode received generally positive reviews, with several commentators expressing relief that the series appeared to remain fresh following the six-episode "Michael Scott Paper Company" story arc, which had ended in the previous episode, "Broke". According to Nielsen ratings, "Casual Friday" was watched by 7.3 million viewers during its original broadcast, marking the lowest original episode rating of the fifth season until the May 14 season finale, "Company Picnic".

== Synopsis ==
Michael Scott has returned to his old job as regional manager of the Dunder Mifflin Scranton branch and announces that Pam Beesly and Ryan Howard have joined the sales team, retaining their old clients from the Michael Scott Paper Company. Dwight Schrute, Andy Bernard, Phyllis Vance and Stanley Hudson are upset because most of those clients were previously theirs, and because Michael treats Pam and Ryan with more respect because they were the only people to follow him to his new company. Dwight calls a secret meeting in the warehouse with the salespeople, minus Pam and Ryan, to think of a way to get their clients back.

Jim Halpert, trying to remain impartial, informs Michael of the potential mutiny and heads to the break room to play board games with Creed Bratton until the conflict is resolved. In response, Michael, Pam and Ryan eat the rest of the sales staff's lunches after they explain their disappearance by stating they went out to lunch together. Dwight interrupts a sales call Ryan is having with one of Dwight's former clients, causing him to lose the client. Dwight yells at both Ryan and Pam over the lost account and he, Andy, Phyllis and Stanley threaten to quit and start their own paper company unless they get their clients back. Michael calls their bluff and demands an apology for having not followed him when he quit. Phyllis breaks down and says that they were the real victims of Michael's company, not corporate, which she considers hypocritical since Michael said they were family. Michael is taken aback by her words.

It is Casual Friday and most people dress too loosely at the office. Angela complains to Toby Flenderson about Oscar Martinez wearing sandals. Meredith Palmer disgusts the rest of the employees by wearing a very short dress without any panties or a bra, thus exposing herself to the rest of the office as she tries to adjust it to meet Toby's requests. Toby calls a meeting with everyone regarding Casual Friday. When Dwight tries to take charge of the meeting, Toby is finally stern with him and cancels Casual Friday, much to everyone's disappointment.

Michael gives Dwight, Andy, Phyllis and Stanley a formal apology, but they do not accept it since all they want is their clients back. Michael reluctantly agrees to give back their clients. In doing so, however, there are not enough clients to keep both Pam and Ryan on the sales team, leaving Michael to decide which one to keep. He talks it over with Jim, who suggests Pam would be better suited, but Michael argues that Jim is biased since Pam is his fiancée. Michael calls a meeting with Pam and tells her she did not get the sales job. Pam is disappointed, but Michael starts laughing and tells her that she did get it, having offered Ryan a temp position again. Pam tells him he should stop with the "fake-firing" joke, but Michael pulls the joke on the new receptionist, Erin Hannon.

== Production ==
"Casual Friday" was written by Anthony Q. Farrell and directed by Brent Forrester. The official website for The Office included two cut scenes from "Casual Friday" within a week of its original release. In the first 50-second clip, Jim welcomes Pam to her new sales desk with a gift of a model of an island with figures representing Jim, Pam and Dwight, who share the office pod together. Dwight insists he did not have anything to do with the gift and does not welcome Pam to the desk because she "obscures my view of the shredder." In the second 50-second clip, Dwight tells Andy, Stanley and Phyllis that they should "put our balls in the guillotine, as they say," by threatening to quit if Michael does not give their clients back. The others express doubt and wonder if they should keep quiet in order to protect their jobs.

Originally, Michael was supposed to spill the chili, but it was changed to Kevin to give him a moment in the episode. The crew did it in a single take but the set took several hours to clean afterwards.

== Cultural references ==
Ryan makes reference to Michael Chiklis in The Shield; Michael is not familiar with the show, but recognizes the actor from The Commish. Erin says that Kelly looks like J-Lo in her outfit, a reference to the actress and singer Jennifer Lopez. Kevin is shown to drive a Honda CR-V.

"Casual Friday" included several callbacks to previous episodes. The scene in which Michael pretends to fire Pam, and she tells him, "Maybe you shouldn't fake fire people anymore," is a reference to the first episode of The Office, in which Michael pretends to fire Pam as a prank and she becomes very upset, which he then does exactly to Erin. Michael compares the difficult choice of choosing between renting the movies The Devil Wears Prada and Sophie's Choice, both of which star Meryl Streep. The reference to the former film is a callback to the cold open to fourth season episode, "Money", in which Michael discusses having watched the movie recently and acts rudely toward Pam in the same fashion as Miranda Priestly, the film's antagonist, who is played by Streep. When Dwight is writing the secret messages, he uses Ryan's coffee mug that Kelly gave to him from the "Customer Survey" episode, to hold the urine.

== Reception ==
In its original American broadcast on April 30, 2009, "Casual Friday" was watched by 7.3 million viewers, according to Nielsen ratings. It was the lowest original episode rating of the fifth season at the time of its broadcast, although the season finale "Company Picnic", would later receive a lower rating on May 14, being watched by 6.72 million viewers. "Casual Friday" received a 4.2 rating/12 share among viewers aged between 18 and 34, and a 3.7 rating/10 share among viewers between 18 and 49. The episode received generally positive reviews. Most reviewers particularly praised the opening scene with Kevin dropping his pot of chili; Fickett called it "a great silent comedy moment [and] a quintessential Office moment".

Alan Sepinwall of The Star-Ledger praised the episode, saying that it proves the show will still be good following the "Michael Scott Paper Company" arc, which he referred to as one of the best storylines in the show's history. Sepinwall said he thought all the supporting characters were excellent, and that he particularly liked the new adversarial dynamic between Michael and Dwight. Margaret Lyons of Entertainment Weekly said, "This was the episode I've been waiting for weeks." She said she particularly enjoyed many of the subplots involving Kelly's clothing, Creed's chess game with Jim, and Toby dealing with casual Friday problems. Nathan Rabin of The A.V. Club gave "Casual Friday" a B+ grade, and said the episode had good character moments and a bit of dramatic depth in addition to a few good laughs.

Travis Fickett in IGN said Creed, Kevin, Meredith and Toby were all in top form in "Casual Friday", and said he enjoyed the changes that resulted in Michael's departure from and return to the company. However, Fickett questioned what direction the show would go now that so many questions have been resolved. Jay Black of TV Squad said the conflict between Michael and his co-workers was very good, and he enjoys the way Phyllis revealed how hurt she was by Michael's departure from the company; however, Black said he did not like that the episode included a "Casual Friday" even though the office had never had one before. Rick Porter of Zap2it said the supporting characters were all in top form and that the episode demonstrated how Michael, in offering a genuine apology, has grown this season. Porter also praised the scenes with Jim and Creed, and described Kate Flannery as "one of the most fearless actresses on TV" for her scene with the short bathing suit. Josh McAuliffe of The Times-Tribune called the episode "yet another winner in what's shaping up to be a terrific last third of the season".

"Casual Friday" was voted the sixteenth highest-rated episode out of 26 from the fifth season, according to an episode poll at the fansite OfficeTally; the episode was rated 7.95 out of 10.
