= Mafia (The Office) =

- The Office episode
- Episode no.: Season 6 Episode 6
- Directed by: David Rogers
- Written by: Brent Forrester
- Cinematography by: Matt Sohn
- Editing by: David Rogers
- Production code: 606
- Original air date: October 15, 2009

Guest appearance
- Mike Starr as Angelo Grotti

Episode chronology
← Previous "Niagara"	Next → "The Lover"
- The Office (American season 6)

"Mafia" is the sixth episode of the sixth season of the American comedy series The Office and the show's 106th episode overall. It originally aired on October 15, 2009 on NBC.

In this episode, Michael Scott (Steve Carell) becomes convinced that an insurance salesman visiting the office is a part of the Mafia, and Dwight Schrute (Rainn Wilson) and Andy Bernard (Ed Helms) accompany Michael to a meeting with him. Meanwhile, Kevin Malone (Brian Baumgartner) accidentally cancels Jim's credit card, while Jim (John Krasinski) and Pam Halpert (Jenna Fischer) are on their honeymoon in Puerto Rico.

It was written by Brent Forrester and directed by David Rogers. "Mafia" received positive reviews from critics and was viewed by an estimated 8.03 million viewers and received a 4.1/10 in the 18–49 demographic. It is the only episode in the series to not physically feature Jim or Pam.

== Synopsis ==
Michael Scott meets with a tenacious but not overly skilled insurance salesman named Angelo Grotti in the office and is later convinced by Dwight Schrute and Andy Bernard that he is part of the Mafia and also by the fact that Grotti's surname sounds very similar to John Gotti. Oscar Martinez tries to convince them otherwise to no avail, and later notes that since Jim and Pam Halpert are on their honeymoon in Puerto Rico, and Toby Flenderson has "checked out", the "coalition for reason" in the office is very weak. Oscar calls them about the situation but Pam pointedly reminds him that they are on their honeymoon and should not be bothered unless it's a dire emergency.

Michael calls for a lunch meeting with Grotti, convinced by Dwight and Andy to meet him in a public place where Grotti cannot become violent. Dwight and Andy accompany him to the meeting, Andy disguised as a mechanic and bearing a tire iron so he can defend Michael; though this backfires on him when he was forced to try and fix a woman's car and ends up breaking it further. Michael interprets Grotti's insurance pitches as veiled threats, and frightened, signs a deal with him. However, Michael cannot afford the policy, so he calls Jim for help. Jim briefly pranks him by pretending to cut out before telling him to not call him on his honeymoon again. Michael also consults Oscar, who tells him to simply cancel the insurance, but Michael is too intimidated to do so and becomes despondent.

Discontent at seeing Michael with his spirit broken and facing financial ruin, Dwight and Andy resolve that they have to get him to stand up to Grotti. They tell Michael that Grotti was just pretending to be part of the Mafia to con Michael into a deal. Enraged, Michael calls Grotti, chews him out for his "threats", and tells him to cancel the deal. After he hangs up, Dwight and Andy admit their deception and congratulate Michael on standing up to the Mafia. Michael is too elated by his accomplishment to be mad at Dwight and Andy for lying to him, and eagerly recounts his conversation with Grotti to the rest of the office.

Kevin Malone uses Jim's office to pass gas in and eventually sets up a temporary workspace in there. Jim's credit card company calls his office phone inquiring about some unusual charges and Kevin, worried someone might have stolen Jim's card, uses one of Jim's pay stubs to give them his address and social security number. They say that there have been charges that occurred in Puerto Rico and that they will cancel his card. Kevin realizes his mistake and tries to stop them, but to no avail, and Oscar tells Kevin he just committed identity fraud. At the end of the episode, Kevin calls Pam to confirm that they do not suspect that he is behind Jim's credit card being cancelled; after Pam angrily cuts off the call, Kevin cheerfully notes "they have no idea what happened".

== Production ==
The episode was written by Brent Forrester, his first writing credit for the season and seventh writing credit for the series. The episode was directed by David Rogers, his first directing credit for the season and second for the series. The episode originally aired October 15, 2009 on NBC as the sixth episode of the sixth season and the 106th episode of the series in all.

The episode also guest stars Mike Starr as Grotti, the Insurance salesman. The plot of the episode was revealed by executive producer of The Office, Paul Lieberstein, at the Television Critics Association press tour.

== Reception ==
In its original American broadcast, "Mafia" was viewed by 8.03 million viewers, with a 4.1 rating and a 10 share in the 18–49 demographic coming second in its timeslot after Grey's Anatomy going down seven-tenths from last week's episode, "Niagara" according to the Nielsen Media Research.

Dan Phillips of IGN gave the episode an 8.8 saying it was "great" and "Mafia" isn't one of the show's greatest episodes, but it is a highly enjoyable one. By the time Dwight and Andy convinced Michael to finally stand up to the pushy salesman, I realized I had been giggling practically nonstop since the episode started. It's one of those episodes that's just too silly not to love." Leonard Pierce of The A.V. Club gave the episode a B saying "Overall, this was a strong if not essential episode – it didn't move any major story arcs along at all, but it was solidly funny, and proved that the show can survive taking both Jim and Pam out of the picture for a full episode". Joel Keller criticized the main plot saying "It was more than a post wedding let down; it was one of the worst episodes in years". The episode currently ranks 23rd on the OfficeTally's ranking list of Season 6 episodes.
