= PDA (The Office) =

- The Office episode
- Episode no.: Season 7 Episode 16
- Directed by: Greg Daniels
- Written by: Robert Padnick
- Cinematography by: Matt Sohn
- Editing by: David Rogers; Claire Scanlon
- Production code: 717
- Original air date: February 10, 2011

Guest appearance
- Hugh Dane as Hank Tate

Episode chronology
← Previous "The Search"	Next → "Threat Level Midnight"
- The Office (American season 7)

"PDA" is the sixteenth episode of the seventh season of the American comedy television series The Office and the show's 142nd episode overall. Written by Robert Padnick and directed by series creator Greg Daniels, the episode originally aired on February 10, 2011 on NBC. This episode received positive reviews and was nominated for the Writers Guild of America Award for Television: Episodic Comedy.

== Synopsis ==
It is Valentine's Day. Michael Scott and Holly Flax have started dating again, and their bizarre and often sensual public displays of affection (PDA) start to make everyone in the office uncomfortable. Gabe Lewis holds a meeting about PDA, saying that Sabre is tolerant of office relationships, but not PDA, pointing the finger at Michael and Holly (who are shocked that the PDA meeting is about them). They both agree to stop, but while Holly follows through, Michael cannot help himself. Michael then declares to the office that he genuinely loves Holly, who is at first taken aback, but then reciprocates. When Michael and Holly make a scene miming sexual actions without touching each other, Gabe reprimands them, suggesting that they are acting this way to have a full on relationship before Toby Flenderson returns from jury duty, which would send Holly back to Nashua. Michael then becomes worried that they will have to break up again, but Holly assures him that they can make it work. Michael points out that they broke up the last time because of that and cannot see Holly for the rest of the day. Michael then confronts Holly to tell her that he is breaking up with her. Holly, however, says that they should decide for themselves and not let the company decide their future. They both resolve to move in together and announce it to the office.

Jim and Pam Halpert have too much champagne during lunch, causing complications when they have to return to work. During the PDA meeting, Dwight Schrute lists people that have had sex in the workplace (most of the workers), and Jim and Pam are not mentioned. Due to their intoxication, they agree to give it a try, but they have a hard time finding a place to do it, from hidden places in the warehouse to Ryan Howard's closet. They eventually return to their desks. The two tell the interviewers that they left for a walk, but Pam smiles at the end of the interview.

Gabe arranges a romantic treasure hunt for Erin Hannon, but she is stumped at the first clue and asks Andy Bernard for help. Andy, who is dating a friend of Darryl Philbin's named Rachel, at first declines, but relents at Erin's friendly urging. The hunt starts with a puzzle picture, which leads to Gabe's stereo in Darryl's office, which leads to glow in the dark stars in Ryan's closet, leading to sparkling cider with Hank Tate the security guard, and finally to a Valentine's cookie in the break room. When the cookie tells her to enjoy her Valentine's kiss, Erin thinks she is supposed to kiss Andy. Andy points out Gabe blowing a kiss through the window and leaves awkwardly.

== Production ==
This episode was written by Robert Padnick, his first writing credit of the series. It was directed by Greg Daniels, developer of the U.S. version, his twelfth directing credit of the series. Beginning with this episode, writer and cast member B. J. Novak was promoted from a co-executive to an executive producer. Also, Warren Lieberstein and Halsted Sullivan were promoted from producers to supervising producers.

Darryl having a tear in his eye as Andy pummels him during the cold open was unscripted; the film crew came up with this addition on the set.

For the nighttime clue in Ryan's office, the prop team tried using real star stickers, but their shine did not show up well enough on film, so luminescent paint was used on the walls instead.

== Reception ==
In its original American broadcast on February 10, 2011, "PDA" was viewed by an estimated 6.90 million viewers and received a 3.5 rating/9% share among adults between the ages of 18 and 49. This means that it was seen by 3.5% of all 18- to 49-year-olds, and 9% of all 18- to 49-year-olds watching television at the time of the broadcast. This marked a slight drop in the ratings from the previous episode, "The Search".

For his work on this episode, Robert Padnick was nominated for a Writers Guild of America Award for Episodic Comedy.
