= The Search (The Office) =

- The Office episode
- Episode no.: Season 7 Episode 15
- Directed by: Michael Spiller
- Written by: Brent Forrester
- Cinematography by: Matt Sohn
- Editing by: David Rogers
- Production code: 715
- Original air date: February 3, 2011

Guest appearances
- Linda Purl as Helene Beesly (voice)

Episode chronology
← Previous "The Seminar"	Next → "PDA"
- The Office (American season 7)

"The Search" is the fifteenth episode of the seventh season of the American comedy television series The Office, and the show's 141st episode overall. Written by Brent Forrester and directed by Michael Spiller, the episode aired February 3, 2011 on NBC.

In the episode, Jim leaves Michael behind at a gas station to attend to CeCe. Michael then wanders around Scranton, leaving Dwight, Erin, and Holly to look for him. Meanwhile, Pam starts a caption contest in the office, with Gabe instituting rules that no one wants to follow.

== Synopsis ==
Michael Scott continues to ask Holly Flax to get back together with him, but she continually refuses. Since she dated Michael when she worked in Scranton before and A. J. when she moved to Nashua, she feels like she does not want to fall into a pattern of dating co-workers. Michael and Jim Halpert then go out on a sales call. After landing the sale, an irritable Michael needs to stop to use the bathroom.

While at a gas station, Jim gets a call from Pam Halpert's mother Helene, who was taking a feverish Cece to see the doctor when she accidentally locked the child in the car. Panicked, Jim attempts in vain to tell Michael through the door of the bathroom, then tells another gas station customer to tell Michael what happened and drives off, but the customer leaves after only waiting for a few seconds. Michael is left with no way of contacting the office, as his cell phone and wallet are with Jim and he does not remember the office's number, so he wanders around Scranton.

Jim, now with Cece, calls Pam and tells her Michael is at the gas station, so Holly, Erin Hannon, and Dwight Schrute head there. Finding Michael has left the gas station, Dwight suggests that Michael walked back towards the office, but Holly correctly guesses that he was enticed by the smell of the nearby bakery. After stopping at a grocery store to get some things for Pam, Dwight and Erin notice Holly at a cell phone kiosk outside, using a joke name to complete the forms in order to get a rubber stress ball. When the attendant mentions that someone else did the same thing earlier, Dwight and Erin recognize a fake name that is used by Michael. Noting Michael and Holly's similar interests and personalities, they conclude that Holly likely thinks the same way as Michael and can use this to find him. They follow her to a Chinese restaurant, where they find his picture on the wall along with others who have dined there without paying.

Dwight demands Holly tell him where Michael is, but when she suggests they find a high vantage point at which they can try to spot him, Dwight rejects this idea. While Dwight looks in a bowling alley, Holly heads up to the roof of a tall building to see if she can spot Michael from above. On the roof, she finds Michael who was similarly trying to spot the office from above. They both admit that they have missed each other and kiss.

Pam notices that several coworkers have written funny captions below her Sabre printer doodle on the refrigerator and gets the office to participate in a caption contest involving a cartoon of two dogs on a tropical island. Gabe Lewis is upset that the captions insult Sabre, and implements a set of rules, stating that they cannot insult Sabre or even use pop culture references. The office instead uses instant messenger to share quips in secret. Gabe catches them and prints out the quips, which insult Sabre and even attack Gabe personally, and reads them to the office thinking this will shame the authors. Instead, they all laugh at each other's quips.

== Production ==
This episode was written by consulting producer Brent Forrester, his first writing credit of the season and his ninth writing credit of the series. It was directed by Michael Spiller, his first directing credit for The Office. This was the third consecutive episode in which John Krasinski has a limited role in the episode as Jim, due to the filming of Big Miracle in Alaska.

== Reception ==
In its original American broadcast on February 3, 2011, "The Search" was viewed by an estimated 7.29 million viewers and received a 3.7 rating/9% share among adults between the ages of 18 and 49, decreasing in viewers from the previous episode.
