= Anthony Q. Farrell =

Canadian comedian, actor and writer

- Born: Anthony Farrell; May 13, 1977 (age 49); Toronto, Ontario, Canada
- Occupations: Actor, comedian, writer
- Years active: 2006–present
- Known for: The Office; Little Mosque on the Prairie; The Thundermans

Anthony Q. Farrell (born May 13, 1977) is a Canadian comedian, actor and writer. He has written for The Office, presided as executive story editor for Little Mosque on the Prairie as well as produced and performed in various stand-up and sketch comedies. He is also known for his work as a writer on the Nickelodeon sitcom The Thundermans.

Born and raised in Toronto, Ontario, Canada, he was consulted on Canadian mannerisms and props for the episode "Business Trip" which saw the characters on The Office travel to Winnipeg, Manitoba, Canada.

In 2015, one of Farrell's original sitcoms, entitled the Secret Life of Boys, was produced by the production arm of Zodiak Kids and aired on CBBC in the UK and ABC3 in Australia. The show follows an 11-year-old Australian girl who has to spend her summer holidays with her English cousins, a family with four teenage boys. In 2021, Farrell co-created a new sitcom called Overlord and the Underwoods with Cloudco Entertainment's Ryan Wiesbrock, which premiered on CBC Television in Canada in October 2021. He concurrently served as a writer, director and producer on the family sitcoms The Parker Andersons and Amelia Parker.

He was honoured as Showrunner of the Year at the Writers Guild of Canada Awards in 2022 after receiving the same title from Playback in late 2021.

He created the 2023 series Shelved for CTV.

== Writing credits ==
=== The Office written episodes ===
Farrell has written or co-written the following episodes:

- "Kevin's Loan" webisodes (10 July 2008)
- "Employee Transfer" (30 October 2008)
- "Casual Friday" (30 April 2009)
