= Brent Forrester =

American writer and producer

- Born: 1967 or 1968 (age 58–59); Los Angeles, California, U.S.
- Education: Columbia University
- Occupations: Writer; producer
- Years active: 1992–present
- Father: James S. Forrester

Brent Forrester (born 1967 or 1968) is an American writer and producer. He wrote several episodes of the animated television sitcom The Simpsons between 1993 and 1997. He has worked as a writer on The Ben Stiller Show, Mr. Show with Bob and David, Undeclared, Super Fun Night and The Office. He served as head writer and executive producer on King of the Hill, Love, The Office and Space Force. Forrester has also written feature films.

== Early life ==
Forrester was born in Los Angeles, the son of the cardiologist James S. Forrester, and grew up as a surfer in Malibu, California. He graduated from Columbia University in 1990, working at the university's student TV station, and returned to Los Angeles to begin a career as a TV writer. At Columbia, he roomed with Tim Kelly, the future mayor of Chattanooga, Tennessee.

== Career ==
Forrester won an Emmy Award in 1993 for his writing on The Ben Stiller Show. Forrester then wrote for The Simpsons between 1993 and 1997, penning "Homer vs. Patty and Selma", "Lemon of Troy", the Krusty Burger segment of "22 Short Films About Springfield", and "Homerpalooza". "Homerpalooza" was based on a story by David X. Cohen, although Forrester wrote the script. To do research for the episode, Forrester went to one of the Lollapalooza concerts, which ended up being a horrible experience. Several of the jokes in the episode are based on his experiences: cameras (including his own) were being seized and thrown in the garbage, there were numerous advertisements, several "sour faced teens", a real freak show and at one point a stranger approached Forrester and asked, "How's it going, narc?"

Forrester was an executive producer on King of the Hill, and wrote for Mr. Show with Bob and David and Undeclared. He served as a writer and consulting producer on The Office. He has written seven episodes of the show including "The Merger" and "Business School" and directed the episode "Casual Friday". He also directed a 2008 series of webisodes of the show, and wrote the NBC.com web series In Gayle We Trust.

He also wrote the screenplay for the 1996 film The Stupids. Forrester is writing the film The Low Self Esteem of Lizzie Gillespie with Mindy Kaling, and a sitcom pilot for Ron Howard. Forrester also voiced Leon the Drug Addict in the episode of King of the Hill "Junkie Business".

In May 2012, he became an executive producer for the final season of The Office. In 2014, Netflix announced a two-season comedy series entitled Love co-created by director Judd Apatow, Paul Rust, and Lesley Arfin, with Forrester as executive producer. From 2020 until 2022 Forrester was executive producer of Space Force which was created by Greg Daniels and Steve Carell.

== Writing credits ==
=== The Simpsons written episodes ===
Forrester has written (or co-written) the following episodes:

- "Homer vs. Patty and Selma" (February 26, 1995)
- "Lemon of Troy" (May 14, 1995)
- "22 Short Films About Springfield" [contributor] (April 14, 1996)
- "Homerpalooza" (May 19, 1996)

=== Mr. Show written episodes ===
Forrester has co-written (with Dino Stamatopoulos) the following sketches from the following episodes:

- "The Return of the Curse of the Creature's Ghost" (December 5, 1997) [sketch: "Pre-Taped Call-In Show"]
- "Rudy Will Await Your Foundation" (November 9, 1998) [sketch: "Audition"]

=== Undeclared written episode ===
Forrester co-wrote (with Judd Apatow) the following episode:

- "The Perfect Date" (February 19, 2002)

=== The Office written episodes ===
Forrester has written or co-written the following episodes:

1. "The Merger" (November 16, 2006) – Season 3
2. "Business School" (February 15, 2007) – Season 3
3. "Product Recall" co-written with Justin Spitzer (April 26, 2007) – Season 3
4. "Did I Stutter?" co-written with Justin Spitzer (May 1, 2008) – Season 4
5. "Business Trip" (November 13, 2008) – Season 5
6. "Blood Drive" (March 5, 2009) – Season 5
7. "Mafia" (October 15, 2009) – Season 6
8. "New Leads" (March 18, 2010) – Season 6
9. "The Search" (February 3, 2011) – Season 7
10. "Work Bus" (October 18, 2012) – Season 9
11. "A.A.R.M." (May 9, 2013) – Season 9

=== Love written episodes ===
Forrester has written or co-written the following episodes:

- "One Long Day" (February 19, 2016) – with Lesley Arfin and Paul Rust
- "The Table Read" (February 19, 2016)

== Directing credits ==
=== The Office directed episodes ===
Forrester has directed the following episodes:

1. "Casual Friday" (April 30, 2009) – Season 5
2. "New Leads" (March 18, 2010) – Season 6
3. "Test the Store" (March 1, 2012) – Season 8
4. "The Target" (November 29, 2012) – Season 9
