= James S. Forrester (cardiologist) =

American cardiologist

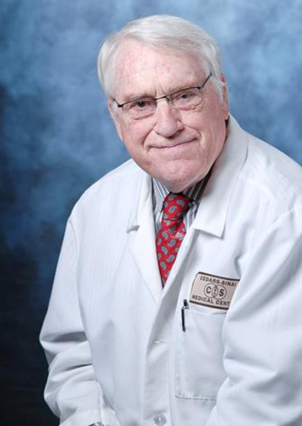
- Born: Philadelphia, Pennsylvania
- Education: Camp Hill High School; Swarthmore College (BS); University of Pennsylvania (MD); UCLA Mediceal residency; Harvard cardiology fellowship
- Children: Brent Forrester
- Awards: Lifetime Achievement; Pioneer in Medicine

James S. Forrester III (born July 13, 1937) is an American cardiologist. Forrester was born in Philadelphia, Pennsylvania. He received his medical training at the University of Pennsylvania, UCLA, and Harvard University.During the 1970s through 1990s, his research led to three advancements in the practice of cardiology. He later returned to UCLA as a professor and served as the Chief of the Division of Cardiology at Cedars-Sinai Medical Center. Forrester has published papers and manuscripts on cardiology and received the Lifetime Achievement Award of the American College of Cardiology in 2009.

== Early life and career ==
His secondary school education was in the small central Pennsylvania town of Camp Hill, where his father was a doctor. He received his bachelor's degree from Swarthmore College in 1959, and his medical degree from the University of Pennsylvania in 1963. Following internship at the hospital of the University of Pennsylvania, and internal medical residency at UCLA-Harbor Medical Center, he completed his cardiology fellowship at Harvard's Brigham and Women's Hospital. In the late 1960s he was appointed Director of Cardiovascular Research at Cedars-Sinai Medical Center in Los Angeles.

== Career 1970s–1990s ==
Forrester directed a multimillion-dollar National Institute of Health research program called a Specialized Center of Research in Ischemic Heart Disease at Cedars-Sinai Medical Center. During this 20-year period Cedars-Sinai cardiology was ranked first in the western United States by U.S. News & World Report, a position which it continues to hold through the present day. Forrester's research led to three advances that altered the practice of cardiology. In the 1970s, he directed the development of hemodynamic monitoring at the bedside, using a balloon-tipped catheter he maneuvered through the heart. He used these measurements to create a method of care for patients with acute myocardial infarction that became known as the Forrester hemodynamic subsets. Hemodynamic monitoring allowed doctors to repeatedly measure the effect of drugs on the function of the heart at the bedside for the care of critically ill patients. The second advance came in the early 1980s, when Forrester and George Diamond created the field of probability analysis for coronary heart disease, which became known as the Diamond-Forrester method for interpreting diagnostic tests. Their approach integrated a patient's pre-test likelihood of having disease with the sensitivity and specificity of the diagnostic test to calculate a patient's post-test likelihood of disease. The method is now used worldwide in cardiology. The third major advance to which Forrester contributed came in the early 1990s: Forrester led a team that developed coronary angioscopy, a method for seeing inside a living patient's coronary arteries using a thin flexible fiberoptic catheter. His team discovered the presence of small, partially occlusive blood clots in patients with unstable angina (now called acute coronary syndrome), leading to the modern implementation of antiplatelet and anticoagulant therapy in this condition.

== Later career ==
In later years Forrester became Professor of Medicine at the University of California, Los Angeles, School of Medicine, the George Burns and Gracie Allen Professor of Cardiovascular Research, and Chief of the Division of Cardiology at Cedars-Sinai Medical Center. In these roles, he served as mentor for several hundred cardiologists, a number of whom are currently leaders in cardiovascular medicine. Forrester has published over 400 full-length scientific manuscripts and book chapters dealing with these topics. In 2009, he was the second-ever recipient of the American College of Cardiology’s highest honor, the Lifetime Achievement Award. Additional honors include Cable News Network's 10 Medical Scientists to Watch (1989), the Leon Goodman Award for excellence in laser research, the Distinguished Scientific Achievement Award of the American Heart Association in Los Angeles, the Jan Kellerman Award for research in preventive cardiology, and the 2011 Simon Dack Award for Outstanding Scholarship from the Journal of American College of Cardiology.{} The following year he was the annual awardee for the Camp Hill High School Wall of Honor. In 2013 he received the annual Pioneer of Medicine Award from Cedars-Sinai Medical Center. At the award ceremony, his colleagues created a 10-minute video describing his career and his contributions to their own careers. In 2014 he was chosen to deliver the lecture celebrating the American College of Cardiology's 65th Anniversary.{} In 1949-2014: 65 Years of Cardiovascular History, he described the people and events that changed the care of heart disease in his lifetime. He is the author of The Heart Healers: The Misfits, Mavericks, and Rebels Who Created the Greatest Medical Breakthrough of Our Lives, published in September, 2015 by St. Martin's Press. The book, which appeared as an Amazon best seller in its category, is a historical memoir of his personal relationships with the pioneers who created heart surgery, defibrillators, pacemakers, coronary care units, heart imaging, and angioplasty, and tells stories about the emotional impact of these lifesaving advances on his individual patients. In 2019 he received the annual Cedars-Sinai Medical Center Lifetime Achievement Award.
