= Randall Einhorn =

American TV director and cinematographer

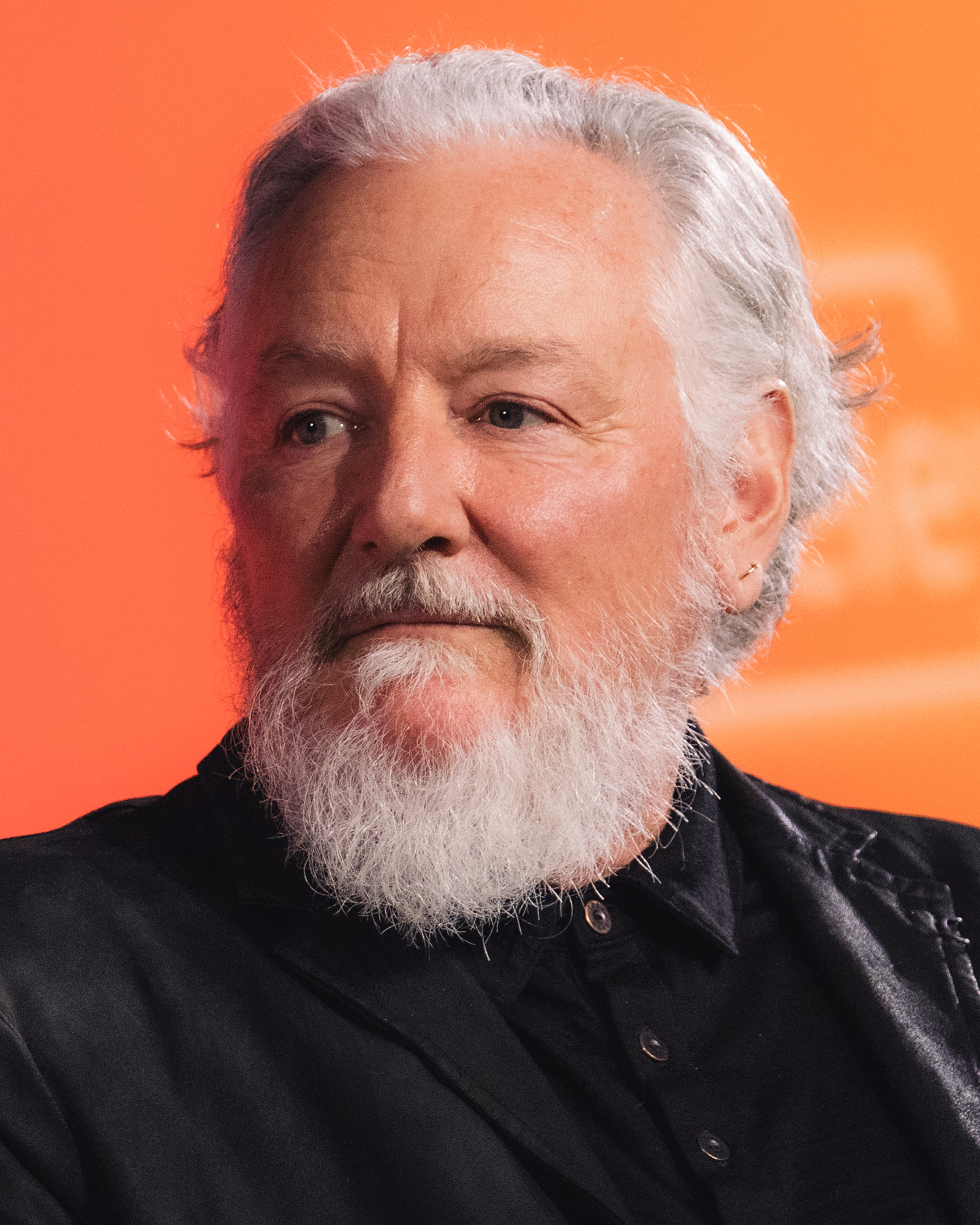
- Einhorn in 2026
- Born: December 7, 1963 (age 62); Cincinnati, Ohio, U.S.
- Occupations: television director, cinematographer, television producer

Randall Einhorn (born December 7, 1963) is an American television cinematographer, director, and producer, best known for his work on The Office, Wilfred, It's Always Sunny in Philadelphia, Survivor, and Abbott Elementary.

== Early life and career ==
Born in Cincinnati, Ohio, Einhorn grew up in Tarzana, CA, and attended William Howard Taft High School. He is the son of Television producer Lawrence Einhorn.

He began his career in the late 1990s, working sporadically as director and cinematographer on several different projects, including Fear Factor, Eco-Challenge, and Survivor, for which he was nominated for two Emmy Awards.

Einhorn is best known for his work as a cinematographer and occasional director on The Office. He also directed The Accountants, a ten-part webisode spin-off of The Office which appeared online between the second and third seasons. In tribute to Einhorn's contribution to the series, the Season 6 episode of The Office, The Cover-Up, was dedicated to Larry Einhorn, Randall's father, who died on April 20, 2010. Randall also plays the role of CFO of Dunder Mifflin, until he resigns in Season 2, Episode 2 of The Office.

Between 2009 and 2011, while still working on The Office, Einhorn took on the roles of producer and director for 14 episodes of It's Always Sunny in Philadelphia. He went on to direct several episodes of Parks and Recreation and Fargo and produce and direct for Nurse Jackie and all but three episodes of Wilfred.

In May 2015, it was announced that Einhorn would be the executive producer and director of The Muppets, executive produced and co-created by Bill Prady (co-creator of The Big Bang Theory) and Bob Kushell (Anger Management, 3rd Rock from the Sun, The Simpsons). The show was canceled after one season.

Since working on The Muppets, Einhorn has continued to produce and direct for various comic film and television projects, including The Mick and The Kids Are Alright. Recently, he and his Sad Unicorn production company made a multi-year, first-look deal with Warner Bros. Television.

In 2019, Einhorn sold two single-camera comedy projects, Us & Them to NBC and Married with Roommates to ABC.

Einhorn currently serves an executive producer and a director on the ABC series Abbott Elementary. In March 2023, it was announced that he would direct the upcoming ABC comedy pilot Public Defenders.

== Select directing filmography ==
- 2006-2011, The Office, TV Series, 15 episodes
- 2009–2011, It's Always Sunny in Philadelphia, TV Series, 14 episodes
- 2009, Modern Family, TV Series, 2 episodes
- 2012–2013, Nurse Jackie, TV Series, 7 episodes
- 2014, Wilfred, TV Series, 46 episodes
- 2015, Death Pact, TV movie
- 2015, The Red Road, TV Series, 4 episodes
- 2015, The Muppets : First Look Presentation, short
- 2015, Fargo, TV series, 3 episodes
- 2015–2016, The Muppets, TV series, 13 episodes
- 2017, The Mick, TV series, 8 episodes
- 2017, Me, Myself and I, TV series, 1 episode
- 2018, Lodge 49, TV series, 3 episodes
- 2018–2019, The Kids Are Alright, TV series, 8 episodes
- 2020, Gumshoe, TV movie
- 2020, Prospect, TV movie
- 2021–present, Abbott Elementary, TV series, 32 episodes
