= Oscar Martinez (The Office) =

- The Office and The Paper character
- Oscar Nunez as Oscar Martinez
- First appearance: "Pilot"; The Office; March 24, 2005
- Created by: Greg Daniels; Ricky Gervais; Stephen Merchant
- Based on: Oliver (British counterpart)
- Portrayed by: Oscar Nunez

In-universe information
- Occupation: Chief Accountant, Dunder Mifflin, Scranton; Accountant, Dunder Mifflin, Scranton, Chief Accountant, Toledo Truth Teller, Toledo
- Significant others: Gil; Robert Lipton
- Children: Phillip Schrute (godson)
- Nationality: Mexican-American

Oscar Martinez is a fictional character in the American mockumentary-style television series The Office and the follow-up spinoff series The Paper. His counterpart in the British iteration of the show is accountant Oliver. Oscar appears in 176 of 188 episodes of The Office and is portrayed by Oscar Nunez.

In February 2025, it was announced that Nunez would be reprising his role as Oscar Martinez, in the follow-up series to The Office, called The Paper. The first season premiered 10 episodes on Peacock on September 4.

== Character ==
=== Personality ===
Oscar is known for being an intellectual, rational, and quietly efficient worker in the office. He refers to himself as being in the "Coalition for Reason" with co-workers Jim Halpert (John Krasinski), Pam Halpert (Jenna Fischer), and Toby Flenderson (Paul Lieberstein). Considered to be a know-it-all by many of his co-workers, Oscar is frequently exasperated by the antics of the office, though he often joins Kevin Malone (Brian Baumgartner) in antagonizing uptight Angela Martin (Angela Kinsey).

=== Biography ===
Oscar Martinez has been an accountant at the Scranton branch office of Dunder Mifflin since 1999. In the first-season episode "Diversity Day", he is revealed to have been the son of Mexican parents who immigrated to the United States one year before he was born. A gay man, he is outed by Michael Scott (Steve Carell) in the third-season premiere, "Gay Witch Hunt". Nunez explained in a 2008 interview that the character feels amusement, pity, and hatred towards Michael.

In earlier seasons, he is seen driving a Saturn Ion. He replaces this with a Lexus RX 400h, a company car leased to him as part of Dunder Mifflin's desire to avoid a lawsuit after the events of "Gay Witch Hunt".

In the finale of The Office (shown in 2013), Oscar is preparing to make a run for the Pennsylvania state senate. He won his election, but presumably failed to be elected to another term and returned to Dunder Mifflin. In 2019, Oscar, then still working at Dunder Mifflin, accepted a transfer from Scranton to Toledo from Dunder Mifflin's new parent company Enervate. From 2019 forward, Oscar has been working as an accountant for Enervate in Toledo. Beginning in 2025, he also worked on a volunteer basis as a reporter for The Toledo Truth Teller.

== LGBTQ representation ==
The third season reveal of Oscar's sexuality represented, for the time, a rare example of a regular sitcom character being openly gay. During the 2006–2007 season, the Gay & Lesbian Alliance Against Defamation (GLAAD) reported he was the only LGBT person of color character on a regular series. The following year, he was the "only remaining gay character on a half-hour comedy program". For the 2009–2010 season, Martinez represented one of four regular series characters who were LGBT persons of color; by 2010–2011, there were six, and in 2011–2012 there were five.

Oscar's homosexuality is first explicitly addressed in "Gay Witch Hunt." In this episode, it is revealed that he is gay, and Michael's mishandling of the situation (including kissing him without consent) leads to Dunder Mifflin offering Oscar a paid vacation and company car to avoid a lawsuit. As one of the show's more private characters, Oscar's romantic relationships and personal life are only occasionally featured.

Almost all of Oscar's co-workers are accepting of his homosexuality (including Michael and Kevin, although both continue to make ignorant and immature comments about it, which Oscar generally shrugs off). An exception is fellow accountant Angela, whose conservative Christian views lead her to react to Oscar with extreme bigotry at first. However, she later realizes the error of her ways and apologizes to Oscar for her negative reactions and comments.

== Reception ==
Screen Rant said Oscar "might seem like one of the more normal people in The Office... but watching a season or two will reveal his own quirks, as well. However, along with these quirks, some nonsensical aspects of his character might also come into the limelight."
