= David Rogers (film editor) =

American filmmaker

- Occupations: Film editor, television director, television producer
- Years active: 1996–present

David Rogers is an American film editor, television director and producer best known for working on NewsRadio, Entourage, The Office, and Space Force. In 2007, he received the Primetime Emmy Award for Outstanding Single-Camera Picture Editing for a Comedy Series for his work on The Office's third season finale, "The Job", which he shared with Dean Holland and another Emmy for the series finale, "Finale", which he shared with Claire Scanlon.

== Professional background ==
Rogers began his career as an assistant editor on a variety of sitcoms throughout the mid-to-late 1990s and into the 2000s. These shows included The Single Guy, Seinfeld, Oh, Grow Up and NewsRadio. He first worked as a senior editor on the Seinfeld episode The Clip Show in 1998. Since then he has edited on comedies such as NewsRadio, The O'Keefes, The Comeback and Entourage, as well as 95 broadcast episodes of The Office. He started directing episodes of The Office in season 5, with the episode "Employee Transfer" being his directorial debut, and at the beginning of the sixth season, Rogers became an associate producer on the series. He attained the rank of co-producer beginning with seventh season.

Rogers worked as a Supervising Producer/Editor/Director on the romantic sitcom The Mindy Project from 2013 to 2017, and was part of the production team that transitioned to Hulu after the show was canceled by FOX after three seasons.

As NBC was launching their streaming service Peacock, Rogers pitched the idea to include footage and promotional materials that would traditionally be included on DVD copies as bonus materials. This later became the impetus for the creation of the Peacock-exclusive "Superfan" episodes of The Office, in which Rogers has edited additional footage and deleted scenes along with the original broadcast episodes to create extended versions of some episodes.

== Filmography ==
Year	Title	Notes
2008-2013	The Office	Director, 10 episodes
2010-2017	Night at the Theatre	Director, 28 episodes
2010	The Hard Times of RJ Berger	Director, 2 episodes
2011	Parks and Recreation	Director, 1 episode
2011	Friends with Benefits	Director, 1 episode
2013-2017	The Mindy Project	Director, 11 episodes
2020	Space Force	Director, 1 episode
2020-2023	Upload	Director, 2 episodes
2025	The Paper	Director, 1 episode

== Awards and nominations ==
Rogers was nominated by the Television Academy five times for his editing work on The Office, winning one Prime-Time Emmy for each of the episodes "The Job" in 2007 and "The Finale" in 2013. Rogers also won two American Cinema Editors "Eddie" Awards for these episodes.
