= Broke (The Office) =

- The Office episode
- Episode no.: Season 5 Episode 25
- Directed by: Steve Carell
- Written by: Charlie Grandy
- Cinematography by: Randall Einhorn
- Editing by: David Rogers
- Production code: 525
- Original air date: April 23, 2009

Guest appearances
- Idris Elba as Charles Miner; Andy Buckley as David Wallace; Ellie Kemper as Erin Hannon; Kurt Scholler as Ty Platt

Episode chronology
← Previous "Heavy Competition"	Next → "Casual Friday"
- The Office (American season 5)

"Broke" is the twenty-fifth episode of the fifth season of the television series The Office and the 97th overall episode of the series. It originally aired on NBC in the United States on April 23, 2009. In this episode, Michael learns his paper company is broke, and tries to keep this fact a secret when Dunder Mifflin offers to buy out the Michael Scott Paper Company since the company has stolen most of Dunder Mifflin Scranton's core clients.

The episode was written by Charlie Grandy and directed by Steve Carell, marking his directorial debut. "Broke" was the last of a six-episode arc involving Michael quitting to start the Michael Scott Paper Company; it was also the last of six episodes to prominently feature Idris Elba as Dunder Mifflin V.P. Charles Miner. According to Nielsen ratings, it was watched by 7.21 million viewers, and received the season's lowest rating in the 18–49 age group during its regular timeslot to that point in the season.

== Plot ==
Michael Scott, Pam Beesly and Ryan Howard make paper deliveries in a used van. This routine, in addition to their duties at the Michael Scott Paper Company, takes such a toll on the group that they look into hiring a delivery person. They are told by their accountant that because of their fixed cost pricing model, they not only cannot afford a delivery person, but will be bankrupt in a month.

At Dunder Mifflin, Charles Miner announces that the Scranton branch, previously the company's most profitable office, has lost ten major clients to Michael's company. Chief Financial Officer David Wallace visits Scranton to see what can be done to stem the losses. In an about-face from his no-nonsense persona, Charles sucks up to David. David calls a meeting with Charles and Jim Halpert, but Charles insists Dwight Schrute be present because he is Charles's right-hand man. During the meeting, Dwight embarrasses Charles with outlandish suggestions.

David decides the cheapest option is for Dunder Mifflin to buy out the Michael Scott Paper Company. Jim has learned the company's financial situation from Pam but feigns uncertainty when asked whether Michael is likely to be interested in a buyout. At David and Charles's orders, Jim brings the idea of a buyout to Michael, reassuring Michael that Dunder Mifflin is unaware of his company's financial situation. Dwight learns from a past client that Michael is begging customers for more money and informs Charles, but Jim manipulates their conversation so that Charles refuses to listen.

After Michael rejects an initial offer of $12,000 to buy the company, David suggests that he is bluffing, saying he knows that his company's prices are too low to be sustainable. Michael rebuts him and claims that Dunder Mifflin's best branch is "bleeding" and David could be replaced during an upcoming stockholder meeting. David gives a second offer of $60,000, but Michael rejects this offer at the last second and demands the company give him his old job back and hire Ryan and Pam as salespeople. David is reluctant to hire three people with full benefits, especially given Ryan's disastrous history with the company, and likens it to "a multimillion-dollar buyout". Michael refuses to back down, and David agrees to his demands.

As Charles leaves Scranton, Michael does not allow him any final words, mirroring Charles's earlier treatment of Michael.

== Production ==
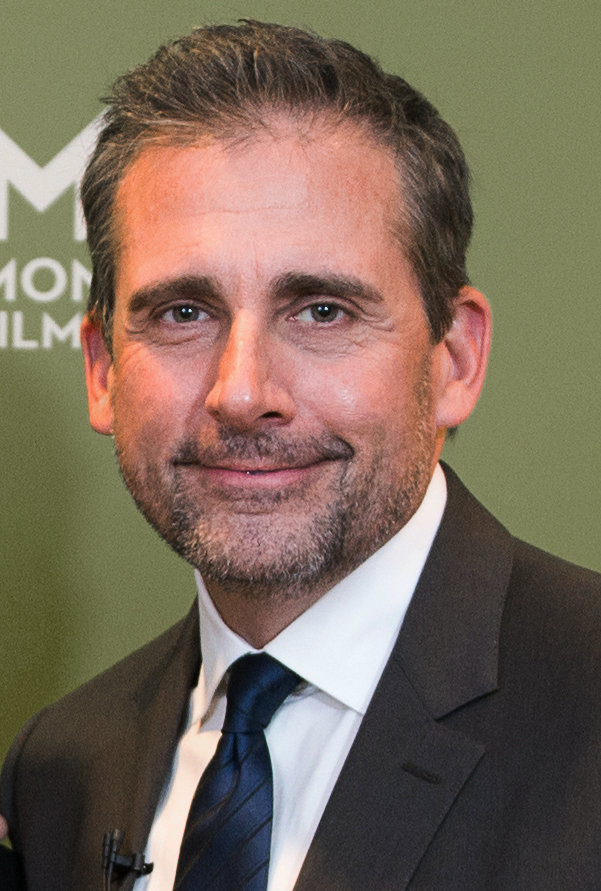
Steve Carell, who stars as The Office protagonist Michael Scott, made his directorial debut with this episode.

"Broke" was written by Charlie Grandy and directed by Steve Carell, who made his directorial debut with the episode. It was the last of a six-episode story arc involving Idris Elba's character Charles Miner, although Elba has indicated the character would return in future episodes: "Mr. Charles doesn't leave the picture. [...] My storyline has come to an end, but there is a good indication that the writers see my character coming back." Elba made an appearance in "Company Picnic", the fifth season finale. Elba said he did not watch "Broke" after it aired because "I'm hypercritical about my work, so I try not to torture myself."

The official website for The Office included three cut scenes from "Broke". In the first 90-second clip, Michael is running late because he overslept, and he instinctively runs into the Dunder Mifflin office by accident instead of his Michael Scott Paper Company office. In the second one-minute clip, Andy is angry that he cannot find his personalized coffee mug with his face on it, and he and the others around the office complain about losing their clients to Michael's new company. In the final 80-second clip, stress drives Ryan to the breaking point and he begins trashing the Michael Scott Paper Company Office, for which he quickly recovers and apologizes.

== Reception ==
In its original American broadcast on April 23, 2009, "Broke" was watched by 7.21 million viewers, according to Nielsen ratings. The episode received a 3.7 rating/10 share among viewers aged 18–49, the lowest rating in that age group for the season during its regular timeslot. It received a 4.0 rating/12 share among viewers 18–34.

"He won. Michael Scott won. And he deserved to. Who would have thought when the series started and Michael was so loathsome, that he could have a moment like this that would be so thrilling? Great, great episode."

— Alan Sepinwall of The Star-Ledger

The episode received highly positive reviews. Alan Sepinwall of The Star-Ledger called "Broke" a "great, great" episode, although he said he wished the Michael Scott Paper Company arc could have lasted longer. Sepinwall praised touches such as the Korean women who were constantly getting into the sales van, and Michael's moment of nervousness on the elevator, and said the ending when Michael came through was particularly satisfying. Will Leitch of New York magazine described "Broke" as "a rousing, exuberant episode that continues one of The Office's best runs in history". Leitch said the negotiations during the latter half of the episode had genuine tension, and that all the storylines of the Michael Scott Paper Company arc were wrapped up perfectly. Travis Fickett of IGN said the episode was strong enough that it could have served as the season finale. He said the episode had many good throw-away moments, like Charles brown-nosing to David and realizing Dwight is eccentric, as well as several clever twists, like Jim's actions in tricking Dwight and helping the Michael Scott Paper Company get bought out. Eric Rezsnyak of the City Newspaper said the episode was a strong finale to the Michael Scott Paper Company arc, which was "probably the best thing to happen to the show in the last two seasons". Rezsnyak praised Michael's impressive actions in the episode and said he was curious to see how Michael's relationship with several of the supporting characters would be recast as a result of this episode.

Margaret Lyons of Entertainment Weekly said, "'Broke' was an incredibly brisk episode that covered a lot of ground, so it worked as a good capstone on the whole Michael-leaving-the-company plot." She also said although the plot arc was a good one, she looked forward to future episodes focusing more on the Dunder Mifflin supporting cast. Rick Porter of Zap2it praised the episode, but expressed concern that the show would grow more stale now that Michael, Pam and Ryan were back to their old jobs at Dunder Mifflin; Porter particularly complimented the new aspects of the Charles Miner character presented in "Broke", including his interaction with David and his exasperation with Dwight. Dan Hopper of Best Week Ever praised the episode and Michael's shrewdness, but also expressed worry that the quality of future episodes would dip now that Dunder Mifflin was back to normal. Nathan Rabin of The A.V. Club said of the episode, "Elba's stint on The Office went out on a high note. I'll miss his joyless scold of a middle manager but it's nice to have the gang reunited." Rabin also said the moment when Charles fails to listen when Dwight learns Michael's company is broke "rang a little false", but praised the episode as a whole. Meghan Carlson of BuddyTV said she enjoyed seeing Michael so victorious at the end, and said, "as far as ends getting tied off cleanly, 'Broke' was an inspired episode, full of tension, suspense, and yes, humor."

"Broke" was voted the highest-rated episode out of 26 from the fifth season, according to an episode poll at the fansite OfficeTally; the episode was rated 9.17 out of 10. For his work on this episode, Charlie Grandy was nominated for a Writers Guild of America Award for Best Screenplay – Episodic Comedy. Steve Carell submitted this episode when he was nominated for the Primetime Emmy Award for Outstanding Lead Actor in a Comedy Series, which he lost to Alec Baldwin.
