= Diwali (The Office) =

- The Office episode
- Episode no.: Season 3 Episode 6
- Directed by: Miguel Arteta
- Written by: Mindy Kaling
- Cinematography by: Randall Einhorn
- Editing by: Dean Holland
- Production code: 304
- Original air date: November 2, 2006
- Running time: 21 minutes

Guest appearances
- Creed Bratton as Creed Bratton; Charles Esten as Josh Porter; Ed Helms as Andy Bernard; Rashida Jones as Karen Filippelli; Nancy Walls as Carol Stills

Episode chronology
← Previous "Initiation"	Next → "Branch Closing"
- The Office (American season 3)

"Diwali" is the sixth episode of the third season of the American comedy television series The Office and the show's 34th overall. It was written by Mindy Kaling, who also acts in the show as Kelly Kapoor, and directed by Miguel Arteta. The episode first aired on November 2, 2006, on NBC, twelve days after the actual Diwali holiday.

The series depicts the everyday lives of office employees in the Scranton, Pennsylvania, branch of the fictional Dunder Mifflin Paper Company. In the episode, Kelly Kapoor (Mindy Kaling) invites the office to a Diwali celebration, where Ryan Howard (B. J. Novak) struggles to make a good impression on Kelly's parents and Michael Scott (Steve Carell) considers taking his relationship with Carol Stills (Nancy Carell) to the next step. Meanwhile, at the Stamford branch, Jim Halpert (John Krasinski) and Andy Bernard (Ed Helms) get drunk while working late, leading Karen Filippelli (Rashida Jones) to give Jim a ride home.

Kaling and executive producer Greg Daniels came up with the episode idea after Kaling held a Diwali party in 2005 for series staff. She undertook research about Indian culture and the resulting episode was substituted in place of one that would have been Halloween-themed. The episode was directed by Miguel Arteta. According to Nielsen Media Research, an estimated 8.8 million viewers tuned in; it earned a 4.2/10 rating among adults aged 18 to 49, placing first in this demographic group. Critical reception to the episode was largely positive, with many praising Kaling's writing, Carell's performance, and other comedic elements. As a result of the episode, The Office became the first American comedy series to depict the holiday, and several commentators have credited it with helping introduce Indian customs to American audiences.

== Plot ==
Kelly Kapoor invites the entire office staff to a celebration of Diwali, the Hindu Festival of Lights, which Michael Scott mistakenly believes to be an Indian version of Halloween. Ryan Howard fails to make a favorable impression on Kelly's parents, who in turn try to set up Kelly with a young doctor. Initially reluctant to attend the festival, Pam Beesly gives in and ends up enjoying herself. Inspired by a conversation with Kelly's parents about Hindu marriage customs, Michael publicly proposes to Carol. Uncomfortable and already embarrassed by her cheerleader outfit (worn because Michael had told her it was a costume party), Carol declines his offer and leaves. Later, Michael makes a pass at Pam, which she rebuffs before reluctantly giving him a ride home.

Meanwhile, in Stamford, Jim Halpert decides to bike to work. Working late, Andy Bernard turns a late night of paperwork into an excuse to drink, although Karen, unbeknownst to Jim and Andy, pours her shots into her wastebasket. After several shots, Jim passes out at his desk, missing a text from Pam. Jim tries to bicycle home but is too drunk, crashing after leaving the office, and an amused Karen gives him a ride.

== Production ==
=== Writing and filming ===
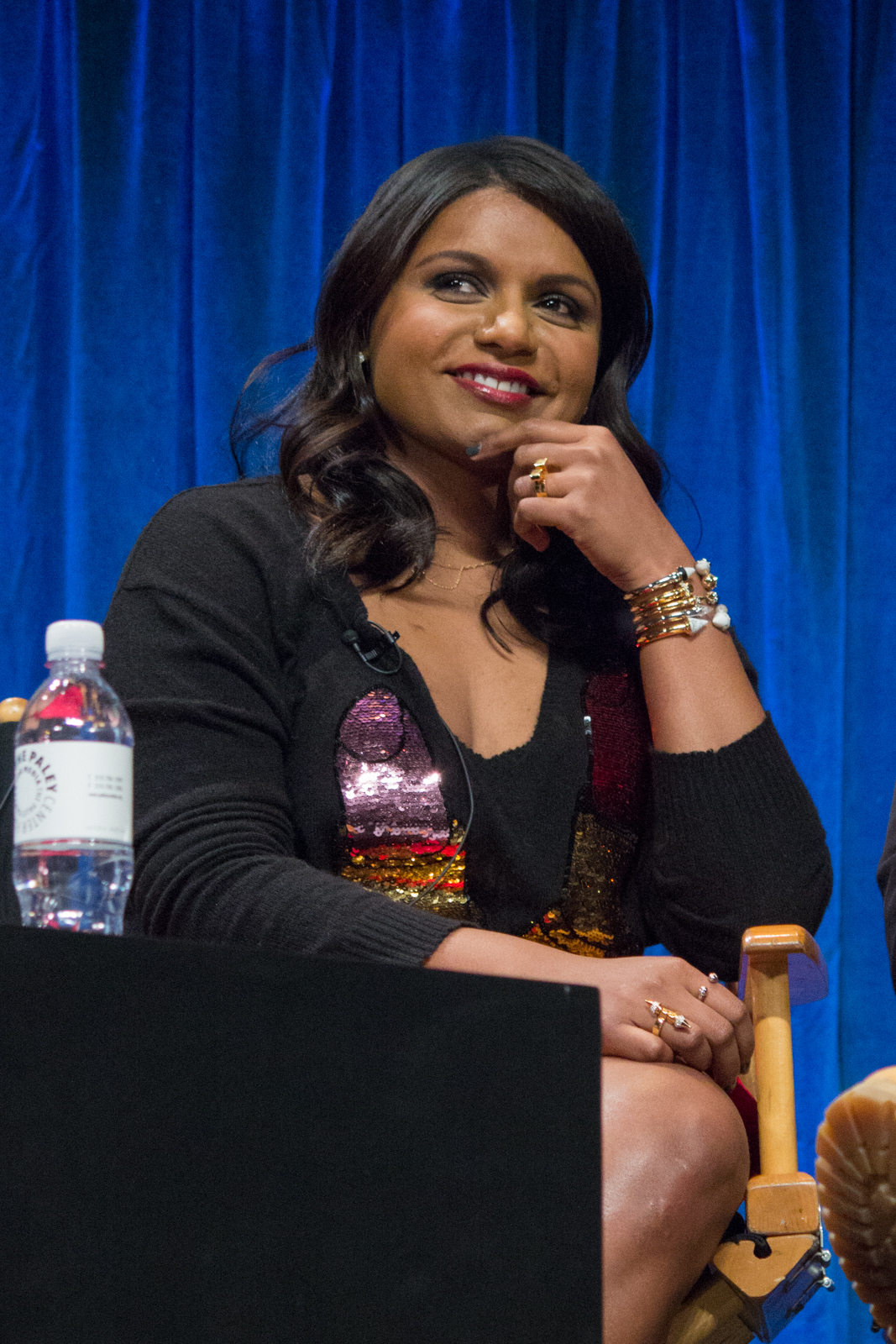
Mindy Kaling drew upon her own cultural background to write the episode.

"Diwali" was written by Mindy Kaling and directed by Miguel Arteta. While the episode is partly set at West Scranton High School, filming actually took place at Grant High School in Los Angeles, the same building where Freaks and Geeks was shot. That series' co-creator, Paul Feig, has directed several episodes of The Office, including "Email Surveillance".

Kaling used her own Indian cultural background as inspiration when writing the episode, which portrays the Indian festival of Diwali. She and her friend, My Name Is Earl writer Vali Chandrasekaran, had held a Diwali party in 2005 for the cast of their two shows. According to Kaling, NBC was "so excited. They were like, 'What the hell is this holiday? I've never heard of it'." The following year, while discussing the possible creation of a Halloween episode, she and executive producer Greg Daniels agreed to instead create one that was Diwali-themed, as the two holidays fall near each other.

When it came time to write the episode however, Kaling had to perform a Google search, as she had forgotten many details. She explained, "I was a little embarrassed with how little I knew about it. I'm Hindu, but I'm not really a practicing Hindu, so I had to do a lot of research." Kaling was pleased to learn more about her culture, at first being concerned that Daniels "and people I work with were a little antsy about assigning the Hindu writer the Indian episode. I didn't want to feel like they pigeonholed me, but I felt like I'd done enough episodes that it was okay." She found that making the episode "was kind of the perfect meeting of being the child of immigrants and writing for a comedy show". The series writers have since joked that they should do a Diwali-themed episode every year in the same vein as the Christmas specials.

When creating the story, Kaling knew that "a lot of stuff has to happen" in the midst of the festival, including Michael and Carol's relationship becoming "very roller-coastery". As with other series storylines, this development was decided upon before Kaling began writing the episode. She stated, "But it was always sort of built in that the peak of 'Diwali' would be this incredibly romantic overture [and its uncomfortable aftermath]." Kaling was pleased that much of "Diwali" took place at Stamford, especially as she was able to explore the contrasts between the two offices. She also liked that the episode contained "romance, people getting dressed up in costumes, lots of food, smooching and making out ... and little girls making fun of B.J. Novak".

In her weekly blog for TV Guide, actress Kate Flannery wrote that "Mindy shares that B.J. Novak talent of being able to write an incredibly funny episode ("Hot Girl," "The Injury") and be in it. Diwali is the Indian festival of lights. So this week Dunder-Mifflin gets a spicy taste of Indian culture in a hurry. Michael decides the office needs an outing to the local high school for the annual Indian Diwali party."

=== Casting ===
Kaling cast her own mother and father, a doctor and an architect respectively, as the parents of her character. Kaling was proud of their acting, though she admitted that their presence on set was at first "mortifying". She commented, "Of course I sort of lapsed back into that pre-teen attitude of every single thing my parents do embarrasses me. But they were great about it. They were such pros – they had all these scenes with Steve Carell and they were completely unafraid. They got along effortlessly." Kaling injected elements of Romeo and Juliet and Pride and Prejudice into her character's relationship with Ryan, with her parents attempting to persuade her to date an Indian doctor. She remarked, "Kelly's family has, like, nine daughters, and if only they could marry them off it would be wonderful. But Kelly is the oldest and most idiotic of them all."

Though he wanted to avoid becoming an actor, Chandrasekaran was cast by Kaling as the "suitable boy" Kelly's parents want her to marry. Chandrasekaran later stated, "I asked Mindy to write as few lines as possible. Acting is not a skill that I have particularly a lot of." Other guest stars included Creed Bratton as Creed Bratton, Charles Esten as Josh Porter, Ed Helms as Andy Bernard, and Rashida Jones as Karen Filippelli. Nancy Carell, Steve Carell's wife, reprised her role as Carol Stills, the girlfriend of his character.

=== Deleted scenes ===
The third season DVD contains a number of deleted scenes, including Angela complaining about attending the Diwali party, Michael revealing that he is endorsing the Diwali party in order to make it up to Kelly for his insensitivity towards her Indian background in "Diversity Day", Kelly explaining that Diwali is an "Indian Halloween" to Michael, an angry Jan becoming suddenly supportive about the office attending the festival after she inadvertently offends Kelly by saying she thought she was Muslim, Michael telling the staff that Ben Kingsley liberated India and then became an actor, Kevin ridiculing Michael over his failed proposal, and Dwight assuring Angela that he is not interesting in courting Indian women.

== Reception ==
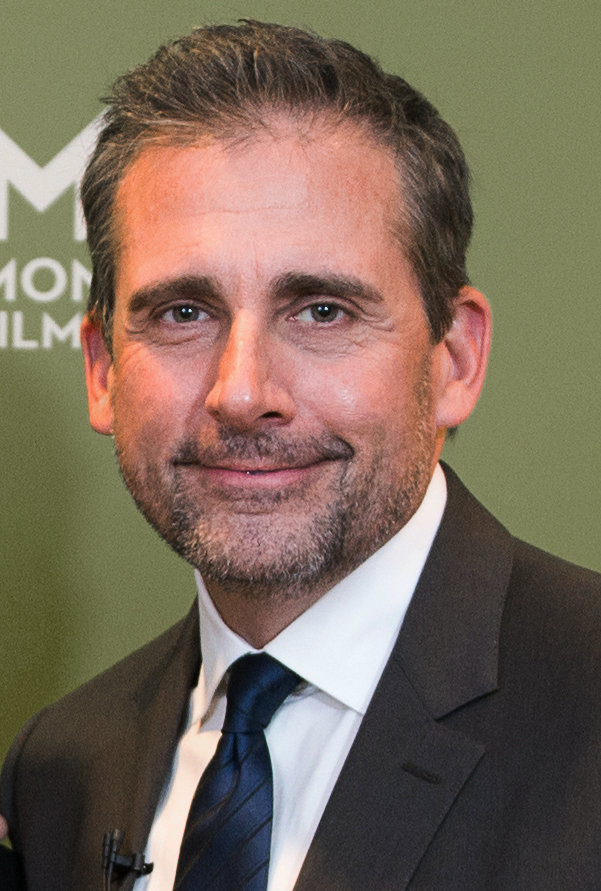
Steve Carell received positive critical reception for his performance.

"Diwali" first aired on November 2, 2006, in the United States on NBC during November sweeps week. According to Nielsen Media Research, an estimated 8.8 million viewers watched the episode, and it earned a 4.2/10 ratings share among adults aged 18 to 49. In other words, it was seen by 4.2 percent of all 18- to 49-year-olds, and 10 percent of all 18- to 49-year-olds watching television at the time of the broadcast. This was the series' highest rating since the season premiere. The episode also ranked first in its timeslot among both adults and men aged 18 to 34.

"Diwali" received generally positive reviews from television critics. Entertainment Weekly columnist Abby West thought the episode "hit all the show's major buttons," focusing on Michael while also furthering the Jim/Karen and Pam/Roy storylines as well as showcasing the other characters. West added that "Kaling gets what makes the show work, and she pulled it together while displaying great timing." AOL TV's Michael Sciannamea considered the episode "a classic," though he thought that "the Stamford scenes don't seem to add much to the story other than the burgeoning flirtation between Jim and Karen." Sciannamea concluded that it was "a terrific episode. The scenes inside the hall were hysterical, especially the dancing."

Brian Zoromski of IGN rated "Diwali" 9.3 out of 10, an indication of an "amazing" episode. He wrote that "Michael completely stole the episode with a truly dizzying number of uncomfortable situations. Daily Show vet Steve Carell has become the king of the uncomfortable moment, throwing himself completely into situations viewers know won't end well." Like West, Zoromski also appreciated the other characters' moments, such as Angela's "xenophobic" comments during the festivities. Television Without Pity gave the episode an A grade.

== Cultural impact ==
As a result of this episode, The Office became the first American comedy series to depict the Diwali holiday. Lauren Markoe of The Huffington Post has credited the episode with helping to introduce Diwali to the American public, writing that it "represents perhaps the brightest spotlight ever shone on Diwali in the United States." In their 2012 book Diversity in U.S. Mass Media, Catherine A. Luther, Carolyn Ringer Lepre, and Naeemah Clark noted that "Diwali" "introduces the audience to Indian dancing and singing, a tradition rarely seen on television."
