= Grief Counseling (The Office) =

- The Office episode
- Episode no.: Season 3 Episode 4
- Directed by: Roger Nygard
- Written by: Jennifer Celotta
- Cinematography by: Randall Einhorn
- Editing by: David Rogers
- Production code: 303
- Original air date: October 12, 2006
- Running time: 23 minutes

Guest appearances
- Creed Bratton as Creed Bratton; Charles Esten as Josh Porter; Ed Helms as Andy Bernard; Rashida Jones as Karen Filippelli

Episode chronology
← Previous "The Coup"	Next → "Initiation"
- The Office (American season 3)

"Grief Counseling" is the fourth episode of the third season of the American comedy television series The Office and the show's 32nd overall. The episode was written by co-executive producer Jennifer Celotta and directed by Roger Nygard, making it Nygard's only series credit. It first aired on NBC in the United States on October 12, 2006.

The series depicts the everyday lives of office employees in the Scranton, Pennsylvania branch of the fictional Dunder Mifflin Paper Company. In the episode, Michael Scott (Steve Carell) is overcome with grief when he learns about the death of his former boss Ed Truck. Michael spends the rest of the day attempting grief counseling for the mostly grief-lacking office. Meanwhile, in Stamford Jim Halpert (John Krasinski) and Karen Filippelli (Rashida Jones) embark on a quest for a particular brand of potato chips.

The outdoor scenes were filmed during the summer, although the cast had to pretend like it was in the middle of winter; this included wearing coats. "Grief Counseling" earned a Nielsen rating of 4.1 with an 11 percent share in the 18- to 49-year-old demographic and was watched by 8.83 million viewers. The episode was viewed favorably by most television critics; Pam's pranks and the bird funeral were a particular source of praise, as was Michael's monologue on the five stages of grief.

== Synopsis ==
Michael Scott is informed by Jan Levinson that his former boss Ed Truck has died. Kelly Kapoor and Phyllis Lapin console Michael after he breaks the news to a mostly unmoved staff. Later, Creed Bratton tells Michael that Truck, heavily inebriated, was decapitated in a truck accident while speeding drunk on U.S. Route 6. Michael summons the staff to a primitive grief counseling session involving a collapsible Hoberman sphere ball, in which Michael tells members of the staff to give stories of deceased love ones. This leads to the staff telling stories about losing loved ones based on death scenes in movies (Million Dollar Baby, The Lion King, and Weekend at Bernie's) with Ryan Howard saying he would elaborate more on his story, but it would take about an hour and a half to do it. Michael becomes frustrated at the office's lack of remorse for Ed Truck's death, stating that Ed Truck sat at Michael's desk and no one seems to care he's gone. Pam Beesly begins to realize Michael is juxtaposing his own fear of not being mourned or missed onto Ed Truck's death.

Toby Flenderson tells Michael that death is a part of life, and uses an example of a bird that flew into a first-floor window that morning. Michael charges outside, picks up the deceased animal and tries in vain to revive it. Michael schedules a parking lot funeral for the bird. Pam fashions a makeshift coffin and reads a prepared speech that comforts Michael and visibly moves him. Pam then proceeds to sing "On the Wings of Love" as Dwight Schrute accompanies her on his recorder. The coffin is placed in a box of shredded paper and set on fire.

Meanwhile, in Stamford, Connecticut, Jim Halpert gains authority over Karen Filippelli's schedule for the day. When Karen mentions her favorite kind of Herr's potato chips is missing from the vending machine, Jim tells Karen that they cannot work until they find her chips. The duo spends the rest of the day searching stores and vending machines around town in a vain attempt to find the chips. But at the end of the day, Karen finds a bag of Herr's on her desk. Jim tells the documentary crew that he traced the chips from the manufacturer to the distributor to the vending machine company to an adjacent office building.

== Production ==
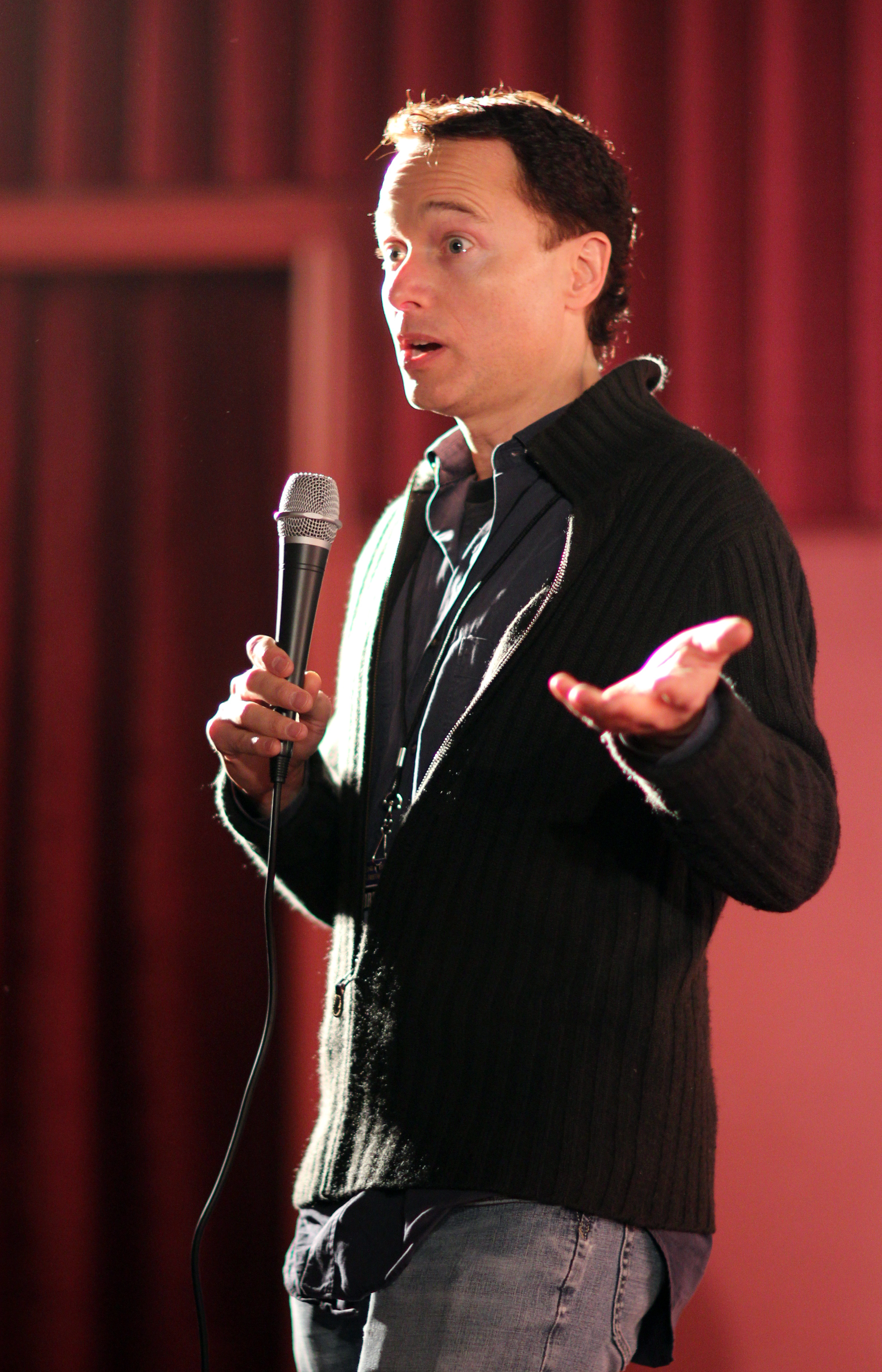
Roger Nygard directed the episode, his only credit for the series.

"Grief Counseling" was written by co-executive producer Jennifer Celotta, and was directed by Roger Nygard, his only episode of The Office to date. In a later interview with Den of Geek, Nygard found that "television episodes are the domain of the writer-producers. You are there to service their vision. The Office is fully scripted, but there's always a little room to play when it's warranted. The first cuts are around 45 minutes, so you often have to cut the episodes in half for air." Though "Grief Counseling" broadcast before the fifth episode, "Initiation", its filming took place after that episode due to the availability of shooting on Dwight's fictional beet farm.

The episode's plot involved the death of former boss Ed Truck, a character who had been played by Ken Howard in the second-season episode "The Carpet". As part of the episode took place outdoors, the cast had to wear coats despite the hot summer weather. Actress Kate Flannery commented in a weekly blog she wrote for TV Guide that "we suffered while shooting the outdoor scenes... We had to act like it was cold when it was warm. For hours and hours. You would never know it by looking at us. Isn't that crazy?" Flannery also wrote, "I love this episode because it's dark, for a comedy. This time The Office tackles gutsy subject matter." In her memoir Is Everyone Hanging Out Without Me?, Mindy Kaling wrote that the episode resulted in the worst disagreement she ever had during her years on the show, where she and Greg Daniels, normally a "very nice" person, disagreed on a story point to the extent that Daniels told her that if "you [were] going to resist what I'm doing here, you can just go home." Kaling briefly left the set before returning, with no further problems or repercussions noted.

Deleted scenes of the episode were released in the third season DVD. Such scenes included a coworker showing Jim photographs of her baby, Dwight telling everyone to delete their records of Ed Truck, Michael talking about a need for a grief counselor, Toby holding a grief counseling session for the office, and Roy telling Pam of the birth of a cousin's twins.

== Reception ==
"Grief Counseling" first aired on October 12, 2006 on NBC in the United States. It received a Nielsen rating of 4.1/11. This means that it was seen by 4.1% of all 18- to 49-year-olds, and 11% of all 18- to 49-year-olds watching television at the time of the broadcast. The episode was viewed by 8.83 million viewers and placed as the 24th most-watched episode for the week in the 18- to 49-year-old demographic.

IGN columnist Brian Zoromski rated "Grief Counseling" 9.5/10, an indication of an "amazing" episode. Writing that the opening sequence "excellently set" the tone of the episode, he found a "ton of great moments", such as Michael's "totally awkward speeches on Ed Truck's death" and his conversation with Dwight over a robot statue. Zoromski saved the most praise for Pam and her pranks, particularly her "completely ridiculous bird funeral... It was all so brilliantly over-the-top it becomes clear that the Scranton office will continue to be enjoyable to watch, as Pam takes over the mocking of the office all on her own, to a hilarious extreme." AOL TV's Michael Sciannamea also lauded Pam and her pranks, especially highlighting her actions during the opening sequence and her song during the bird funeral. Sciannamea assumed that "she feels liberated from Roy (and Jim, to some extent) [and] is allowing her personality and sense of humor to come out even more." He concluded that it was "another solid episode with Steve Carell at his best."

Entertainment Weekly's Abby West expressed praise for an episode that "restored balance and order to our favorite paper-pushers while still nicely forwarding the storylines of TV's plainest super-non-couple." West was also pleased "to have Michael back to his usual insanity", and wrote that Pam "was priceless tonight, from the spot-on reaction shots to the movie-plotlines-as-my-pain gag she started to the almost-believably tender eulogy she delivered for the singing, er, impressionist bird, complete with the most tricked-out pencil-case coffin you've ever seen." Television Without Pity graded the episode with a B−. Michael's monologue about the five stages of grief has also been isolated for praise; Michael Sciannamea called it "the best line of the night," and in 2011, IGN's Cindy White selected it as one of the series' best.
