= Dream Team (The Office) =

- The Office episode
- Episode no.: Season 5 Episode 22
- Directed by: Paul Feig
- Written by: B. J. Novak
- Cinematography by: Randall Einhorn
- Editing by: Claire Scanlon
- Production code: 522
- Original air date: April 9, 2009

Guest appearances
- Idris Elba as Charles Miner; Ranjit Chowdhry as Vikram; Connie Sawyer as "Nana" Scott; Marcus York as Billy Merchant

Episode chronology
← Previous "Two Weeks"	Next → "Michael Scott Paper Company"
- The Office (American season 5)

"Dream Team" is the twenty-second episode of the fifth season of the television series The Office and the 94th overall episode of the series. It originally aired on NBC in the United States on April 9, 2009. In the episode, Pam Beesly (Jenna Fischer) and Michael Scott (Steve Carell) try to keep each other motivated as the two form their new paper company together. Michael recruits Ryan Howard (B. J. Novak) for the company, which sets up a new office in the same building complex as Dunder Mifflin. Meanwhile, Jim Halpert (John Krasinski) tries to impress new boss Charles Miner (guest star Idris Elba) by claiming to be a soccer enthusiast, but it backfires when Dwight Schrute (Rainn Wilson) convinces the two to face each other in a game.

The episode was written by Novak and directed by Paul Feig. The episode aired the same day as the Office episode "Michael Scott Paper Company"; the debut episode of the new NBC show Parks and Recreation was shown between the two episodes. "Dream Team" marked the return of Ryan, who had not appeared on the show since the November 2008 episode "Frame Toby". The episode received generally positive reviews and, according to Nielsen ratings, was watched by 7.2 million viewers and captured the most viewers in its time slot for adults between the ages of 18 and 49. "Dream Team" received a Primetime Emmy Award nomination for Outstanding Single-Camera Picture Editing for a Comedy Series.

== Plot ==
Michael Scott, having left Dunder Mifflin with Pam Beesly, is having trouble starting his first day as president of the Michael Scott Paper Company. Pam keeps things together and suggests they create a list of things to do to maintain a positive working atmosphere. Michael receives a letter from his condo association saying that running a business from his condominium is in violation of his residence agreement, so he needs to find office space for the company. Michael and Pam leave to find potential salesmen and meet with a potential investor.

Michael's first stop is his old part-time telemarketing job to pick up Vikram. Next, they stop at a bowling alley, where Ryan Howard, with bleached blond hair, is now working the shoe counter. Michael asks Ryan to join them, despite protests from Pam. Ryan is convinced and steals two pairs of bowling shoes on the way out. They head to the meeting with the investor, who turns out to be Michael's "nana", at a nursing home. Michael gives her his pitch, but she does not believe his new venture will yield success and refuses to fund his company.

Meanwhile, at the Dunder Mifflin office, since Charles Miner has an obsession with soccer, Jim Halpert claims to be an experienced soccer player in order to get on his good side. Dwight Schrute, attempting to humiliate Jim, suggests that the staff play a game after work in the parking lot. During the game, when Charles kicks the ball towards Jim, he ducks and the ball hits Phyllis Vance in the face. Charles berates Jim for ducking, and Dwight mocks him.

Vikram asks to be brought back to the telemarketing job after he learns "nana" is a term for grandmother. Back at Michael's condo, a frustrated Pam loses her composure and tells Michael she made a mistake leaving Dunder Mifflin and only did it because she was tired of being a receptionist. Michael calms her down, telling her the reality is they both quit and their only option is to continue trying with the new company. Michael leases office space in a large storeroom directly underneath the Dunder Mifflin office. Michael and Pam put their company name in the office lobby directory, where they encounter Charles. Michael taunts Charles that he cannot kick them out of the building now because they are leasing their own space.

== Production ==
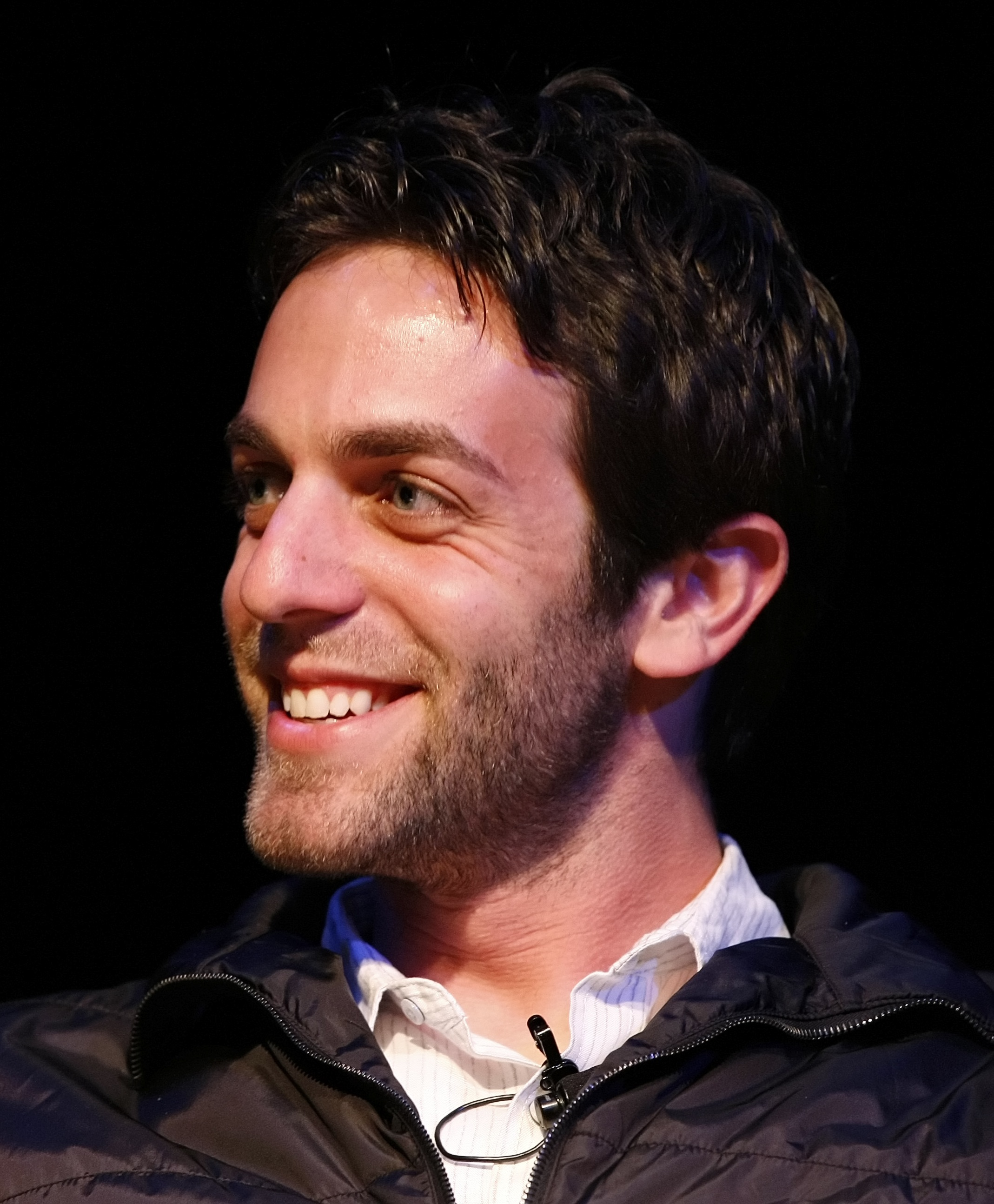
"Dream Team" was written by B. J. Novak, who also returned to play Ryan for the first time in five months.

"Dream Team" was written by B. J. Novak and directed by Paul Feig. It originally aired on April 9, 2009, the same day as the episode "Michael Scott Paper Company"; the debut episode of the new NBC show Parks and Recreation was shown between the two episodes. The episode was titled "Dream Team" before there was even a script for it; Novak deliberately worked the title into the dialogue.

The episode marks the first appearance of Novak as Ryan since "Frame Toby" in November 2008, when Novak left the show to film his role in Quentin Tarantino's Inglourious Basterds. Mindy Kaling, an Office writer who also stars as Kelly Kapoor, thought of the idea of Ryan dying his hair blond. Novak wore a baseball cap in public between the times his hair was dyed and when the episode aired, in order to make the reveal a surprise, and even kept the cap on when he and the rest of the cast and crew did a public forum and Q&A session. "Dream Team" was the third of six episodes guest starring Idris Elba, best known as Stringer Bell from the television series The Wire. Elba said he did not watch the episode when it aired because "I'm hypercritical about my work, so I try not to torture myself."

A variety of methods were attempted for the shot of Phyllis being hit by the soccer ball, but in the take included in the finished episode a CGI ball was used. The initial draft of the script called for Michael and Pam to be standing outside the door of Michael's condo during their climactic exchange, but Jennifer Celotta argued that Pam would refuse to get out of the car. Novak explained, "Visually, I couldn't see it. I couldn't see them face to face with her in the car. And Jen was very adamant: She's in the car and won't get out of the car. And I'm embarrassed that I thought it would work any other way; it's just so perfect." A number of variations of the final scene were shot, including a take where Charles reaches past Michael and pulls the Michael Scott Paper Company letters off the sign, leading Michael and Pam to steal the Dunder Mifflin letters.

Prior to the episode airing, NBC set up a web site for the new Michael Scott Paper Company at michaelscottpapercompany.com, which included a mission statement for the company, photos of the new office space and a downloadable copy of the coupon for "unparalleled customer service" featured in the episode "Michael Scott Paper Company". Another official NBC site, dundermifflininfinity.com, created a Flash game inspired by the episode, in which the viewer attempts to kick a soccer ball past Jim in the office parking lot and hit Phyllis in the face.

The official The Office website included two cut scenes from "Dream Team" within a week of the episode's original release. In one-minute-long clip, Andy continues brown-nosing to Charles; during a documentary interview, Andy says he was not the teacher's pet in school, but that he "walked the teacher's pet, and fed it, and bathed it". A second one-minute clip involves the soccer game itself: Dwight excitedly sets up the game, Jim tries not to show Charles he does not know what "offside" means and Creed picks up the ball and hurls it at Kelly.

== Cultural references ==
Michael refers to his old telemarketing job where he met salesman Vikram; this is a reference to the fourth season episode "Money", in which Michael briefly works a second job as a telemarketer. The bowling alley Ryan works at is Idle Hour Lanes, an actual bowling alley in Dickson City, Pennsylvania, which is just outside the show's setting of Scranton. When Michael discusses song parodies, he names "My Stumps" in a reference to The Black Eyed Peas song "My Humps" and "Achy Breaky Fart" in a reference to the Billy Ray Cyrus song "Achy Breaky Heart". In discussing the formation of the new paper company, Pam refers to the early years of Apple Inc., which she said began in a garage. The seniors at the retirement center where Michael discusses his business are watching Maury, the talk show hosted by Maury Povich, in the background.

== Reception ==
In its original American broadcast on April 9, 2009, "Dream Team" was watched by 7.2 million overall viewers, according to Nielsen ratings. The episode earned more ratings than the Parks and Recreation pilot that immediately followed it (which had 6.8 million viewers) but had less than "Michael Scott Paper Company", which came right after Parks and Recreation and had 8 million viewers. "Dream Team", as well as "Michael Scott Paper Company", had the most viewers in its time slot among adults between the ages of 18 and 49.

"Frankly, The Office kind of needed this sort of shake-up, even if it’s something as simple as another room to put all our characters in. (Though it’s smaller than Michael realized: “165 square feet seemed like a lot.”)"

— Will Leitch of New York

"Dream Team" received generally positive reviews. Alan Sepinwall of The Star-Ledger said he was enjoying the new paper company storyline and that "Dream Team" was funnier than "Michael Scott Paper Company". Sepinwall said the final scene with Michael trying to comfort Pam in the car was a "good payoff" which was well acted by Steve Carell and Jenna Fischer, and "yet another reminder that Michael does know what he's doing some of the time, which means Pam wasn't a complete idiot for following him out the door." He also liked Kevin's struggle with the phones in the beginning, but said the storyline between Jim and Charles was getting repetitive and, "It would help if the writers ever gave Idris Elba something funny to do." Steven Mullen of The Tuscaloosa News called the episode "stellar", said the Charles Miner soccer subplot ended "perfectly" and said, "Watching [Michael's] fears bubble beneath the surface and slowly erode Pam's confidence was a masterwork."

Travis Fickett of IGN said he was happy with the new, unpredictable direction The Office was taking. He particularly praised the Michael/Pam relationship in the episode, as well as soccer subplot involving Jim and Charles and the return of Ryan; he said Ryan's new bleached blond hair and his theft of bowling shoes were particularly funny moments. Will Leitch of New York magazine said the episode has provided a change the show needed, and said, "Considering how unlikely it was that The Office was going to allow Michael and Pam to degrade into homelessness and squalor, the show has handled the predictable transition as well as possible." Keith Phipps of The A.V. Club said the episode included a good exploration of Michael and Pam's relationship; he said "they're weirdly good together". Phipps, who gave the episode an A− grade, also said the Dunder Mifflin material worked well, "although Idris Elba has been so good at portraying a heartless professional it almost doesn’t seem right for anything to break through his icy exterior."

Margaret Lions of Entertainment Weekly said the episode had "strong moments, and some interesting character play [but] I didn't get quite the same buzz from this week's installments as I did from the previous episode." She said "Dream Team" lacks the usual group interactions between the office co-workers, which she said are normally the funniest parts of the show. However, she praised Michael's pep talk to Pam in the final scene, and said the episode was "the best showcase Jenna Fischer has had in years". Entertainment Weekly listed Michael's pep talk to Pam at the end of the episode as one of the 13 highlights from that week in television.

In her list of the top ten moments from the fifth season of The Office, phillyBurbs.com writer Jen Wielgus ranked Michael's formation of the Michael Scott Paper Company in the downstairs storage closet as number one, citing the "Dream Team", "Michael Scott Paper Company" and "Heavy Competition" episodes in particular. She also said she specifically enjoyed the attempt to solicit investments at the retirement home from "Dream Team". Ryan's return to the series, along with his brief return as a temp in the episode "Weight Loss", ranked number 5 in that list. "Dream Team" was voted the fifteenth-highest-rated episode out of 26 from the fifth season, according to an episode poll at the fansite OfficeTally; the episode was rated 8.00 out of 10.

Claire Scanlon received a Primetime Emmy Award nomination for Outstanding Single-Camera Picture Editing for a Comedy Series. "Dream Team" accounted for one of the ten Primetime Emmy Award nominations The Office received for the show's fifth season at the 61st Primetime Emmy Awards, which were held on September 20, 2009.
