= Booze Cruise (The Office) =

- The Office episode
- Episode no.: Season 2 Episode 11
- Directed by: Ken Kwapis
- Written by: Greg Daniels
- Cinematography by: Randall Einhorn
- Editing by: Dean Holland
- Production code: 2013
- Original air date: January 5, 2006
- Running time: 22 minutes

Guest appearances
- David Denman as Roy Anderson; Amy Adams as Katy Moore; Leslie David Baker as Stanley Hudson; Brian Baumgartner as Kevin Malone; Kate Flannery as Meredith Palmer; Mindy Kaling as Kelly Kapoor; Angela Kinsey as Angela Martin; Oscar Nunez as Oscar Martinez; Phyllis Smith as Phyllis Lapin; Rob Riggle as Captain Jack; Craig Robinson as Darryl Philbin; Brenda Withers as Brenda Matlowe

Episode chronology
| ← Previous "Christmas Party" | Next → "The Injury" |
- The Office (American season 2)

"Booze Cruise" is the eleventh episode of the second season of the American comedy television series The Office and the show's seventeenth episode overall. Written by Greg Daniels and directed by Ken Kwapis, the episode first aired in the United States on January 5, 2006 on NBC. The episode featured Rob Riggle and Amy Adams as guest stars.

The series depicts the everyday lives of office employees in the Scranton, Pennsylvania, branch of the fictional Dunder Mifflin Paper Company. In the episode, Michael Scott (Steve Carell) brings the office on a booze cruise and plans on doing some "motivational" speaking. After he learns that the captain of the boat has other plans, a power struggle emerges. Meanwhile, Pam Beesly (Jenna Fischer) and Roy's (David Denman) previously stagnant relationship blossoms, while Jim Halpert (John Krasinski) and Katy's (Amy Adams) begins to falter.

The story for "Booze Cruise" was inspired by a friend of B. J. Novak's who had gone on a booze cruise. Novak told Daniels about the trip, and Daniels then proceeded to write an episode about it. The episode featured the third and final appearance of Katy, portrayed by Amy Adams. The filming of the episode was a departure from the norm of the series; filming took place on an actual boat and because of this, many cast members got seasick. "Booze Cruise" received largely positive reviews from critics. The episode earned a Nielsen rating of 4.5 in the 18–49 demographic and was viewed by 8.7 million viewers.

== Plot ==
The Dunder Mifflin staff goes on a cruise on the Lake Wallenpaupack party boat Princess—in January. Michael Scott plans to use the cruise as both a party and a leadership training exercise. Michael repeatedly attempts to give a business lecture in which he describes himself as "captain" of the office, only for the actual captain, Jack, to prevent him from doing so.

To stop Dwight Schrute's incessant criticism of his boat-handling skills, Captain Jack puts Dwight in charge of a prop steering wheel, which he thinks is real. Jim Halpert, who has brought his girlfriend Katy Moore on the cruise, and Pam Beesly share an awkward moment alone on the deck away from their significant others. Michael continually tries to take charge of the event by standing next to the captain and interrupting everything he says. When Michael falsely declares that the ship is sinking as a training exercise, his employees understand Michael's antics and stay put. However, the other passengers panic, one of them grabbing a life vest and jumping off the ship. Captain Jack, who was having sex with Meredith Palmer in the pilothouse, temporarily detains Michael by zip tying him to the railing on the deck outside.

After hearing a war story from the captain, a drunken Roy Anderson is inspired to announce a date for his wedding with Pam. Jim is crushed and breaks up with Katy, realizing that he does not want to be with her. He confesses his feelings for Pam to Michael, who acts surprised and claims Jim hid his feelings well. Michael encourages him to not give up on Pam.

== Production ==
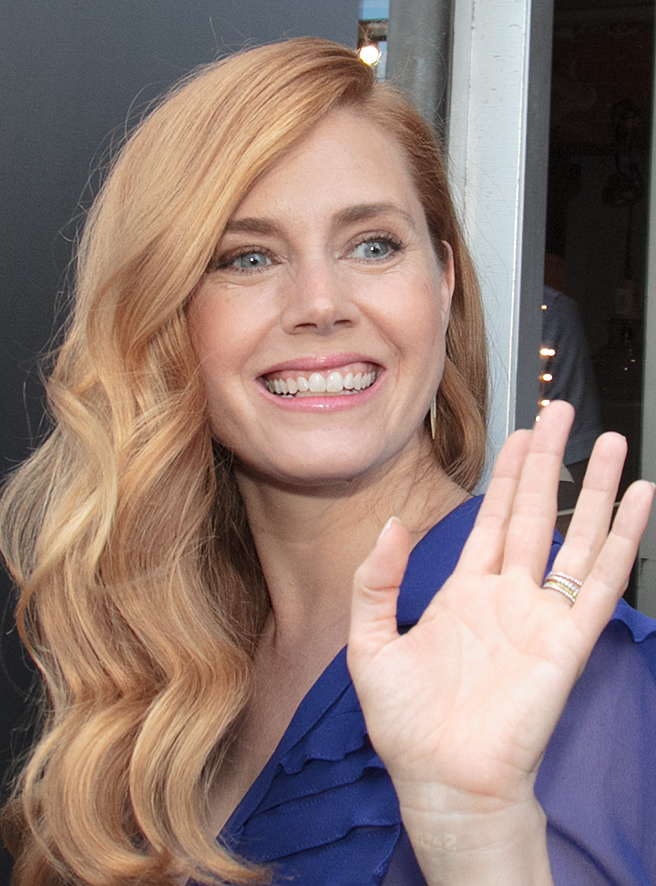
Amy Adams guest starred for the last time in the episode, playing Katy.

"Booze Cruise" was written by Greg Daniels, making it his fourth writing credit, and his second season two credit, after "Halloween" earlier in the year. The episode was directed by Ken Kwapis, making it his sixth directing credit for the series. Daniels referred to this episode as "our Scranton version of James Cameron's Titanic". The idea came from B. J. Novak because a friend of his went on a booze cruise. Novak told Daniels about the trip, and Daniels then proceeded to write an episode about it.

"Booze Cruise" featured the third and final appearance of Katy, portrayed by Amy Adams. Adams thoroughly enjoyed her work on the show. In an interview with Advocate.com, she said, "[The Office] was the best work experience. I loved that show and that cast so much. I don’t know if they believe me, but every time I see them I’m like, 'Oh my gosh, I’ll do anything to come back.'"

Shooting for "Booze Cruise" was a departure from the norm of the series: the majority of the episode was filmed away from the Dunder Mifflin set, and filming occurred during the night, from 6 p.m. to 6 a.m. Principal filming took place in Long Beach Harbor, California. Because the episode took place on an actual boat, many cast members got seasick. Rainn Wilson grew especially nauseated on the second night, and Jenna Fischer and David Denman felt nauseated on the last night of shooting.

During the final sound mixing for the episode, Daniels recalls yelling at the shot of Jim and Pam on deck. He noted that he had "seen it many, many times, but I was yelling, 'Do it, you idiot! Kiss her!'"

== Cultural references ==
During the conference room scene, Michael asks if anyone has seen the 1997 film Titanic. Pam and Jim pretend that they have never heard of the movie, and Pam suggests that Michael is thinking of the 1990 movie The Hunt for Red October. When the employees are boarding the boat, Michael sings the "Ballad of Gilligan's Island", the theme from the 1964 television series Gilligan's Island. Michael assigns the following roles: Pam is Mary Ann, Jim is The Professor, Katy is Ginger, Angela is Mrs. Howell, Kelly is a "native", Stanley is one of the Harlem Globetrotters, Michael is The Skipper, and Dwight is Gilligan. While on the cruise, Michael shouts "I'm the king of the world" referencing Leonardo DiCaprio's character Jack Dawson from the aforementioned film Titanic.

== Reception ==
"Booze Cruise" originally aired on NBC in the United States on January 5, 2006. The episode received a 4.5 rating/11% share among adults between the ages of 18 and 49. This means that it was seen by 4.5% of all 18- to 49-year-olds, and 11% of all 18- to 49-year-olds watching television at the time of the broadcast. At the time, this was the best 18- 49 rating that the show had had. The episode was viewed by 8.7 million viewers. Furthermore, the series retained 87 percent of its My Name is Earl lead-in audience. An encore presentation of the episode, on June 27, 2006, received a 1.8/6 rating and was viewed by over 4.1 million viewers.

"Booze Cruise" received acclaim from critics. M. Giant of Television Without Pity graded the episode with an "A". Michael Sciannamea of TV Squad stated "This sitcom gets better every week" and that "What made this one quite good was that they didn't rely on Dwight too much, although the bits with him 'driving' the boat were good." Monique Marcil of Zap2it said that the "28 seconds of silence between co-workers Jim and Pam capture all the awkwardness and longing of unspoken love better than any words could. And it's these private moments caught on film by the unseen documentary crew that give this otherwise tart sitcom its sweetness." John Krasinski stated that "Booze Cruise" included two of his favorite scenes to film: Jim's conversation with Pam, and Jim's conversation with Michael. He later called both of the shots "beautiful" and noted that it was "nothing short of an honor" to film them with Fischer and Carell, respectively. TV Fanatic reviewed several of the episodes quotes; Steve Marsi rated Jim's quote, "You know what? I would save the receptionist. Just wanted to clear that up" a 3 out of 5. Marsi also rated Jim and Michael's conversation about Pam a 5 out of 5.
