= Arcanum, Ohio =

- Village
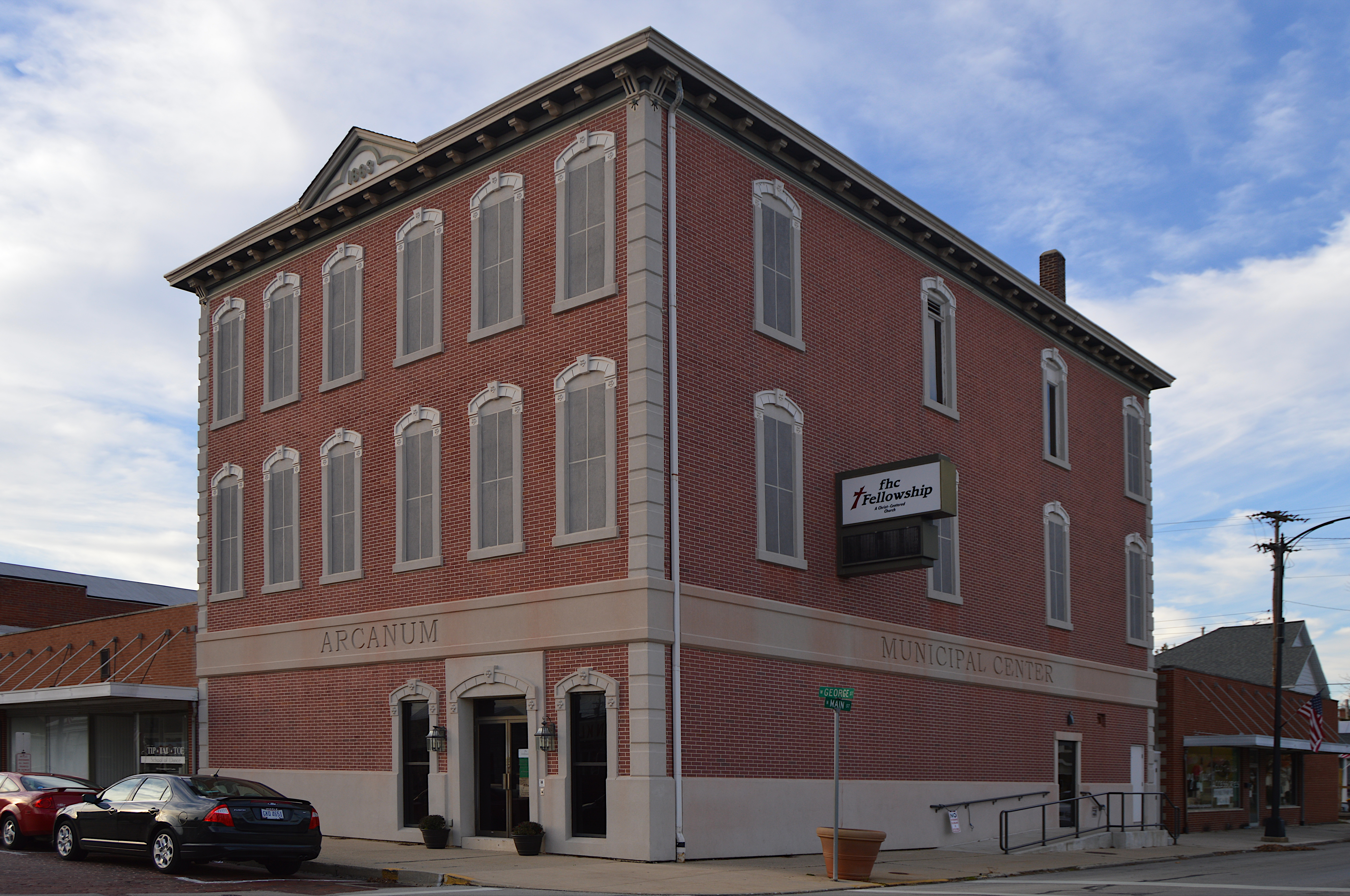
- Arcanum Municipal Center

- Location in Darke County and the state of Ohio
- Coordinates: 39°59′36″N 84°33′17″W
- Country: United States
- State: Ohio
- County: Darke

Government
  - Mayor: Bonnie Millard

Area
  - Total: 1.27 sq mi (3.29 km^{2})
  - Land: 1.27 sq mi (3.29 km^{2})
  - Water: 0 sq mi (0.00 km^{2})
- Elevation: 1,047 ft (319 m)

Population (2020)
  - Total: 2,347
  - Estimate (2023): 2,328
  - Density: 1,845.1/sq mi (712.39/km^{2})
- Time zone: UTC-5 (Eastern (EST))
  - Summer (DST): UTC-4 (EDT)
- ZIP code: 45304
- Area codes: 937, 326
- FIPS code: 39-02330
- GNIS feature ID: 2397978
- Website: http://villageofarcanum.com/

Arcanum (/ɑːrˈkænəm/ ar-CAN-əm) is a village in Darke County, Ohio, United States. The population was 2,457 at the 2020 census.

== History ==
Arcanum was laid out in 1849. The Greenville and Miami railroad arrived to Arcanum in 1852, connecting it to Dayton and much of the outside world. This helped contribute to the majority of its economic prosperity. Arcanum received its name in November 1848 when two engineers were given the task by John Gunder. Gunder instructed the men to "select a name and have one that is not on the map of the globe." Between the first requirement and the dark, foggy November weather, the men chose "Arcanum," which conveniently means "secret, hidden." A post office has been in operation at Arcanum since 1852.

== Geography ==
According to the United States Census Bureau, the village has a total area of 1.30 square miles (3.37 km^{2}), all land.

== Demographics ==
Historical population
Census	Pop.	Note	%±
1870	450		—
1880	778		72.9%
1890	1,134		45.8%
1900	1,225		8.0%
1910	1,361		11.1%
1920	1,311		−3.7%
1930	1,149		−12.4%
1940	1,188		3.4%
1950	1,530		28.8%
1960	1,678		9.7%
1970	1,993		18.8%
1980	2,002		0.5%
1990	1,953		−2.4%
2000	2,076		6.3%
2010	2,129		2.6%
2020	2,347		10.2%
2023 (est.)	2,328	▼	−0.8%
U.S. Decennial Census

=== 2010 census ===
As of the census of 2010, there were 2,129 people, 888 households, and 608 families living in the village. The population density was 1,637.7 inhabitants per square mile (632.3/km^{2}). There were 980 housing units at an average density of 753.8 per square mile (291.0/km^{2}). The racial makeup of the village was 98.8% White, 0.1% African American, 0.2% Asian, 0.1% from other races, and 0.7% from two or more races. Hispanic or Latino of any race were 0.3% of the population.

There were 888 households, of which 35.8% had children under the age of 18 living with them, 53.5% were married couples living together, 11.5% had a female householder with no husband present, 3.5% had a male householder with no wife present, and 31.5% were non-families. 28.0% of all households were made up of individuals, and 13.2% had someone living alone who was 65 years of age or older. The average household size was 2.40, and the average family size was 2.94.

The median age in the village was 37.4 years. 26.5% of residents were under the age of 18; 7.4% were between the ages of 18 and 24; 26.7% were from 25 to 44; 22.6% were from 45 to 64, and 17.1% were 65 years of age or older. The gender makeup of the village was 47.3% male and 52.7% female.

=== 2000 census ===
As of the census of 2000, there were 2,076 people, 853 households, and 603 families living in the village. The population density was 1,789.8 inhabitants per square mile (691.0/km^{2}). There were 891 housing units at an average density of 768.2 per square mile (296.6/km^{2}). The racial makeup of the village was 98.75% White, 0.05% Native American, 0.19% Asian, and 1.01% from two or more races. Hispanic or Latino of any race were 0.39% of the population. There were 853 households, out of which 34.0% had children under the age of 18 living with them, 58.9% were married couples living together, 9.3% had a female householder with no husband present, and 29.3% were non-families. 25.9% of all households were made up of individuals, and 14.7% had someone living alone who was 65 years of age or older. The average household size was 2.43, and the average family size was 2.92.

In the village, the population was spread out, with 26.4% under the age of 18, 8.2% from 18 to 24, 28.1% from 25 to 44, 19.8% from 45 to 64, and 17.4% who were 65 years of age or older. The median age was 35 years. For every 100 females, there were 89.8 males. For every 100 females age 18 and over, there were 84.3 males.

The median income for a household in the village was $42,649, and the median income for a family was $51,429. Males had a median income of $36,850 versus $21,597 for females. The per capita income for the village was $19,597. About 2.5% of families and 3.5% of the population were below the poverty line, including 2.0% of those under age 18 and 5.9% of those age 65 or over.

== Government ==
The Village of Arcanum functions as a Mayor and Council form of government, meaning that the mayor will cast a vote only in the case of a tie amongst the council. The Village Administrator oversees all of the operations of the Arcanum utilities, as well as anything about the water and sewer systems.

== Education ==
The High School Men's basketball team became state champions in 1969.

== Notable people ==
- Linda Castillo, author
- Mark York, actor
