= Michael Scott Paper Company =

- The Office episode
- Michael Scott Paper Company logo
- Episode no.: Season 5 Episode 23
- Directed by: Gene Stupnitsky
- Written by: Justin Spitzer
- Cinematography by: Randall Einhorn
- Editing by: David Rogers
- Production code: 523
- Original air date: April 9, 2009

Guest appearances
- Idris Elba as Charles Miner; Ellie Kemper as Erin Hannon

Episode chronology
← Previous "Dream Team"	Next → "Heavy Competition"
- The Office (American season 5)

"Michael Scott Paper Company" is the twenty-third episode of the fifth season of the television series The Office and the 95th overall episode of the series. It originally aired on NBC in the United States on April 9, 2009.

In the episode, Michael, Pam and Ryan try to get their new paper company off the ground, but end up bickering among themselves due to the stress and cramped office space. Meanwhile, Jim tries to do a "rundown" for new boss Charles Miner without admitting he does not know what a rundown is, while Dwight and Andy compete for the affections of the new receptionist, Erin, played by Ellie Kemper.

The episode was written by Justin Spitzer and directed by Gene Stupnitsky. It included a guest appearance by Idris Elba, who played new Dunder Mifflin vice president Charles Miner. The episode aired the same day as "Dream Team"; the debut episode of the new NBC show Parks and Recreation was shown between the two episodes. "Michael Scott Paper Company" included a new title sequence with footage of the series characters in the new Michael Scott Paper Company office setting, rather than the Dunder Mifflin setting from previous episodes. The episode received mostly positive reviews from critics, although many said it was not as funny as "Dream Team". According to Nielsen ratings, it was watched by eight million viewers and captured the most viewers in its time slot for adults between the ages of 18 and 49. "Michael Scott Paper Company" received a Primetime Emmy Award nomination for Outstanding Sound Mixing for a Comedy or Drama Series (Half-Hour) and Animation.

== Plot ==
Michael Scott, Pam Beesly, and Ryan Howard are struggling to adjust to the work environment of the new Michael Scott Paper Company. The office space used to be a closet; water pipes run through the room, so they can hear the toilets flush from the Dunder Mifflin bathrooms above them. Ryan goofs off and mocks Pam and Michael in their presence during phone conversations. Pam and Ryan bicker over who is responsible for making copies until Michael separates them into corners. Pam, who joined the company as a saleswoman, is given the corner where the photocopier sits. She is concerned that Michael will force her to be the receptionist, which is why she quit Dunder Mifflin in the first place. She asks Charles Miner for her job back, but Charles has already given the job to a new employee, Kelly Hannon, who ends up going by her middle name—Erin—to avoid confusion with Kelly Kapoor.

Michael hosts a pancake luncheon to introduce the company to potential clients, but only one person and a few Dunder Mifflin employees show up. When Michael, Pam, and Ryan come close to giving up, the potential client from the luncheon calls asking for paper. Pam closes the sale and the three cheer in celebration.

In the Dunder Mifflin office, Charles asks Jim Halpert for a "rundown" of his client information. Jim does not know what a rundown is, but is too embarrassed to ask because he has been making such a poor impression with Charles. Jim spends much of the day trying to figure out what a rundown is, chatting vaguely about it with Charles and other coworkers. When he finally finishes what he believes is a rundown, Charles does not look at it and simply asks Jim to fax it to everyone on the distribution list. Jim does not know what the distribution list is either, but rather than asking Charles, he simply faxes the rundown to his father.

Dwight Schrute and Andy Bernard plan a hunting trip, but their new friendship is tested by their mutual romantic interest in Erin. Both make passes at her, but eventually agree their friendship is more valuable than a romantic interest. However, they end up trying simultaneously to impress Erin during a competitive duet of John Denver's "Take Me Home, Country Roads", with Andy on a banjo and Dwight playing guitar; both sing, and Dwight sings part of the song in German. Erin is initially impressed with both of them, but awkwardly sneaks out of the room as they play. Angela Martin is annoyed by Dwight and Andy's budding friendship.

== Production ==
"Michael Scott Paper Company" was written by Justin Spitzer and directed by Gene Stupnitsky and Lee Eisenberg, but for legal reasons directorial credit could only be given to one person, so Stupnitsky is credited as the director per the result of a coin flip. It originally aired April 9, 2009, the same day as the episode "Dream Team"; the debut episode of the new NBC show Parks and Recreation was shown between the two episodes. "Michael Scott Paper Company" was the fourth of six episodes guest starring Idris Elba, best known as Stringer Bell from The Wire. Elba said he did not watch the episode after it aired because "I'm hypercritical about my work, so I try not to torture myself." According to the Season 5 DVD episode commentary, the story idea involving Jim and the "rundown" was added during a rewrite late in production.

The episode included a new title sequence with footage of the series characters in the new Michael Scott Paper Company office setting, rather than the Dunder Mifflin setting from the previous episodes.

To emphasize the theme of a woman coming between two friends, whenever possible shots were framed with Erin appearing between Dwight and Andy. Rainn Wilson and Ed Helms practiced the guitar competition in Helms' trailer during lunch the day of the filming; Helms, a proficient bluegrass banjo player, coached Wilson, who is proficient at guitar and drums. Wilson said he proposed doing a full studio cover of the song, with Creed Bratton providing backup guitar and vocals, and selling it on iTunes for charity. Helms said he was happy to have the opportunity to play banjo on screen, but did not feel the instrument made much sense for his character; Helms said, "It's so fun and weird, but he's a Connecticut preppy guy. How did he pick up a banjo? It's one of Andy's many mysteries, not all of which I even understand."

Prior to the episode's airing, NBC set up a web site for the new Michael Scott Paper Company at www.michaelscottpapercompany.com, which included a mission statement for the company, photos of the new office space and a downloadable copy of the coupon for "unparalleled customer service" featured in the episode. The official website for The Office included four cut scenes from "Michael Scott Paper Company" within a week of the episode's original release. In one 85-second clip, Dwight and Andy pretend to shoot, stab and throw grenades at each other in pantomime in anticipation of their hunting trip; they pretend to kill Jim and pester him until he plays dead, after which Charles walks in and believes he is napping. A second one-minute clip includes Pam and Ryan fighting around the new office until they are interrupted by a janitor who believes the room is still a closet and leaves water jugs on the floor. In a third, 40-second clip, Jim asks Charles directly what a "rundown" is, but when an annoyed Charles asks if this is "one of your pranks", Jim says "Yup. Boom!" and leaves. The fourth and final clip, which is 85 seconds long, features Andy and Dwight both making passes at Erin; Andy discusses how easy it would be to learn sign language, while Dwight tells her to be careful not to get her hair or clothes caught in the nearby paper shredder.

== Cultural references ==
Dwight and Andy sing and perform the John Denver song "Take Me Home, Country Roads" while trying to impress the new receptionist. At one point, Toby is overheard through a vent discussing and praising the FX show Damages while on the phone in a bathroom. He said it is as good as anything on HBO, a premium television channel known for such shows as The Sopranos, Six Feet Under and The Wire. During the workday, Ryan watches a YouTube video of a rap music commercial for Flea Market Montgomery; the low-budget rap music advertisement for the Montgomery, Alabama flea market gained Internet fame. Michael uses Evite, social-planning website for creating online invitations, to invite people to his pancake luncheon. On a whiteboard, Michael writes a quote of himself quoting Wayne Gretzky, the popular ice hockey player who said "You miss 100% of the shots you don't take." The new paper company office included Apple computers and a Nerf basketball hoop. During a phone conversation, Ryan said he wants an iPod music player that also serves as a phone, but not an iPhone, which is essentially that very product; both items are Apple products. Michael listens to "Just Dance", a Lady Gaga song, while driving his convertible to work, which he mistakes for a Britney Spears song. Near the end of the episode, when Andy states that every song sounds better a cappella, Dwight asks about the songs "Cherry Pie" by Warrant, "Enter Sandman" by Metallica and "Rebel Yell" by Billy Idol.

== Reception ==
In its original American broadcast on April 9, 2009, "Michael Scott Paper Company" was watched by 8 million overall viewers, according to Nielsen ratings. The episode earned more ratings than "Dream Team", the other Office episode of the night, which had 7.2 million viewers. It also performed better than the Parks and Recreation pilot, which ran between the two Office episodes and had 6.8 million viewers. "Michael Scott Paper Company", as well as "Dream Team", had the most viewers in its time slot among adults between the ages of 18 and 49.

The episode received mostly positive reviews. Travis Fickett of IGN said this and other recent episodes are "proving that the show has plenty of life in it and [that] The Office has still got it." He said the funniest element of the show was the emerging "bro-mance" between Dwight and Andy. Will Leitch of New York magazine said, "The Office kind of needed this sort of shake-up, even if it's something as simple as another room to put all our characters in." Keith Phipps of The A.V. Club said he liked the plot aspects involve the new company, particularly the pancake breakfast and the first successful sales call: "I know the series probably has to revert to something like the old status quo at some point, but I almost wish it could stay in that dank little corner a little longer." Phipps, who gave the episode a B+ grade, said the "rundown" subplot between Jim and Charles was a bit strained by the end. Steven Mullen of The Tuscaloosa News called the episode "stellar" and particularly praised the comedic chemistry between Andy and Dwight.

Alan Sepinwall of The Star-Ledger said he was enjoying the new paper company storyline, but that "Michael Scott Paper Company" was not as funny as "Dream Team", which aired the same day. Sepinwall praised particular scenes such as Dwight and Andy's competitive duet and Kelly's plan to make Charles want her. He criticized the cramped new office space jokes as being less funny than those in previous episodes. Sepinwall also said the storyline between Jim and Charles was getting repetitive and, "It would help if the writers ever gave Idris Elba something funny to do." Margaret Lions of Entertainment Weekly said, "This episode wasn't one of my favorites … No bombs, no bits that failed, and by The Office's standards, nothing even particularly cringe worthy. But 'TMSPC' is more groundwork than payoff." She said Dwight's rendition of "Take Me Home, Country Roads" in German was "the absolute funniest moment of the episode".

In her list of the top ten moments from the fifth season of The Office, phillyBurbs.com writer Jen Wielgus ranked Michael's formation of the Michael Scott Paper Company in the downstairs storage closet as the number one, citing the "Dream Team", "Michael Scott Paper Company" and "Heavy Competition" episodes in particular. She also said she specifically enjoyed the paper-shaped pancakes from "Michael Scott Paper Company". "Michael Scott Paper Company" was voted the twelfth highest-rated episode out of 26 from the fifth season, according to an episode poll at the fansite OfficeTally; the episode was rated 8.27 out of 10.

This episode received a Primetime Emmy Award nomination for Outstanding Sound Mixing for a Comedy or Drama Series (Half-Hour) and Animation. "Michael Scott Paper Company" accounted for one of the ten Primetime Emmy Award nominations The Office received for the show's fifth season at the 61st Primetime Emmy Awards, which were held on September 20, 2009.
