= Mark York =

American actor (1965–2021)

- Born: November 27, 1965; Arcanum, Ohio, U.S.
- Died: May 19, 2021 (aged 55); Dayton, Ohio, U.S.
- Other name: Marcus A. York
- Occupation: Actor

Mark York (November 27, 1965 – May 19, 2021), also known as Marcus A. York, was an American actor best known for his role as Billy Merchant in NBC's The Office. He also had roles in CSI: NY, 8 Simple Rules, and A.I. Artificial Intelligence (2001).

== Early life ==
Mark York, also known as Marcus A. York, was born on November 27, 1965, in Arcanum, Ohio. He was raised in Ohio and graduated from Arcanum High School in 1986. In 1993, he was accepted into Anderson University in Indiana. While attending university, he appeared as an extra in the film Going All the Way (1997). He graduated in 1997 with three majors in psychology, sociology, and social work. In July 1999, York moved to Hollywood, California to pursue an acting career.

== Career ==
York was best known for his role as Billy Merchant, the no-nonsense building manager for the Scranton business park, in NBC's The Office and appeared in four episodes. He first played Merchant in the twelfth episode of the second season entitled "The Injury", and later reprised the role in that season's finale episode "Casino Night". After his portrayal of the character, York received several positive fan letters, who praised his performance as the straight man in a hectic work environment. He reprised the role in two further episodes: "Fun Run" and "Dream Team".

York also had roles in CSI: NY, 8 Simple Rules, Passions, Mind of Mencia, Six Feet Under and an uncredited appearance in A.I. Artificial Intelligence (2001). He has appeared in independent films such as A Man in the Dark, An Unchanged Melody, and Wounded Rose, along with television advertisements for companies like AT&T and Verizon.

York spoke of the need for more acting roles for people in wheelchairs. "If they're not in the script, the casting director doesn't have balls enough to cast someone in a wheel chair," he said. "It's a character type that's not written for a lot, and they don't reflect true America – 20 percent of Americans have one or more disabilities, but yet 0.05 percent speaking roles on television reflect that community."

== Personal life ==
From 1988 until his death, York had been a paraplegic and used a wheelchair due to an automobile accident. He said of the accident, "I reached in my back seat for my gym bag and, with my left hand, inadvertently pulled up on the steering wheel too much." He had been driving 60 miles per hour, and his car hit a ditch, flipped, and landed in a cornfield. He was an avid sports fan supporting the Cincinnati Reds, Ohio State Buckeyes, and Kentucky Wildcats. York served as the Southern California representative for Spinal Cord Injury (SCI) Research Advancement, to help find a cure for spinal cord injuries with non-embryonic stem cells. In January 2010, he and Will Ambler, founder of the organization, met with Kareem Dale, then Barack Obama's special assistant for disability policy and proposed changes surrounding such policy.

He died on May 19, 2021, aged 55, at Miami Valley Hospital, Ohio, due to "a brief and unexpected illness". Montgomery County coroner's office said he died of natural causes. Fellow The Office actors Jenna Fischer, Rainn Wilson, and Angela Kinsey paid tribute. He was survived by his mother, father, and his three brothers.

== Filmography ==
=== Television ===
List of television roles
Year	Title	Role(s)	Notes	Ref(s)
2004	8 Simple Rules	Construction Guy	Episode: "Daddy's Girl"	
2006–2009	The Office	Billy Merchant	Four episodes: "The Injury", "Casino Night", "Fun Run", "Dream Team"	
2006	CSI: NY	Richard Keith	Episode: "Love Run Cold"	

=== Film ===
List of film roles
Year	Title	Role(s)	Notes	Ref(s)
1997	Going All the Way	Soldier with Tom	Uncredited	
2001	A.I. Artificial Intelligence	Flesh Fair	Uncredited	
2007	Fighting Words	Big Al		
