= Initiation (The Office) =

- The Office episode
- Episode no.: Season 3 Episode 5
- Directed by: Randall Einhorn
- Written by: B. J. Novak
- Cinematography by: Matt Sohn
- Editing by: David Rogers
- Production code: 305
- Original air date: October 19, 2006
- Running time: 22 minutes

Guest appearances
- Creed Bratton as Creed Bratton; Ed Helms as Andy Bernard; Rashida Jones as Karen Filippelli; Bobby Ray Shafer as Bob Vance

Episode chronology
← Previous "Grief Counseling"	Next → "Diwali"
- The Office (American season 3)

"Initiation" is the fifth episode of the third season of the American version of The Office and the show's 33rd overall. In the episode, Ryan Howard (B. J. Novak) is taken by Dwight Schrute (Rainn Wilson) on what he believes is a sales call, but instead is brought to Dwight's beet farm for an "initiation." Pam Beesly (Jenna Fischer) is supposed to keep track of Michael Scott's (Steve Carell) productivity, but Michael spends his day waiting in line for a pretzel. Jim Halpert (John Krasinski) steals Karen Filippelli's (Rashida Jones) chair and foils her attempts to get it back.

Written by B. J. Novak and directed by Randall Einhorn, the episode first aired in the United States on October 19, 2006, on NBC. Upon its debut, "Initiation" was seen by an estimated 8.46 million viewers according to Nielsen Media Research. It was positively received by television critics.

== Plot ==
Ryan Howard plans to go on his first sales call with Dwight Schrute. Dwight instead takes Ryan to his beet farm to teach him sales. He leads Ryan through a series of allegorical lessons including planting a beet seed and walking through a field. Ryan, a member of a fraternity in college, accuses him of trying to haze him into acceptance. After Dwight challenges Ryan to wrestle his cousin Mose Schrute, Ryan gets angry and walks out. Dwight apologizes to Ryan and begins to give Ryan serious sales advice as Ryan takes notes. The two go on a sales call which does not work out for them. Irritated, Ryan throws eggs at the building housing the company that refused his sale, with Dwight joining him. Dwight and Ryan then go to a bar and return to the office, where it appears they formed a new bond.

Jan Levinson instructs receptionist Pam Beesly to keep a log of Michael Scott's activity. Throughout the day, Pam dryly notes Michael's antics, including a Bill Cosby impression for a potential customer and waiting in line with Stanley Hudson for a free soft pretzel, while hinting to Michael that he should be productive. After consuming a sugary pretzel, Michael emerges from his office and launches into a hyperactive, sugar-fueled speech before falling asleep at his desk. At the end of the day, Pam realizes that Michael's Cosby impression secured a large sale.

At Dunder Mifflin's Stamford branch, Karen Filippelli discovers that Jim Halpert swapped his squeaky chair for hers, but Jim foils her efforts to switch them back. Karen tries to instead convince Jim to return the chair by agitating the squeak, but Jim retaliates by prompting Andy Bernard to sing in broken falsetto, so she steals Andy's chair. Later that night, Pam answers a call from Jim, who was trying to call Kevin Malone through the office network. The two have a lengthy conversation and reconnect. Jim misinterprets Pam's parting phrase to Ryan as being directed at him, and the two end their conversation, much to their sadness. Stanley counts down the days left until the next free pretzel day.

== Production ==
This episode was the first full episode of the series directed by Randall Einhorn, and also the first time Einhorn had ever directed any episode of a TV show. Einhorn had previously directed all ten webisodes of the spin-off mini-series "The Accountants". "Initiation" was written by B. J. Novak, who also acts for the show as Ryan Howard.

The episode aired after "Grief Counseling", but was filmed before it due to the availability of the beet farm location. Although the idea for writer Michael Schur to be Dwight's cousin Mose had been a joke among the writers since the first season, B. J. Novak pitched the idea when writing "Initiation". In preparation for the episode, Schur grew out his beard for three months. On the days of the shoot, he also wore wool clothes, which was uncomfortable given the high temperatures outside. Mose was based on an actual participant in the UPN reality show Amish in the City. The episode was partially filmed on a ranch owned by Disney, and the production was required to have a professional snake wrangler on site due to the potential for rattlesnake visits to the area. A scene with Ryan and Dwight trying to sell to Axelrod's CEO Steve Axelrod was scripted but never filmed.

Series creator Greg Daniels had wanted to have a lengthy phone conversation between Jim and Pam since before season 3 started production, with numerous writers vying to be the one to write it. Novak intended the various snippets of their conversation to be interspersed throughout the episode in order to convey the great length of the conversation, but thought it worked great when the editors opted to run all the snippets consecutively.

The third season DVD contains a number of deleted scenes from the episode, including Jan telling Michael to record his day on a schedule, Ryan being hugged by Michael before leaving for his first sales call, Dwight using sleight of hand to illustrate to Ryan that "The key is inside you" and "90% of a good sales call is listening", Pam encouraging Michael to focus, Ryan reflecting on his life path, Dwight showing Ryan his family cemetery and introducing his Nazi grandfather's headstone as "a good man... who did some very bad things", and Stanley and Michael eating pretzels together while trading "That's what she said" jokes.

== Reception ==
"Initiation" first aired on October 19, 2006, in the United States on NBC. According to Nielsen Media Research, the episode was watched by an estimated 8.46 million viewers.

This episode was generally well received by critics. Abby West of Entertainment Weekly stated that "one of the many things I love about the show is how current it is. I love the pop-culture references, like Lost's Dharma Initiative, Deal or No Deal, and that soon-to-be classic SNL/Chronicles of Narnia sketch. IGN's Brian Zoromski said that although the episode had "a few hit and miss moments", it "was a very well done episode that carried through on three main storylines" and "began and ended beautifully". A critic from eTV Review said that even if it "wasn’t as good as last week’s episode", it was still "another great one".
