= Heavy Competition =

- The Office episode
- Episode no.: Season 5 Episode 24
- Directed by: Ken Whittingham
- Written by: Ryan Koh
- Cinematography by: Randall Einhorn
- Editing by: Stuart Bass
- Production code: 524
- Original air date: April 16, 2009

Guest appearances
- Idris Elba as Charles Miner; Bob Gebert as Daniel Schofield; Ellie Kemper as Erin Hannon

Episode chronology
← Previous "Michael Scott Paper Company"	Next → "Broke"
- The Office (American season 5)

"Heavy Competition" is the twenty-fourth episode of the fifth season of the television series The Office and the 96th overall episode of the series. It originally aired on NBC in the United States on April 16, 2009. In the episode, Michael enlists the help of Dwight in getting Michael's new paper company off the ground, but the two eventually end up engaging in a war for each other's clients. Meanwhile, Jim pretends to be afraid of his future with Pam to play a prank on Andy, who is still reeling over his recent break up with Angela.

The episode was written by Ryan Koh and directed by Ken Whittingham. It included a guest appearance by Idris Elba, who played new Dunder Mifflin vice president Charles Miner. The episode received generally positive reviews, and was voted the fourth best episode of the season in a poll at the fan site OfficeTally. According to Nielsen ratings, it was watched by 8.24 million viewers, and was the most watched program among viewers aged between 18 and 49.

== Synopsis ==
Michael Scott and Dwight Schrute have secret meetings in the parking lot, where Dwight provides information about Dunder Mifflin so Michael can undercut the company. However, Dwight's loyalty is put to the test as Charles Miner shows more respect for Dwight than Michael ever did. Dwight brings Charles to one of the secret meetings; Charles orders Michael to stop pestering Dwight. This begins a rivalry between Michael and Dwight, and Michael begins to steal Dwight's clients. Dwight asks for a truce and offers to take Michael and his employees out to lunch; Dwight does not go to the restaurant and instead sneaks into the empty Michael Scott Paper Company office, steals everything on Michael's desk (including his Rolodex contact list), and places a dead fish in the air conditioning vent.

Jim Halpert and Pam Beesly are attempting to get bargain deals on wedding plans from Andy Bernard. When Pam turns down his ideas, Andy warns Jim that Pam is acting controlling and cruelly to Jim, in the same way Angela Martin treated Andy, so Jim asks Andy to provide for his emotional needs (as a prank). After Jim feigns crying on Andy's shoulder, Andy blames the office for Jim's emotional troubles and asks them to apologize. Phyllis Vance tells Andy that Jim is just messing with him. Andy does not believe her until he sees Jim grinning through the kitchen window. When Andy confronts Jim, Jim assures him that he and Pam are really happy and that Andy will find someone else one day.

Michael, Pam, and Ryan Howard return to their office and believe they have been robbed. Dwight calls and reveals his treachery. Michael calls Dwight on the phone and tells Dwight he is going to steal his biggest client while he listens. Dwight races to the HarperCollins office, where Michael and Dwight start fighting over the client, Daniel Schofield. Daniel asks for both of their offers via email, and they agree to do so. Before leaving, Dwight looks at Daniel's personal information from Michael's Rolodex card and asks him about his "gay son", which perturbs Daniel. Michael reveals his unusual system where he color codes personal information about his contacts so he knows what not to talk about. Michael laughs with Daniel in the parking lot as Dwight returns to his car alone.

== Production ==
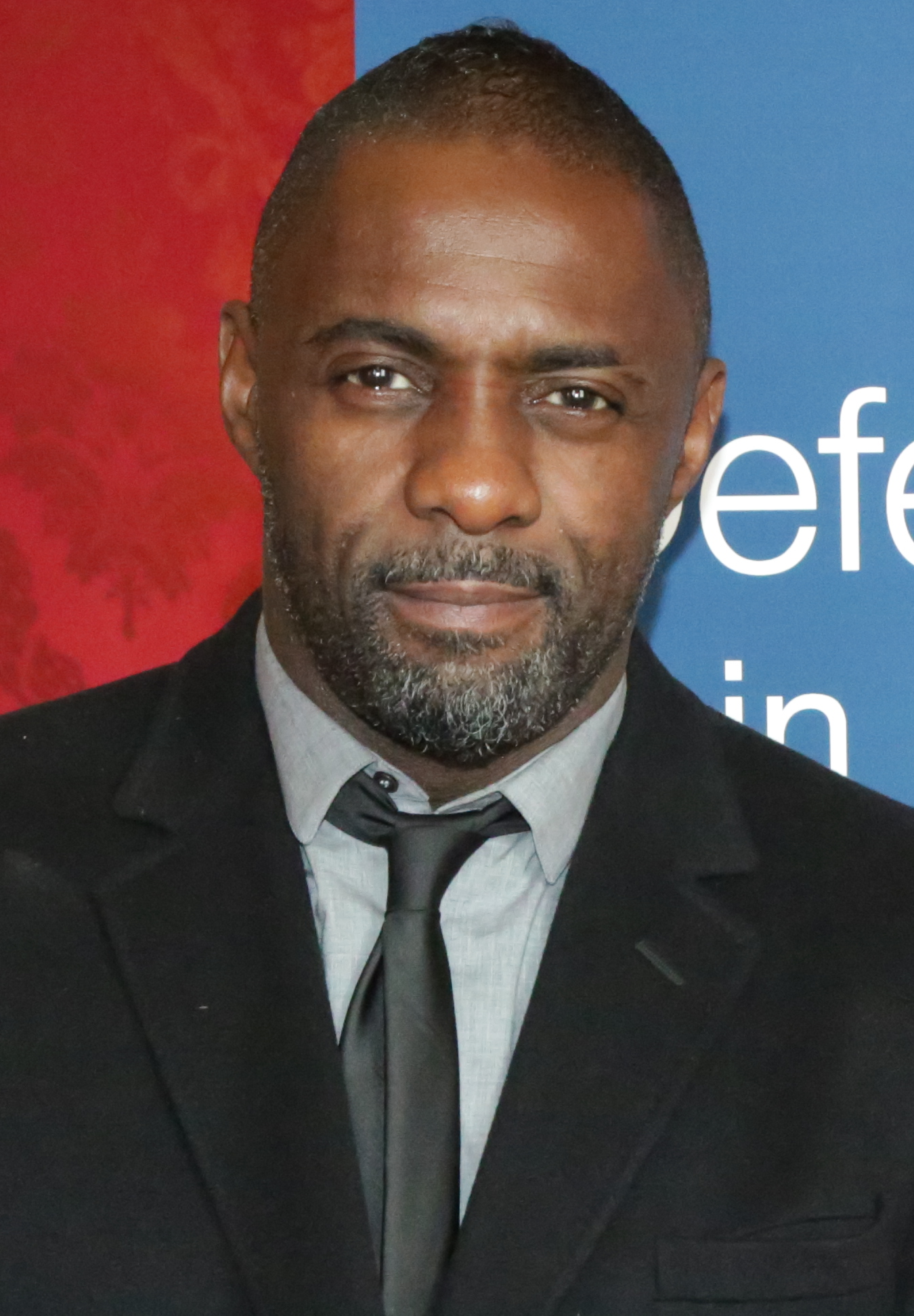
Idris Elba (pictured in 2014) guest starred as Charles Miner in "Heavy Competition"

"Heavy Competition" was written by Ryan Koh and directed by Ken Whittingham. It was the fifth of six episodes guest starring Idris Elba, best known as Stringer Bell from The Wire. Elba said he did not watch the episode after it aired because "I'm hypercritical about my work, so I try not to torture myself." Rainn Wilson said he liked the episode because it demonstrated growth for his character and the relationship between Michael and Dwight; he said "I like the way they let characters grow and change on the show," and said of his character, "It's not the same acolyte ass kissing as season 2". Wilson said the moment Dwight spun around the HarperCollins secretary saying "Spin move", which was included in the script, was one of the most popular moments of the episode among the writers. Wilson said of filming the move, "We did like five spin moves and once I did a somersault. I thought I was being all nimble and quick, but no. I watch it and it looks like a manatee doing ballet at SeaWorld."

Immediately after "Heavy Competition" first aired, NBC created a sub-page on their official "Angela and Andy" wedding site with the full version of Andy's "You Can Call Me Al" a cappella song, as well as an advertisement for their $9,000 wedding performances, both of which were featured in the episode itself. The official website for The Office included two cut scenes from "Heavy Competition". In the first 45-second clip, Michael tries to justify his use of Dwight for leads and Ryan expresses anger when Dwight steals his uncle's dry cleaning company as a client, leading Pam to mock the idea that Ryan cares about anyone but himself and Michael to intercede when Ryan in turn calls Pam a "hag". In the second 50-second clip, Andy tries to sell Jim and Pam a Christian cross-shaped cake from his failed wedding with Angela (as mentioned by Jim in the finished episode), and Jim tells Andy he believes the whole office is against him.

== Cultural references ==
Michael, Pam and Ryan have lunch at Alfredo's Pizza Café, a reference to the restaurant first referenced in the fourth season episode "Launch Party". Andy presents a recording of his a cappella group singing Pachelbel's Canon segueing into the Paul Simon song "You Can Call Me Al". Dwight said under Michael's leadership, the office was like the Roman Empire, the Wild West, war-torn Poland, and Poland all at once. Andy vows to be Jim's "traveling pants", a reference to the young adult novel series The Sisterhood of the Traveling Pants. Dwight describes Charles as "Will Smith-esque", a reference to the American film actor. Michael and Dwight both court HarperCollins, an American publishing company, as a prospective paper client.

== Reception ==
In its original American broadcast on April 16, 2009, "Heavy Competition" was watched by 8.24 million viewers, according to Nielsen ratings. It captured a 5.5 rating/11 share among viewers aged between 18 and 49, making it the most watched episode of the night among that age group. Additionally, the episode captured a 4.5 rating/14 share among viewers aged between 18 and 34.

"Holy smokes, I thought this episode was great: Funny, silly, but substantively grounded in what we know about these characters and our understanding that their world and our world are one and the same. Hear that? It was my satisfied sigh."

— Margaret Lyons,
Entertainment Weekly

The episode received generally positive reviews. Margaret Lyons of Entertainment Weekly said she loved the chemistry between Michael and Dwight, and enjoyed the direction the Michael Scott Paper Company plot was going. She also liked the bond that was forming between Jim and Andy, and said Ed Helms was particularly good in "Heavy Competition". Alan Sepinwall of The Star-Ledger called the episode "just an awful lot of fun", and wrote having Michael and Dwight at odds with each other "forced both characters to be just human enough for the story and the jokes to breathe". Sepinwall did not enjoy the Jim and Andy subplot, except for the final moment when Jim comforted Andy. Will Leitch of New York magazine said, "This might have been the funniest Rainn Wilson has been in an episode all season, and that's saying something." Leitch also said B. J. Novak was particularly funny, and said he enjoyed being reminded that Michael is an excellent salesman.

Travis Fickett of IGN said the new paper company continued to serve as a good change for the series, and the Michael and Dwight rivalry was a "fun development, and it feels as though the writers are taking great advantage of the [storyline]". Steve Mullen praised the episode not only for the Michael/Dwight war, but also for smaller moments like the cheese puff tosses and the messages Pam and Ryan wrote on a clipboard for Michael during his phone call; Mullen said, "I'm not sure any other 30 minute comedy currently on TV can even touch The Office." Amy Stetts of The Express-Times said the Michael Scott Paper Company plot "peaked" with this episode, and she genuinely could not predict how the storyline would end.

Not all reviews were positive. Although Nathan Rabin of The A.V. Club said the cheese puffs scene was "one of the most awesome cold opens in recent memory", he also said "Heavy Competition" was "one of the weakest episodes of the Idris Elba cycle". Rabin also said Jim's treatment of Andy was mean-spirited and unfunny: "Jim tried to spin it into a character-building lesson for Andy but it left a bad taste all the same."

In her list of the top ten moments from the fifth season of The Office, phillyBurbs.com writer Jen Wielgus ranked Michael's formation of the Michael Scott Paper Company in the downstairs storage closet as number one, citing the "Dream Team", "Michael Scott Paper Company" and "Heavy Competition" episodes in particular. She also said she specifically enjoyed the cheese puff tossing scene, and the moment when Dwight dropped his clothes to show he was not wearing a wire, both scenes from "Heavy Competition". "Heavy Competition" was voted the fourth highest-rated episode out of 26 from the fifth season, according to an episode poll at the fansite OfficeTally; the episode was rated 8.66 out of 10.
