= The Injury =

- The Office episode
- Episode no.: Season 2 Episode 12
- Directed by: Bryan Gordon
- Written by: Mindy Kaling
- Cinematography by: Randall Einhorn
- Editing by: Dean Holland
- Production code: 2011
- Original air date: January 12, 2006
- Running time: 22 minutes

Guest appearances
- Leslie David Baker as Stanley Hudson; Brian Baumgartner as Kevin Malone; Kate Flannery as Meredith Palmer; Angela Kinsey as Angela Martin; Oscar Nunez as Oscar Martinez; Phyllis Smith as Phyllis Lapin; Marcus A. York as Billy Merchant

Episode chronology
← Previous "Booze Cruise"	Next → "The Secret"
- The Office (American TV series) season 2

"The Injury" is the twelfth episode of the second season of the American comedy television series The Office and the show's eighteenth episode overall. The episode was written by Mindy Kaling, who also acts in the show as Kelly Kapoor, and directed by Bryan Gordon. "The Injury" first aired in the United States on January 12, 2006, on NBC. The episode guest starred Marcus York as Billy Merchant.

The series depicts the everyday lives of office employees in the Scranton, Pennsylvania branch of the fictional Dunder Mifflin Paper Company. In the episode, Michael Scott (Steve Carell) accidentally burns his foot on his George Foreman Grill, but insists on coming to work anyway. When none of his employees, except for Dwight Schrute (Rainn Wilson), help him, Michael feels under-appreciated. Meanwhile, Dwight starts acting strangely nice to everyone, especially Pam Beesly (Jenna Fischer).

"The Injury" was originally conceived by Greg Daniels to be a humorous follow-up to the previous episode, "Booze Cruise". According to B. J. Novak, the episode started out as an idea in the writing room that just "spun out of control". The episode was originally going to be called "My Grilled Foot", but it was later changed when the writers decided the name was "too weird". "The Injury" received widespread acclaim from critics and is widely regarded by critics as one of the show's greatest episodes. The episode earned a Nielsen rating of 5.1 in the 18–49 demographic and was viewed by 10.3 million viewers, making it, at the time, the highest-rated episode of the series.

== Plot ==
Michael Scott accidentally burns his foot while grilling bacon on his George Foreman Grill, which he keeps next to his bed. After he makes a distress call to the office, Dwight Schrute comes to "rescue" him, crashing his car into a fence pole en route. Dwight becomes more easygoing and friendly to his co-workers. He and Pam Beesly strike up a friendship as a result.

Michael becomes upset with the staff's lack of compassion towards his "disability". Under false pretenses, he brings in Billy Merchant, the building's property manager who uses a wheelchair, to discuss what it is like to be disabled. Billy leaves after Michael makes several offensive remarks, but not before pointing out to Jim Halpert that Dwight has suffered a concussion from his car crash.

Jim and Michael take Dwight to the hospital. Before they go, Pam bids "goodbye" to the concussed Dwight, aware that she will probably never see the good-natured version of Dwight Schrute ever again. They take Meredith Palmer's mini-van, and as Jim drives, he uses a spray bottle to squirt Dwight to keep him from drinking liquor from a bottle he found under the seat. Jim then turns the squirt bottle on Michael to stop him from wrestling the liquor bottle away from Dwight.

At the hospital, Michael insists that his burned foot is a more serious injury than Dwight's, to no avail. To add insult to over-dramatic injury, Dwight gets in a "that's what she said" joke that makes the doctor chuckle. Jim calls Pam to report Dwight's results. Pam coyly tells Oscar Martinez about Dwight's recovery as a way of getting the good news to Angela Martin, who is between them, as Pam is the only person in the office aware that Angela is Dwight's girlfriend.

== Production ==
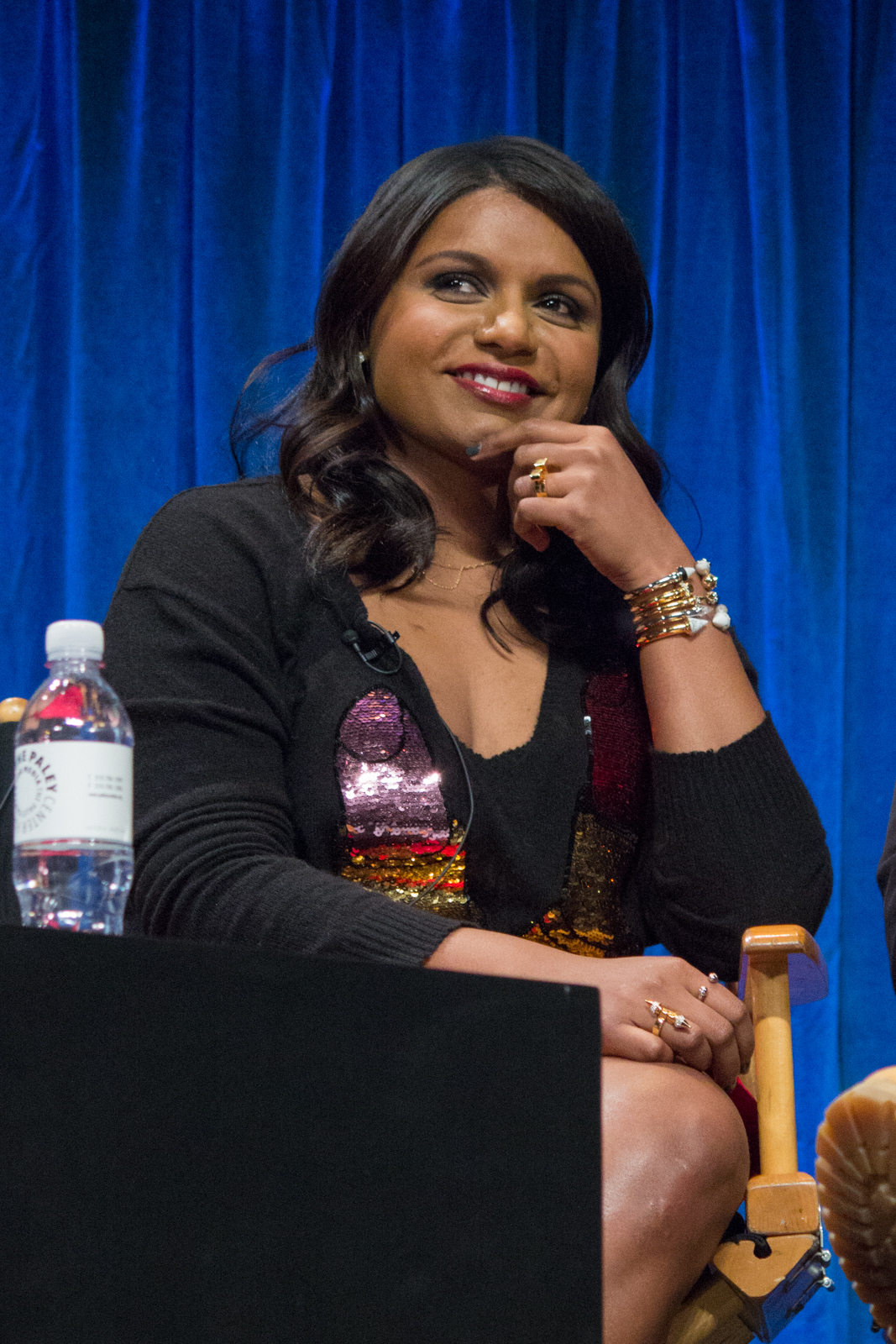
The episode was written by Mindy Kaling, who called the episode her favorite that she had written.

This episode was the second episode of the series directed by Bryan Gordon. Gordon had previously directed the first season episode "The Alliance". "The Injury" was written by Mindy Kaling, who also acts for the show as customer service representative Kelly Kapoor. After the character development that had occurred in the previous episode, "Booze Cruise", Greg Daniels decided to create a more inane episode that involved "Michael's grilled foot".

Writer and actor B. J. Novak said the idea for "The Injury" started out as an idea in the writing room that just "spun out of control". The original plan was for Michael to have fallen asleep in the sun, while having sunblock all over him, except for his foot. According to BJ Novak, the episode was originally going to be called "My Grilled Foot", but writer Mindy Kaling thought it was "too weird for people to tune in and watch that". Novak has described "The Injury" as one of his favorite episodes, and said of it, "I don't think any other TV show would have made an episode from that starting point, and yet it was one of the funniest and most relatable episodes as it went on that we've ever had."

The episode guest starred Marcus York, as the "no-nonsense" building manager for the Scranton business park. York described his character as "just trying to do his job". York recalls being nervous during filming, and "drawing a blank" on his lines during the first 'run-through', because of his anxiousness around the cast members, but soon Marcus "smoothed-out". After his portrayal of the character, York received several positive fan letters, who praised his performance as the straight man in a hectic work environment. John Krasinski said that the van scene was his favorite to shoot, and that it "will go down in history as one of the most fun moments I've ever been a part of".

Cut scenes from the episode include Ryan forging a handicapped parking permit at Michael's orders, Angela mistaking the smell of Michael applying butter to his burn for freshly made popcorn, and Dwight running the photocopy machine with the lid raised and the document he intended to copy still clutched in his hands.

== Cultural references ==
Michael reveals that he burned his foot on a George Foreman Grill, a product promoted by George Foreman, a former champion boxer. The "Prism DuroSport" that Pam received from Roy as a Christmas present serves as a knock off of the popular music device, the iPod. When Michael asks the office what his foot looks like, Stanley replies, "Mail Boxes Etc.", a reference to the name of a company absorbed by UPS in 2001.

During Michael's seminar on famous disabled people, two pictures on the wall are of Tom Hanks: one from the 1994 film Forrest Gump, and one from the 1988 film Big, which Michael confuses for the 1993 film Philadelphia. During the scene, Kelly also name-drops Robert Loggia. In an attempt to get Dwight into Meredith's van, Jim tells him that they are going to Chuck E. Cheese, to which Michael replies that he is "so sick of" the restaurant.

== Reception ==
"The Injury" originally aired on NBC in the United States on January 12, 2006. The episode received a 5.1 rating/12% share among adults between the ages of 18 and 49. This means that it was seen by 5.1% of all 18- to 49-year-olds, and 12% of all 18- to 49-year-olds watching television at the time of the broadcast. The episode ranked as the third half-hour comedy during the week of January 16, and the series ranked as the fifteenth-highest-rated series out of 113 others, in the 18–49 demographic. The episode was viewed by 10.3 million viewers, making it the highest-rated episode of The Office at the time, beating the series' pilot, which received a Nielsen rating of only 5.0.

An encore presentation of the episode, on July 5, 2006, received a 1.8/6 rating and was viewed by over 3.9 million viewers: an increase by 29 percent of its lead-in audience. Another encore presentation on August 22, 2006, received a 2.0/6 rating, was viewed by 5.3 million viewers, retained 100 percent of its lead-in My Name Is Earl audience, and ranked as the most-watched episode of The Office during the summer of 2006.

Since its airing, "The Injury" has received critical acclaim from television critics. The scene featuring Dwight crashing his car received specific attention. IGN ranked the scene with Dwight getting in a car accident as its seventh-best moment in the first two seasons, noting that "[t]he fact that this show can get such inspired and unusual comedy from what is essentially a puke joke is a testament to how clever The Office is." Rolling Stone named the same scene as the twentieth-funniest in The Office's first three seasons. TV Squad's Michael Sciannamea said that "The Injury" was "another solid episode" and that the "show gets better with each and every week". M. Giant of Television Without Pity graded the episode with an "A−". Francis Rizzo III from DVD Talk wrote positively of the episode and praised the performance of Rainn Wilson as Dwight and wrote that "nothing he does compares" to his performance in "The Injury". He called Wilson's performance as Dwight "flat-out strange" and noted that the episode, along with several others, "wouldn't be nearly as entertaining" without his character. Mindy Kaling later stated in an interview that it was her favorite episode of the show that she had written. She later expanded that the entry's "full-on loopy" quality made it humorous. She noted that the episode was "so funny to me, because what happened to [Michael] is so stupid".
