= Michael Scott (The Office) =

Fictional character in NBC's The Office

- The Office character
- Steve Carell as Michael Scott in The Office
- First appearance: "Pilot" (2005)
- Last appearance: "Finale" (2013)
- Created by: Greg Daniels; Ricky Gervais; Stephen Merchant
- Based on: David Brent (British counterpart)
- Portrayed by: Steve Carell

In-universe information
- Full name: Michael Gary Scott
- Occupation: Scranton regional manager at Dunder Mifflin
- Family: Barbara Kevis (grandmother) (Note: Seen in "Dream Team"); Luke Cooper (nephew) (Note: Seen in "Nepotism"); Jeff (stepfather)
- Spouse: Holly Flax
- Significant others: Jan Levinson; Carol Stills; Helene Beesly; Donna Newton
- Children: 4 (with Holly Flax)
- Origin: Scranton, Pennsylvania, U.S.
- Nationality: American
- Date of Birth: March 15, 1965

Michael Gary Scott is a fictional character in the NBC sitcom The Office, portrayed by Steve Carell. Michael is the regional manager of the Scranton, Pennsylvania branch of Dunder Mifflin, a paper company, for the majority of the series. Like his counterpart in the original British version of the show, David Brent, he is characterized as a largely incompetent, unproductive, unprofessional boss, though he is depicted as kinder and occasionally shown to be effective at his job in key moments.

Towards the end of the seventh season, he marries human resources representative Holly Flax and moves to Colorado with her in "Goodbye, Michael", an extended episode. He is then absent from the series until the finale.

Carell received significant critical acclaim for his performance. He won the Golden Globe Award for Best Actor – Television Series Musical or Comedy and received six consecutive nominations both for the Primetime Emmy Award for Outstanding Lead Actor in a Comedy Series and the Actor Award for Outstanding Performance by a Male Actor in a Comedy Series.

== Casting ==
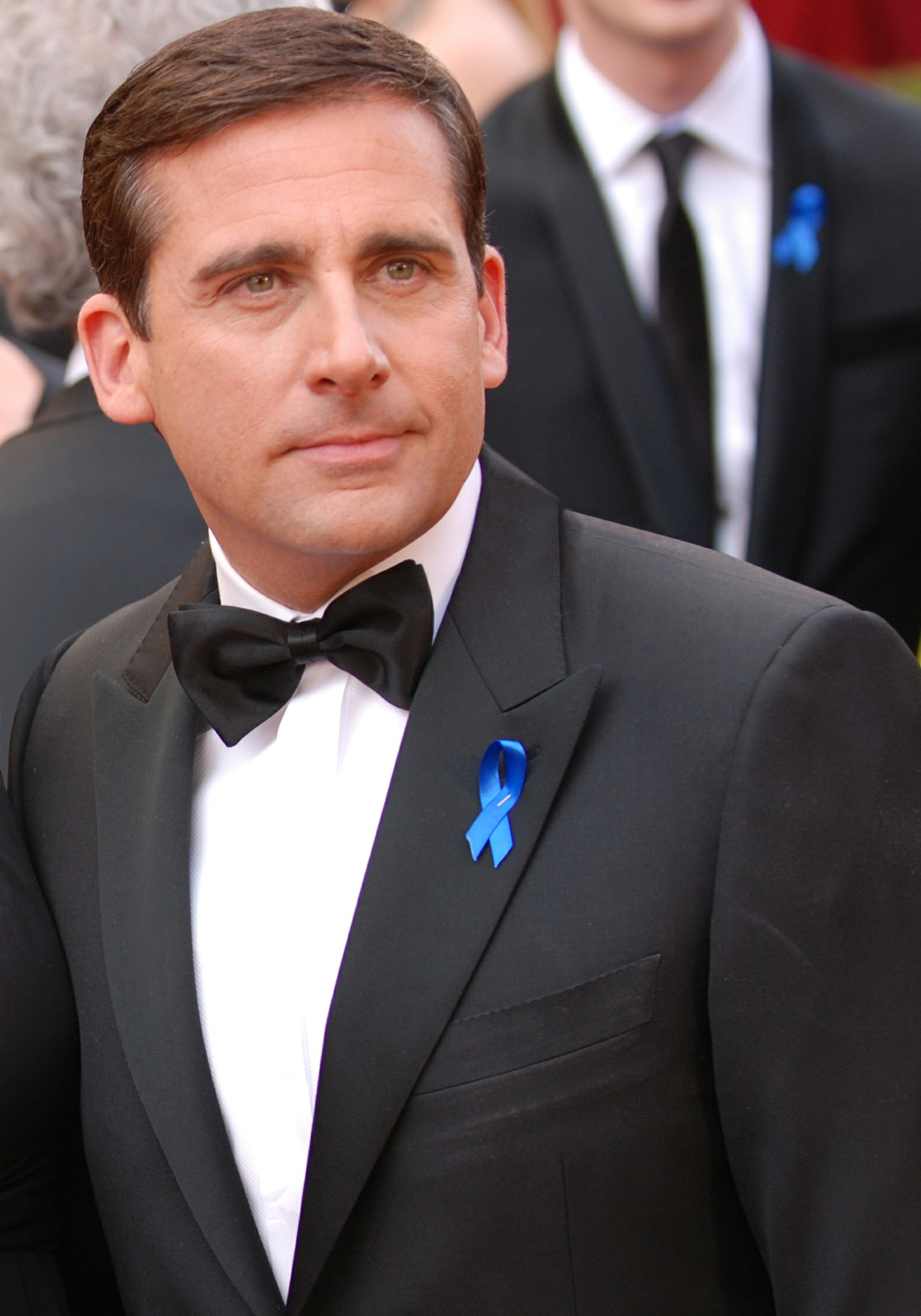
Steve Carell portrayed Michael Scott in the American rendition of The Office.

All original series characters were adapted for the American version. NBC programmer Tracy McLaughlin suggested Paul Giamatti to producer Ben Silverman for the role of Michael Scott, but the actor declined. Martin Short, Hank Azaria, and Bob Odenkirk were also reported to be interested, with Odenkirk auditioning. Silverman offered the role to Ricky Gervais, who played David Brent in the British version, but he declined as he felt it didn't make any sense and didn't want to move to America. In January 2004, Variety reported that Steve Carell of the popular Comedy Central program The Daily Show with Jon Stewart was in talks for the role. At the time, he was already committed to another NBC mid-season replacement comedy, Come to Papa.

With Carell unavailable, Odenkirk was selected as Michael Scott and was part of the cast presented to NBC executives. Paul Rudd advised Carell that the American version of The Office would never be as good as the British version. However, Come to Papa was quickly cancelled, allowing Carell to commit to The Office. Odenkirk went on to appear in the series in a brief role as an office manager reminiscent of Scott. Carell later said that he had seen only about half of the original pilot episode of the British series before he auditioned, and that he did not continue watching for fear that he would start copying Gervais's characterizations. On the audio commentary of the pilot episode, director Ken Kwapis says that Carell's unfamiliarity with the British version of The Office and their experience working together on Watching Ellie influenced his being cast as Scott.

Stanley Tucci, Philip Seymour Hoffman, Bruno Kirby, Tim Blake Nelson, Stephen Colbert, David Herman, Mike White, Greg Kinnear, David Cross, Rob Schneider, and Noah Emmerich, among others, turned down the role.

Rick Moranis, Dan Aykroyd, Eugene Levy, Dan Castellaneta, David Koechner (who went on to play supporting character Todd Packer), David Arquette, Richard Kind, Robert Townsend, Steve Buscemi, Christopher Guest, Kevin Nealon, Dave Foley, Owen Wilson, Jason Lee, Matthew Broderick, Jon Favreau, William H. Macy, and John C. Reilly were also considered for the role. Louis C.K. and Nick Offerman also read for the role. C.K. was not able to get it as he had a deal with CBS.

Two of Carell's supporting film roles helped get audiences' attention: in Bruce Almighty, where Carell plays Evan Baxter, who gets a humorous comeuppance while co-anchoring the news, and in Anchorman: The Legend of Ron Burgundy, where Carell played slow-witted weatherman Brick Tamland. Although The Office premiered to mediocre ratings, NBC renewed it for another season because of the anticipated success of Carell's movie The 40-Year-Old Virgin, and the series subsequently became a ratings success. Carell won a Golden Globe and Television Critics Association award in 2006 for his role, and received Emmy nominations from 2006 to 2011.

Although The 40-Year-Old Virgin was a surprise success, Carell said in an interview with Entertainment Weekly that he had no plans to leave The Office. However, on the BBC Radio 5 Live Film Review show, he said that his time on the show would probably end when his contract ran out after Season 7. This was later confirmed on June 28, 2010, when he announced that the seventh season would be his last.

== Character details, arc, backstory ==
=== Biography ===
Michael Gary Scott was born on March 15, 1965, in Scranton, Pennsylvania. He came from a relatively difficult childhood of loneliness. In the pilot, he mentions having a brother. Michael had some trouble with his early education (shown in "Dunder Mifflin Infinity") as Michael tells the camera crew he was held back in second grade. In "Diversity Day", he claims to be of English, Irish, German and Scottish descent, and also claims to be "two-fifteenths" Native American. He has also mentioned a stepfather, Jeff. In "Nepotism", it is revealed that he had a half-sister, from whom he'd been estranged for 15 years. After their reunion, Michael hires her son (and his nephew) Luke as an office intern, but eventually confronts him about his incompetent, rude behaviour and spanks him in front of the office staff, causing him to burst into tears and quit.

In the episode "Take Your Daughter to Work Day", Michael claims that he was a child star on a kids' show called Fundle Bundle; however, it becomes clear that he simply appeared on the show as one of many guest children. As the office staff watch an old recording of his episode, the young Michael speaks touchingly about what he wants when he grows up: to get married, and to have "100 kids" so none of them could say no to being his friend. In "The Fire", it is revealed that Michael did not attend college, having lost all of his tuition money in a pyramid scheme.

Michael started at Dunder Mifflin as a salesman in the early 1990s. In "Dwight's Speech", he shows the plaque and certificates he received in 1996 and 1997 for 'Top Salesman of the Year'. Dwight also praised him in a deleted scene from "The Coup" for winning consecutive awards for the best salesman. In "Two Weeks", he claims to have acquired half of the Scranton branch's client base. In "The Client", he impresses his then-manager, Jan Levinson-Gould, by single-handedly acquiring an important client through somewhat unorthodox methods. Pam Halpert and Ryan Howard are impressed watching him make sales and negotiate their contracts for The Michael Scott Paper Company, which he starts when he leaves Dunder Mifflin. In "Koi Pond", Jim Halpert concedes that he might never become as good a salesman as Michael.

During a candid conversation in "The Fire", Michael tells Ryan that he became a salesman because he loved making friends. After being promoted to regional manager at a young age, he continued to treat work-related relationships as personal friendships, which he acknowledged was complicated because his colleagues were lower than him in the workplace's hierarchy. He seems to have few relationships outside the office.

In his interactions with other characters, Michael is oblivious to most social norms. He tends to overestimate his own importance in the eyes of his coworkers, and can't understand why they don't share his enthusiasm for his unconventional ideas and interests. He believes an office should be the "place where dreams come true."

He is loyal to the company and tries to help his employees when he thinks they are having problems. Michael has been at Dunder Mifflin (as of "Michael's Last Dundies") 9,986,000 minutes, which means that he has worked there since April 1992.

Michael's constant desire to be the center of attention often manifests itself in selfish behavior. When he burns his foot in "The Injury", he expects Pam and Ryan to tend to his needs, despite Dwight's much more serious concussion. When invited to "Phyllis' Wedding", he assumes his participation will be the high point of the ceremony. He pouts when he is upstaged by Phyllis' elderly father, eventually giving an insulting, overly familiar toast that gets him banned from the reception. His desire to be liked often leads him to make unwise decisions and unfeasible promises without considering the consequences, only to back out when they result in an undesirable comeuppance. He appears to emphasize moments of sympathy or civility directed at him by his coworkers (mostly Jim) and inflates their importance to compensate for his loneliness.

Michael is irresponsible with his finances, and at one point is so heavily in debt he must take a second job as a telemarketer. Oscar, an office accountant, makes a chart of Michael's spending habits and chides him for spending too much money on things "nobody ever needs", such as multiple magic sets and professional bass fishing equipment. Eventually, Michael is forced to declare bankruptcy.

Due to his lack of common sense, Michael is often the butt of jokes. He is quick to take offense when wronged and his response is often disproportionate to the harm he suffers. Similarly, when he unintentionally offends people, he is remorseful and apologizes; the most notable example is in "Gay Witch Hunt", when he cries after realizing his use of the term "faggy" hurt Oscar's feelings. Even though he is often oblivious to criticism, derision and sarcasm, there are limits to his patience—for example, when he demands professional respect from Stanley Hudson in "Did I Stutter?", and defends Holly against the staff's criticism in "Business Ethics".

In "The Meeting", it is shown that Michael does not always consider his employees' success, or even his own, when he sabotages Jim with a bad recommendation, mistakenly believing Jim's promotion would lead to Michael's firing. He does, however, concede to a co-managerial position with Jim to avoid losing him.

A hopeless romantic, Michael has had several romantic relationships, most notably with executive Jan, who becomes so domineering that he ends their relationship. He eventually settles down with Holly, who shares his sense of humor and "gets him". He eventually quits Dunder Mifflin and moves to Boulder, Colorado to help Holly care for her ailing parents. In unseen events, they marry and have four children.

=== Interests ===
Michael's desk on the set of the show in 2009

Michael's catchphrase is "That's what she said!", which he utters—even in places such as business meetings and legal depositions—whenever someone says something that can be made into a sexually suggestive double entendre. He finds the phrase so irresistible that in "Sexual Harassment", Jim induces him to say it just seconds after Jan Levinson and a corporate lawyer specifically asks him to stop.

Michael has diverse interests in media. Song parody writing is often referred to: In "Goodbye, Toby", he relates the titles of two of his songs, "Beers in Heaven" (a "Tears In Heaven" parody) and "Total Eclipse of the Fart" (a "Total Eclipse of the Heart" parody), before singing a rendition of "Goodbye Stranger" as a departing gesture to Toby. He performs his parody of "The Chanukah Song" to reflect the Diwali celebration Kelly hosts.

In "Dream Team", he comes up with "Achey Breaky Fart" (an "Achy Breaky Heart" parody) and "My Stumps" (a "My Humps" parody) during a brainstorming exercise. He aspires to finish filming his original movie, Threat Level: Midnight, whose script the staff finds and gives a table reading. After ten years of production, often using areas of the office as sets, Michael screens the completed movie for the staff in the seventh-season episode of the same name.

Michael loves the theatrical stylings of Meryl Streep, describing her in "The Job" as the "best actor around," and mimics her character from The Devil Wears Prada after seeing the film. He loves Wikipedia and YouTube, although he does not seem to understand how they work and thinks they are news media organizations. He also likes the music of Billy Joel and U2, the movies Mean Girls, Million Dollar Baby, Die Hard, and What a Girl Wants, and television series such as ALF, Entourage, The L Word, and Queer as Folk. He tends to be a bit "behind" when it comes to popular culture references, as when he refers to his then-girlfriend Jan's youthful male assistant as James Van Der Beek, or in his numerous ringtones, including "My Humps" and "Mambo Number Five".

He appears to have a history of playing ice hockey and demonstrates his skating talent in "Michael's Birthday". He says that in high school, after his math teacher told him he was going to flunk out, he went out the next day and "scored more goals than anyone in the history of the hockey team." He also invites potential clients to Wilkes-Barre/Scranton Penguins games. He expresses interest in basketball, even though he is terrible at it (seen in "The Fire", "Basketball" and "Goodbye, Michael"). He is a Pittsburgh Pirates fan, and does not like the New York Mets.

His other interests include a pair of Levi's he refers to as "fun jeans", which he has professionally dry cleaned and are the reason he started casual Fridays, his self-bought "World's Best Boss" mug from Spencer Gifts, and Chrysler automobiles. He drives a silver 2004 Sebring convertible for the first three seasons until he trades it in with Jan's Volvo for a shared Porsche Boxster in the episode "Money". After their relationship, he drives a red PT Cruiser convertible and later a newer-model Sebring as a benefit of the buyout of the Michael Scott Paper Company to Dunder Mifflin in "Broke". He enjoys planning fantasy entrepreneurial schemes, such as a men's shoe store called "Shoe La La", and another paper company called simply "Michael".

=== Personality and management style ===
Apart from his masterful salesmanship, Michael is lacking in almost any other skills, management or otherwise. Jim Halpert once made a color graph of how Michael spends his time: 80% distracting others; 19% procrastination; and 1% critical thinking. Jim added that he inflated the "critical thinking" percentage so people could actually see it on the graph. His laid-back approach more often results in lower than expected workplace productivity, particularly when Michael places personal interests as a priority over work (such as his birthday, someone else's birthday, or his various seminars). To avoid being disciplined for his foolish actions, Michael often resorts to scapegoating employees to cover himself. Although his actions often lead to more problems for his employees, Michael believes that Scranton is "the cool, fun branch... like Animal House". He is genuinely upset when the top salesman from the Utica office criticizes the Scranton in a phone call and declares it "worse than Camden".

Although his position as regional manager gives him broad decision-making authority on branch operations, he often places those responsibilities secondary to his desire to be friends with his employees. On the other hand, he also oversteps his authority by hosting events that corporate disapproves of, such as The Dundies and several office parties a year, inducing birthday parties for each employee despite only being allowed the budget for one a year.

Michael exhibits some symptoms of textbook narcissism, such as in the episodes "Diversity Day", "Booze Cruise" and "Phyllis' Wedding". When another person, typically an expert presenter of a specific topic, or another leader requires the spotlight, Michael compulsively seeks to draw attention back to himself. He is insecure whenever other individuals exert authority over him, and often resorts to childish, tantrum-like behavior such as repeating things that have just been said by others, or trying to talk over others so as not to feel like he is being undermined or ignored. In "Christmas Party", Michael flagrantly violates the agreed upon spending limit for the office’s Secret Santa party, and purchases a $400 video iPod. He then boasts about the high cost of the iPod, while maligning everyone else’s gifts.

It is revealed in the episode "The Duel" the Scranton branch is the best-performing company branch, well ahead of Utica and Nashua. Michael is called to corporate headquarters to answer the question, "What are you doing right?" After several minutes of Michael's inarticulate babble, his superiors concede that while Michael is definitely doing something right, they will probably never know exactly what. They send him on a lecture tour to spread his wisdom; instead, he wastes time and annoys the workers who have to listen to his drivel.

Despite his ineptitude, Michael is prone to brief bouts of surprising insight and is shown to have a kind heart as he shows deep, family-like affection towards the people working in the Scranton branch. The staff initially find Michael annoying but he grows on many of them and is given many emotional goodbyes during his final days in Scranton. In the episode "Broke", Michael displays self-awareness of his inability to keep secrets when he, Pam and Ryan all agree not to let Dunder Mifflin know the Michael Scott Paper Company is broke. Moments later he is seen bent over and in a panic when he admits that he's afraid he won't be able to keep himself from letting the truth slip. In the same episode, he displays a remarkable ability to negotiate with Dunder Mifflin and convince the company to hire himself as well as Pam and Ryan back with full benefits.

In the episode "Murder", Jim attempts to confront Michael for wasting time when he has the staff participate in a murder-mystery role playing game. However, he is confronted by an unusually serious and stern Michael, who demands to, "just let them [the staff] have this game". Jim then realized Michael actually was trying to distract the staff from the possibility of losing their jobs after a news article hinted at Dunder Mifflin going bankrupt.

In the episode "Business School", Michael is one of the few Dunder Mifflin employees to show up to Pam's gallery showing. Unlike Oscar and his then-boyfriend Gil, who had shown up and were critical of Pam's drawings (which Pam overheard), Michael immediately marvels at her work and asks to buy Pam's drawing of their office building. In a moment of sincere kindness, Michael tells Pam that he is very proud of her. Pam begins to tear up and hugs him. During "The Seminar", Michael advises a fledgling Andy Bernard to step up and begin selling at a seminar Andy is hosting, in order to boost his sagging sales.

Michael's habits of joking around and treating professional colleagues as personal friends are often inappropriate for management. However, along with his encyclopedic knowledge of the paper industry, it is remarkably effective when utilized to sign clients, as seen in "The Client" and "Heavy Competition." In "Initiation", Pam balks at Michael's sugar-fueled phone calls to a local business, but later realizes that his silly conversation (including a Bill Cosby imitation) helped to secure a major sale for Dunder Mifflin. He remembers people through word association starting with nicknames such as "baldy" and "fatso" which, while offensive to the individuals in question, works to his advantage. Although he is unsuccessful using his sales methods as a telemarketer in "Money", his social interactions with coworkers suggest that he would be a more popular presence in an office of peers as opposed to subordinates.

It is clear Michael loves Dunder Mifflin very much. He has also shown signs of feeling underappreciated, given his long history with the company. In the episode "The Negotiation", Michael discovers that he is making only slightly more money than Darryl, the warehouse manager, despite working for the company for 14 years. Later in the episode he drives to New York and demands a raise from Jan at corporate headquarters.

In the episode "New Boss", Dunder Mifflin CFO David Wallace ducks Michael's calls throughout the day. When Michael's 15-year anniversary party is cancelled by his new superior, Charles Miner, he drives to New York to confront Wallace. Citing his long history of service and many sacrifices, Michael asks that he be treated more respectfully. Wallace, seeing his heartfelt openness, promises Michael his party and pledges to attend. Michael surprisingly recognizes that the CFO is just humoring him, and stuns Wallace by quitting his job.

== Relationships ==
Michael tends to overestimate his importance to his employees, but despite constantly offending some of them, he has a close bond with them. Most of the employees have been the focus of Michael's jokes at one point or another, usually in reference to their race, sex, size, attractiveness, or sexual orientation. Examples of Michael's difficult relationship with his staff include getting slapped by Kelly for being racist, hitting Meredith with his car, getting kicked out of Phyllis and Bob's wedding, and outing Oscar to the entire office without his permission. They are, however, generally sympathetic to his shortcomings and, while regularly losing patience when he interrupts their workflow, often try to assist him with his personal problems.

Michael's relationship with the company warehouse employees is tense. He has a tendency to disrupt their daily work flow, and in a talking head interview, warehouse supervisor Darryl Philbin (Craig Robinson) explains that they have never been able to make a full year accident-free because of Michael's antics. CFO David Wallace tolerates Michael's antics because he values his loyalty to the company, but Michael offends CEO Alan Brand and the rest of the executives during his only meeting with them.

Although many Dunder Mifflin employees are initially barely able to tolerate Michael, they gradually grow to appreciate his sincere intentions, even at times coming to find amusement in his sophomoric humor and behavior; this transition is most apparent in Pam Halpert, with whom he eventually develops a genuine friendship. His co-workers are overjoyed when Michael finds his soulmate in Holly Flax; they participate in his romantic proposal to her and are shown to be emotional at his leaving Scranton to be with her. Jim Halpert even teared up while calling Michael "the best boss [he] ever had."

=== Dwight Schrute ===
Dwight has the most respect for Michael, viewing him as a model for success, and is thrilled when asked to handle any task given to him, however ill-conceived it may be. Although on the surface, Michael usually appears dismissive of Dwight and generally views him as a suck-up, he is genuinely hurt and angry at the few times when Dwight has deceived him, such as when Dwight went over Michael's head to vie for the manager's job or when refused to reveal office secrets to Michael's new company, the "Michael Scott Paper Company". In the episode "Heavy Competition" of Season 5, Dwight takes Michael's Rolodex and finds his own business card, on the back of which, Michael had written (before leaving Dunder Mifflin): "Dwight Schrute, tall, beets".

Michael also cares how Dwight feels about him. After Michael beats Dwight at his own dojo, Michael finds out that Dwight no longer wanted Michael as his primary contact in case of an emergency which causes Michael to promote him from "Assistant to the Regional Manager" to "Assistant Regional Manager", with a three-month probational period. Dwight told Michael in Season 6 that Michael's pathetic career path hurt Dwight and he regretted working for him instead of taking a fast-track job at Home Depot, but they buried their differences later on. When Deangelo Vickers arrives to be the new Branch Manager, Dwight is depressed that he didn't get the job after Michael recommended him, only to learn from Gabe that Michael didn't recommend him after all. At first Dwight is angry with Michael, but they make amends when Michael gives him a letter of recommendation on his final day at Dunder Mifflin. They end the day with a paintball fight behind the building. In the series finale, Michael is the best man at Dwight's wedding after Jim arranges it.

=== Ryan Howard ===
Michael has one-sided affection for Ryan, which often makes Ryan uncomfortable. Examples of this are when Michael gives Ryan the "Hottest in the Office" award in The Dundies, when Michael declares he would definitely want to have sex with Ryan in "The Fire", and when Michael gives Ryan a $400 iPod for the Secret Santa gift exchange, despite the 20-dollar limit. In "The Deposition", a page from Michael's diary reveals he describes Ryan as "just as hot as Jan, but in a different way." On multiple occasions, Michael behaves inappropriately around Ryan, including slapping Ryan's buttocks, pinching Ryan's nipples, staring constantly at Ryan from behind his window blind, pinning Ryan to sit on his lap and making kissing gestures toward Ryan while calling him the belle of the ball.

Michael is devastated when he finds out about Ryan's arrest for fraud, and much to the dismay of David Wallace, he later re-hires Ryan. In "Prince Family Paper", Michael acknowledges that his heart has led him astray before, naming Jan and Ryan as examples of this. In "Dream Team", Michael convinces Ryan to leave his job at the bowling alley and join his newly formed paper company. When working together, Ryan comes to respect Michael's skills as a salesman. In Season 7, Michael heavily invests in Ryan's WUPHF.com and won't agree to sell his majority shares when it is clear Ryan is exploiting Michael's goodwill and is incapable of saving the venture from bankruptcy.

Michael's obsession with Ryan is further shown in a number of deleted scenes. In one from "Diwali", Carol says that Michael constantly talks about Ryan's attractiveness and has begun stalking him. In another from "Safety Training", Michael confesses that he will miss Ryan the most after dying, which angers Ryan. In a deleted scene of "Beach Games", Michael says he especially wants to see Ryan put a hot dog in his mouth. In "Night Out", Michael is in bed with Ryan asking "Do you miss us?," to which Ryan declines to answer.

=== Jim and Pam Halpert ===
Michael doesn't hesitate to compliment or criticize Pam for her looks and he frequently mentions her breasts. In the episode "Diwali" Michael mistakenly thinks that he and Pam have a connection, and is rejected when he tries to kiss her. Throughout their relationship, Pam has served as something of a shoulder angel for Michael by encouraging him to be more productive and discouraging his bad ideas, with varying degrees of success. She grows closer to Michael as he supports her goals in pursuing sales and art. Pam is visibly touched when, after many art show attendees (including Oscar and his boyfriend Gil) dismiss her artwork, Michael is so impressed that he asks to buy her painting of their office building. Their relationship comes to a rocky point when he begins dating her mother Helene. This is only repaired after he breaks up with Helene and allows Pam to slap him in the face in the parking lot. He trusts and respects Jim, although when they were co-managers they clashed due to their polar-opposite management styles. In "Secret Santa", Michael mentions that in a future vision he sees himself and his future wife living next door to Jim and Pam and that their children will play together. He often also refers to Jim as his best friend in the office, although, based on his impersonation of Jim using surfer slang in "Michael's Last Dundies", does not have a very good understanding of his personality.

While Jim and Pam are both shown to care about Michael, his clingy nature makes them reluctant to socialize with him outside of the office; such as when, after numerous unsuccessful invitations, Michael is forced to trick them in order to have them over for a disastrous dinner in the episode "Dinner Party." In a Season 5 episode, Michael also shows his admiration for Jim, when Jim wears a tuxedo to work and goes on and on about having a 'classy party' for the party planning committee, and frequently suggests all of the ideas Dwight had offered that Michael had then rejected, only to bother Dwight by having Michael accept the same ideas from him. During Cecilia Halpert's baptism, Michael approaches Pam referring to himself as "the godfather" while imitating Don Corleone. After Pam sympathetically but emphatically asks him to acknowledge that he won't be Cece's godfather, he is disappointed but does so, and is hurt to learn that the godparents are a couple they'd only recently met. Pam is shown to have a soft spot for Michael, such as when she consoles him after he finds Holly to be in a relationship with AJ, and when she advises him on how to propose to Holly. In "Goodbye, Michael" it is revealed that Michael is secretly planning to leave for Colorado at the end of his penultimate work day, thereby avoiding having to say goodbye to everyone. Jim figures this out and goes along with it, telling Michael that he will tell him what a great boss he was the following day at lunch, which they both know Michael will not be around for; Michael and Jim both get sentimental during this final conversation between them. The strength of his relationship with Pam is revealed as he continuously asks about her whereabouts, not wanting to leave without saying goodbye.

Pam, who spent the better part of the day away from the office, finds Michael at the airport and says goodbye in a touching scene just as he's about to board his plane for Colorado. She watches from the window as his plane flies off. In a deleted scene of "The Inner Circle", Pam is flattered that Michael named his new dog "Pamela Beagsley." Pam later teases Jim that their second child will be named "little Michael Scott" displaying the friendship she had developed with her former boss. In the series finale, Jim convinces Michael to replace him as the "bestest mensch" at Dwight's wedding. Pam is so thrilled to see photos of Michael's children that she does not judge him for paying for two phones to hold all the pictures.

=== Toby Flenderson ===
Despite liking the majority of the staff, Michael fiercely hates Human Resources Manager Toby Flenderson. The origins of Michael's hatred for Toby go largely unexplained in the show itself, although writer/executive producer Paul Lieberstein, who also portrays Flenderson, has said that the genesis of the joke for the writers was in a deleted scene where Toby signs Meredith's birthday card. Within the context of actual aired scenes, Human Resources Manager Toby often has to reprimand Michael for violating company policies, which is consistently a source of friction between the two.

Michael's long-time goal is to get rid of Toby and any attempts at reconciliation between the two usually backfire. In the episode "Goodbye, Toby", Michael is thrilled when Toby decides to move to Costa Rica and gives as his going away present a rock with a note that reads "Suck on this". The next season, after Toby's replacement Holly is transferred, Michael is horrified when Toby returns to Dunder Mifflin. In "Frame Toby", he goes to great lengths to get him fired, trying to frame him for possession of marijuana, and although he later admits his actions to the cops out of guilt when they initially prepare to arrest Toby (indicating his hatred has limits), he ends up hating Toby, even more, when the latter criticizes him for wasting the cops time instead for being framed (it is possible that Michael is disgusted that Toby lets himself be abused). In "The Chump", Michael says if he had a gun with two bullets and was in a room with Adolf Hitler, Osama bin Laden, and Toby, he would shoot Toby twice. In "Nepotism", after Michael spanks Luke, the office intern who is also his nephew, he is ordered to attend counseling sessions moderated by Toby, much to Michael's horror. At first Michael is uncooperative but is gradually tricked by Toby into discussing therapeutic details of his life and childhood. In "Michael's Last Dundies", Michael eggs Toby's house while he and Deangelo are handing out Dundie nominations in the cold open. In "Goodbye, Michael", Michael is seen saying goodbye to Toby without insulting him, possibly indicating that he will miss Toby on some level in spite of his tremendous animosity towards him.

=== Erin Hannon ===
Once Pam is promoted to salesperson following Dunder Mifflin's buyout of The Michael Scott Paper Company, Michael keeps Erin Hannon as her replacement. Michael is initially unkind to her as he misses having Pam as his receptionist, but she is able to earn his respect by cheering him up after his disastrous school visit in "Scott's Tots." Unlike her predecessor, Erin loves working as a receptionist, admires Michael and cheerfully accommodates many of his unusual requests (such as serving him a plate of ants on a log every day at 2:30 and spinning him in his chair until he's dizzy). Although he generally enjoys Erin's thoughtful treatment, his dismissive feelings towards Erin continue until "Secretary's Day" when he reluctantly agrees to take her out to lunch. Erin relishes the opportunity to spend time with her boss, while Michael finds their conversation awkward and mentions that her then-boyfriend Andy Bernard was previously engaged to Angela Martin. Erin was previously unaware of this, and after learning of it she ends her relationship with Andy. Later that day, Michael apologizes to Erin; the two are finally able to relate to each other over their mutual fondness for silly humor, stemming from their similar immature tendencies with Michael's ignorance and Erin's naïveté.

Their working relationship then develops smoothly while they bond by making each other laugh with childish jokes, such as Erin pointing out that the phrase "it's not" sounds like "snot." In "Viewing Party", Erin throws a Glee party with her new boyfriend, Gabe Lewis. Throughout the night, she unsuccessfully attempts to get Michael and Gabe to bond. Michael is jealous that the office looks to Gabe as the boss and attempts to sabotage the party. After being confronted by Erin in private, Michael questions why his opinion matters so much to her as he is not her father. In a moment of insight, Michael realizes that Erin, who was raised in foster care, does indeed look to him as a father figure and he instigates a playful fight as father and daughter by saying "go to your room, young lady!" Erin becomes protective of Michael to the point where she is hostile towards Holly Flax, saying in a talking head interview that she doesn't understand what Michael sees in her, until The Search when she, Dwight and Holly go searching for a missing Michael.

Erin sees that Holly is able to sense where Michael is, and when she sees them reconcile, she finally understands their love for each other and smiles. Later in "Goodbye, Michael", Erin talks to Michael about her love life and wishes that she knew her birth mother so she could tell Erin what to do. Michael advises Erin that she shouldn't rush things and that she'll know what to do when the right guy comes along. Michael then tells her that she won't need her mother for advice, because she will always have his personal phone number when she needs advice and kisses her on the head.

=== Holly Flax ===
Shortly after the dissolution of his troubled relationship with Jan, Michael found love with Holly Flax (Amy Ryan), Toby's replacement as HR Representative, who appears for a while to be Michael's best chance at love, with the two sharing a similar sense of humor and social awkwardness. However, after David Wallace witnesses them kissing, Holly is transferred to the Nashua branch and she and Michael break up after choosing not to pursue a long-distance relationship. Despite the breakup and Holly's new relationship with another man, their affection for each other persists, as it is shown that Holly had been writing a note for Michael on her work computer, as well as their subtle romantic glances at one another during the summer company picnic. Throughout her absence in Season 5, excluding "Company Picnic" and carrying on into Season 7, Michael hooks up with a few other women, but ultimately he finds that none of them compare to Holly.

Around Christmas in Season 7, Toby is forced to leave the office due to being selected as part of the jury duty for a local murder case, resulting in Holly returning as the temporary HR replacement. There is initial tension between the two of them and hesitation on her side (mostly after her sudden break-up with A.J.), but Holly finally reunites with Michael after realizing the two are soulmates. The two continue dating for a few weeks, and on Valentine's Day, they tell each other they love each other, decide to move in together, and resolve that they will not allow Dunder Mifflin to interfere with their future together.

With her time at the Scranton branch almost up and the recent knowledge that her aging parents need to be taken care of, they ultimately become engaged. Holly later moves back to Colorado and Michael follows her soon after. In the finale it is revealed that they have children together. It was revealed in a photo album on NBC that they have three children and are expecting their fourth child.

=== Other romantic relationships ===
Michael's longest relationship before his marriage was with Jan Levinson (Melora Hardin), his original-then-former boss from Corporate. Starting with a one-night stand after they closed their business deal at Chili's in "The Client", Michael and Jan begin awkwardly dating, become an official couple, and eventually move in together after Jan is fired from her job—although Jan usually treated Michael with contempt. After Michael fails to defend Jan in her wrongful dismissal suit against Dunder Mifflin, they remain together for a short while, but end up blowing up at each other during an ill-fated dinner party and eventually break up. He also dated Carol (played by Carell's wife Nancy Walls), a real estate agent from whom Michael bought his condominium. Michael was much more interested in Carol than she was in him, and after he made an unwanted and rejected impromptu public marriage proposal, Michael's decision to Photoshop pictures of himself over Carol's ex-husband in her family pictures resulted in their breakup.

On a business trip to Winnipeg, Michael and "Concierge Marie" become close, and Michael does not wish to leave her after they are caught necking in her suite. After Jim and Pam's wedding, Michael begins dating Pam's mother Helene (much to Pam's horror), but he breaks up with her on her birthday after discovering she is turning 58. Near the end of season six, Michael begins dating Donna (Amy Pietz), the manager of a local bar, but later finds out that she's married and he is, as he puts it, "the mistress". He continues seeing her until the disgust of his employees drives him to listen to his conscience and break things off with her. In Season 7's "Sex Ed", Michael reunites in person or by telephone with all of his past girlfriends when he believes that he has contracted herpes. In doing so, he realizes that Holly was the only one he truly loved.

== Legacy of "That's What She Said" ==
The show often uses the joke "that's what she said", originally popularized by the Wayne's World sketch on Saturday Night Live. In the original BBC version of The Office, Ricky Gervais's character David Brent frequently uses the similar phrase "as the actress said to the bishop" as an inappropriate joke. Michael compulsively inserts the phrase as a sexually suggestive double entendre, finding it amusing in even the most inappropriate circumstances.

The phrase has become so associated with the character that the television show 30 Rock, in the episode "TGS Hates Women", there is a scene where Liz Lemon (Tina Fey) becomes infuriated at another character's use of the phrase, exclaiming, "Steve Carell owns 'That's What She Said,' okay? He owns it!" In the episode "Goodbye, Michael", "That's what she said" is Steve Carell's final line as a series regular; it is also his first line on returning as a guest star in "Finale".

== Comparison with David Brent ==
Although originally based on David Brent, Scott developed into a significantly different character than his British counterpart. Whereas Brent is shown to be irredeemably incompetent in all professional domains, Scott is portrayed as an outstanding salesman who is unwisely promoted to a management role to which he appears completely ill-suited. In a scathing performance review during episode eight of season two, Jan Levinson suggests that Scott should be removed from his management role and return to sales. Scott is thus an apt example of the Peter Principle which states that competent persons in a hierarchical organization will "rise to the level of their incompetence" after which they will not advance.

Despite his failings, Scott has been oddly successful as regional manager. This is attributed, in part, to his weakness of procrastination wherein he typically forfeits a bad choice by seeking the advice of his more competent subordinates (such as Jim, Oscar, or Darryl) and uses their recommendations. Scott's success is also partly attributed to his main strength: genuinely caring about the well-being of the office and treating his employees like family. When he took over the Scranton Branch he decreased costs by 17%, without firing any personnel. After the merger of the two branches Scott does not lose a single client despite a great deal of employee turnover (much of which he was directly responsible for). He received a $3,000 bonus for firing Devon, most likely because his doing so saved the company around $50,000. Although it is suggested that Brent has had similar success, such claims only ever come from Brent himself, thus making them unreliable.

Scott's social immaturity and inability to cope with responsibility is balanced with a personality that is much more caring than Brent's, even if both make unwise comments in the heat of the moment. Unlike Brent, who pretends to be friendly with many of his employees purely for the benefit of the cameras, Scott seems to genuinely like his colleagues, with the exception of Human Resources Director Toby Flenderson, though there are instances of him and Toby getting along and his hatred towards them having limits. Scott's need to be liked by his staff and his belief that people see him as a genuine friend leads him to become very hurt when he realizes this is not the case. Most, if not all, of Scott's managerial blunders can be directly correlated with the degree to which he desires to be liked by his employees or jealously seeks their approval.

The DVD commentary to the pilot episode suggests that Scott's character continues a process begun in the second British series, in which Gervais and Merchant intentionally made Brent less nasty, and more of a buffoon. It is said in the commentary that Gervais and Merchant suggested that this be applied to Scott. This also reflects a general change in the American version's attitude, which is more sympathetic to the characters, and tones down the cruel humor of the original. The commentary also says that Steve Carell had not seen more than a few minutes of the original British series when he was offered the role of Scott and has since made a conscious decision not to watch it in case it influences his own performance. During an interview on Marc Maron's podcast, Jenna Fischer said that, when initially developing the show, Gervais explained that it is much more common in the United Kingdom for people to spend many years working at jobs that they dislike or are unfit for than it is in the United States, which is why Michael Scott is portrayed as being significantly more successful in the workplace than was Brent.

The show's writers have said that the 2005 hit film The 40-Year-Old Virgin provided very useful guidance as they refined the character along with Steve Carell between the first and second seasons. Michael Scott wore a large amount of hair gel and dressed sloppily in Season 1, but by Season 2 he had a more conventional haircut and dressed much more neatly. Also, while Michael is often rude and nasty in Season 1, he is generally nicer and less hard-edged in subsequent seasons.

In the seventh-season episode "The Seminar", Michael in fact briefly meets David Brent in an office lobby and they establish an immediate rapport, joking together and generally signalling that they would have been good friends.

== Behind the scenes ==
- Series creator Greg Daniels envisioned Michael Scott behaving as if he "was hoping that the documentary about this would one day be seen by Jennifer Aniston, and I was just trying to impress her any way I possibly could." On the audio commentary for "Valentine's Day", Daniels notes that he included a meeting between Michael and two other branch managers to contrast Michael's level of competence with theirs. While Michael is not as dynamic as Josh Porter, who is later hired in a senior management position at Staples, his management skills are superior to those of the hopelessly inept Craig. Daniels comments that Michael could be an adequate but unexceptional branch manager who, despite his antics, is just competent enough to avoid being fired.
- Writer B. J. Novak explains that Michael Scott drives a Sebring because it is the most ostentatious car he can afford, opting for a convertible despite the fact that the climate in Scranton is cool even in the summer.
- After the airing of "Garage Sale", Colorado governor John Hickenlooper humorously issued a press release appointing Michael Scott as Director of Paper Distribution in their Department of Natural Resources.
