= Whistleblower (The Office) =

- The Office episode
- Episode no.: Season 6 Episode 26
- Directed by: Paul Lieberstein
- Written by: Warren Lieberstein; Halsted Sullivan
- Cinematography by: Matt Sohn
- Editing by: David Rogers; Claire Scanlon
- Production code: 626
- Original air date: May 20, 2010

Guest appearances
- Kathy Bates as Jo Bennett; Andy Buckley as David Wallace; David Koechner as Todd Packer; Hugh Dane as Hank Tate; Nelson Franklin as Nick; Zach Woods as Gabe Lewis

Episode chronology
| ← Previous "The Chump" | Next → "Nepotism" |
- The Office (American season 6)

"Whistleblower" is the twenty-sixth and final episode of the sixth season of the American comedy series The Office and the show's 126th episode overall. It originally aired on May 20, 2010 on NBC in the United States.

In the episode, the press learns that Sabre printers catch on fire and Jo (Kathy Bates), suspecting that someone within the Scranton branch leaked the information, sets out to discover who the whistleblower is.

It was written by Warren Lieberstein and Halsted Sullivan and directed by Paul Lieberstein. The episode received mixed reviews from critics and was watched in 6.60 million households.

== Synopsis ==
The press finds out that Sabre's printers can overheat and catch on fire. CEO Jo Bennett shows up to the office in hopes of finding out who the whistleblower is. Everyone suspects Andy Bernard, who adamantly denies he leaked the information, even though he was the first in the office to learn of it. Jo has Nick, the IT guy, check everyone's computer to find evidence for a potential leak, and he is constantly harassed while trying to do so. Jo and Gabe Lewis interview everyone as well to find the potential leak, starting with Michael Scott. Although Michael suggests some very harsh treatment of the offender, which proves his innocence to Jo, he insists that no one in the office would have leaked the information.

During the interviews, Dwight Schrute comes in and offers Jo a long list of people she should fire to convince her it was not him. Jo believes him and recommends that he invest the money he made this year in real estate. After a lot of consideration, Dwight decides to attempt to buy the Scranton Business Park, and suggests in a conversation with Hank the security guard that he will implement sweeping changes to the place.

Meanwhile Michael tries to get Andy to confess he told the press. When Andy suggests that Darryl Philbin could be the whistleblower, Michael confronts him. Darryl admits he told a female reporter at a bar after work about the videotaped printer catching on fire. Pam Halpert voluntarily confesses to Michael that she told another mother at the day-care center whose husband is a reporter. He asks her and Darryl to meet him in the parking lot. Kelly Kapoor joins them as she had revealed the news on her various social networking sites. The three suggest to Michael that he should try to talk to Jo about the situation so that they can confess but keep their jobs.

Michael tries to convince Jo to let the offenders off lightly which causes her to suspect that he knows the identity of the leak. Michael refuses to say anything, so Jo takes him to the hangar with her private jet to talk with him about his problems. Michael admits many of the stresses he has had throughout the year, including missing Holly Flax. Jo says that even though she will have to do a recall on the printers, she loathes the thought of having to make a public apology, fearing that is all she will be remembered for after she dies. Michael, who has already been enjoying the media attention over the printers so much that he enlisted the other employees to artificially raise the web counter on TV spots of him, offers to make the public apology for her.

Gabe finishes interviewing everyone and deduces that Andy is the one who talked with the press. Jim Halpert defends Andy, and the office descends into haphazard speculations on the whistleblower's identity. Former CFO David Wallace reveals himself as another leak as he heard about it from a former client and then told other former clients and potential clients out of spite. Nick announces that he is quitting to go teach inner city children in Detroit how to use computers. When Dwight and others mock him, Nick explodes and reveals personal computer information about many of the employees, including Andy's QuickTime video he shot with Darryl and a letter/email he sent to a local newspaper. The few employees who did not leak information to the press proceed to jeer at Andy for the rest of the day. However, Erin Hannon commends Andy's bravery, and he leaves smiling.

Michael gives a public apology to a news crew, after which Jo tells him to let her know if she can help with any of his problems. When Michael half-jokingly asks to bring Holly back to Scranton, Jo sincerely tells him she will look into it, leaving him at a loss for words.

== Production ==
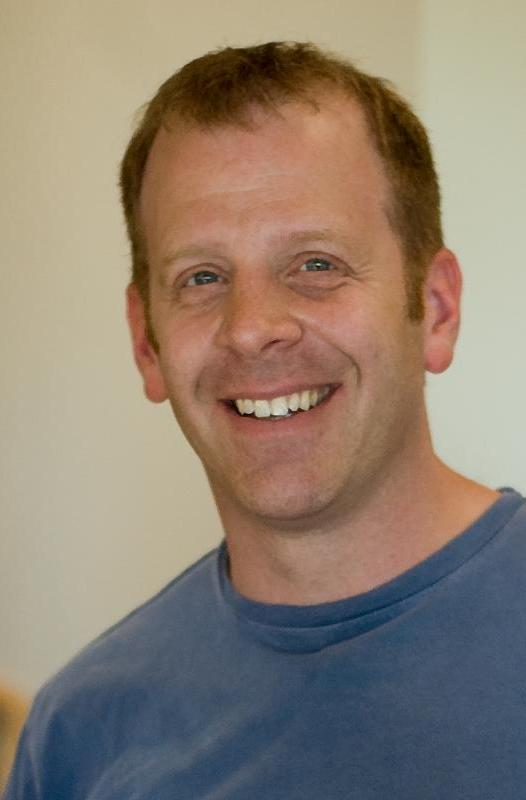
The Office actor, writer and producer Paul Lieberstein directed the episode.

"Whistleblower" was written by Warren Lieberstein and Halsted Sullivan and directed by Paul Lieberstein. It was Warren's and Halsted's second writing credit of the season after "Koi Pond" and Paul's fourth directing credit after "Money", "Two Weeks" and "Gossip". "Whistleblower" originally aired May 20, 2010 as the twenty-sixth episode and season finale of season 6. The episode guest stars Kathy Bates as Jo Bennet, Zach Woods as Gabe Lewis, and Andy Buckley as David Wallace. It is Andy Buckley's second guest appearance after getting fired from Dunder Mifflin since "Sabre". It was Kathy Bates' fourth appearance on the show, after first appearing in "Sabre". Zach Woods made his ninth appearance on the show.

== Cultural references ==
While talking with his real estate agent on his cellphone, Dwight states that the office park is 1725 Slough Avenue. "Slough" is a reference to the UK edition of The Office which is set in Slough, United Kingdom.

== Reception ==
In its original American broadcast, "Whistleblower" was viewed by an estimated 6.60 million viewers with a 3.4 rating/10% share in the 18–49 demographic coming second in its timeslot after the season finale of Grey's Anatomy, receiving the same rating as last week's episode, "The Chump" and dropping 3% from last years finale, "Company Picnic" according to Nielsen Media Research. The episode, "Whistleblower" ranked 13th in the weekly 18–49 demographic ratings and ranked becoming the highest rated show on NBC that week.

Cindy White of IGN gave the episode a 7.8 saying it was "Good" and "This was probably the weakest finale in the show's history, coming in just below "Hot Girl", which ended the first six-episode run by at least introducing a new potential love interest for Jim." Nathan Rabin of The A.V. Club gave this episode a B+, stating "tonight’s episode capped off a solid season on a promising note, tantalizing us with the prospect of Holly’s return." Joel Keller of AOL's TV Squad gave the episode a negative review for not having enough plot twists saying "'Whistleblower' was no 'Casino Night.' It wasn't even close. In fact, it sent the season out on a lame note, indicative of how up and down this season has been."

Darren Franich of Entertainment Weekly gave the episode a positive review and wrote "This was an interesting way for The Office to end its sixth, and least cohesive, season: an admission that not a whole lot happened, followed by a callback to a plotline from last season. Still, there was some real heft to this closing episode—enough to give me some hope. Will Leitch of New York said "The Office's season six was usually funny and always big-hearted, but there was never much at stake." James Poniewozik of Time criticized the show for the lack of stakes during the season, but stated "The season finale, 'Whistleblower', in some ways was characteristic of this season, in that some of its best moments came from characters at the periphery of the story. But it was also at best a sign of what this season could have been, and ended on at least a glimmer of hope for the next one."

TV Fanatic gave the episode a 3.5/5.0 saying "Instead, what shaped up like an seismic confrontation between Michael and Jo turned into a heart-to-heart of sorts. Enjoyable in its own right, yes. Epic finale material? Eh." M. Giant of Television Without Pity gave the episode a B+. Rick Porter of Zap2it said "While the entire conversation between Michael and Jo on her private jet was wonderful, a lot of the investigation into the leak of Sabre's printer problems was not."
