= Murder (The Office) =

- The Office episode
- Episode no.: Season 6 Episode 10
- Directed by: Greg Daniels
- Written by: Daniel Chun
- Cinematography by: Matt Sohn
- Editing by: David Rogers
- Production code: 6010
- Original air date: November 12, 2009
- Running time: 22 minutes

Guest appearance
- Andy Buckley as David Wallace (voice)

Episode chronology
← Previous "Double Date"	Next → "Shareholder Meeting"
- The Office (American season 6)

"Murder" is the tenth episode of the sixth season of the American comedy series The Office and the show's 110th episode overall. It was written by Daniel Chun and directed by Greg Daniels. It originally aired on NBC on November 12, 2009. The episode guest stars Andy Buckley as David Wallace, although he only appears via the phone.

The series—presented as if it were a real documentary—depicts the everyday lives of office employees in the Scranton, Pennsylvania, branch of the fictional Dunder Mifflin Paper Company. In the episode, rumors spread that Dunder Mifflin is in serious financial trouble, so Michael Scott (Steve Carell) tries to distract the office by having everyone play a murder mystery game called Belles, Bourbon, and Bullets. Meanwhile, Andy Bernard (Ed Helms) uses the game as a way to ask out Erin (Ellie Kemper), but fears he may have asked out Erin's character, instead of Erin herself.

"Murder" was the first entry in the series written by Chun. The episode also was the inception of two major story arcs, the first being the season-long arc of Dunder Mifflin going out of business and its purchase by the printer company Sabre in the episode of the same name, and the second being the budding romance between Andy and Erin. The episode scored a 4.2/10 rating share in the 18- to 49-year-old demographic, and was watched by 8.046 million viewers. The episode received largely positive reviews from critics, with many highlighting its purposeful ridiculousness.

== Plot ==
The members of the office learn that Dunder Mifflin is in financial trouble. In an attempt to get the worried staff under control, Michael Scott and Jim Halpert call a meeting to provide optimistic viewpoints. On an impulse, Michael pulls out a murder mystery party game called Belles, Bourbon, and Bullets and forces the rest of the staff to play along. It is set in Savannah, Georgia, and everyone has to adopt a Southern accent. Thanks to Pam Halpert, Andy Bernard, and Phyllis Vance, the game becomes a hit, and everyone present starts to play along, except for Oscar Martinez, who tries to get updates on the situation from corporate, and Creed Bratton, who shows up late to work and flees after being told he is a suspect in a murder. Jim, however, believes that the entire exercise is pointless.

Andy decides he needs to make a move on Erin Hannon before the day is out, as he may otherwise never see her again due to the possible impending closure of Dunder Mifflin. While in character, he asks Erin out for a weekend date but becomes unsure if he really asked her out, or her murder mystery character, "Naughty Nelly." He is worried that Erin only agreed because Naughty Nelly is a promiscuous character.

Oscar returns and informs everyone that accounting has been notified to stop payments to vendors. This brings the staff out of the game and back to the reality of losing their jobs. Michael tries to win them back but accidentally skips to the game's conclusion, revealing that Phyllis's character was the murderer. Everyone else goes back to work even more stressed out. Michael refuses to give up and continues playing the game with Dwight Schrute. Andy and Erin meet at the receptionist desk, where Erin asks him about their upcoming date. Andy tries to sound out whether the date is real or fictional by suggesting that they go to Savannah for their date. Erin remarks that Savannah is a long distance away, but does so in character; confused by this, Andy slips up and indicates that the "date" was just part of the game. Erin says she was also just playing but appears humiliated as she walks away and later reveals to the camera crew that she thought the date was real.

Michael tries to introduce another murder and other twists to the story to pull his staff back into the party. This infuriates Jim to his breaking point, and they hold a private talk in Michael's office. Michael snaps at Jim and points out that he is doing this to keep the office calm. CFO David Wallace finally returns the phone calls to Jim and reveals that, while nothing has been officially decided yet, Dunder Mifflin is expected to be insolvent by year-end. Jim hides the news from the staff and nudges them back into the party, realizing that Michael was doing this to help his co-workers cope. Michael, Dwight, Andy, and Pam get into a fake Mexican standoff lasting until 6:00 at night. Jim pulls Pam out so they can go home, and the others pretend to shoot each other to death.

== Production ==
The episode was written by Daniel Chun, and was his first script for the series. The episode also was the inception of two major story arcs, the first being the season-long arc of Dunder Mifflin going out of business and its purchase by the printer company Sabre in the episode of the same name, and the second being the budding romance between Andy and Erin. According to series creator and episode director Greg Daniels, the episode explores the idea that Michael is positively motivated due to his subconscious; although his antics seem nonsensical to many members of the office, in the end, his idea to take his coworkers' minds off of the fiscal trouble proves to be the best choice. This was first explored in the third season episode "Grief Counseling". Chun later explained in a Q&A with The Office fansite OfficeTally that "the episode was partly about Jim realizing that sometimes Michael isn't crazy, he's crazy like a fox" in that sometimes his underlying motives are clever.

Most of the names were based on "Southern puns", and it took Chun a while to think of all the names. All of the props, cards, and box were designed by the series' prop department. The producers tried to market the game as a real product, although that never came to fruition. Chun crafted the cold open after being inspired by the second season episode "The Fight" because he wanted to see more "Karate Dwight". In the original version of the open, the script featured Dwight and Michael kicking each other in the groin. Jennifer Celotta, however, suggested that Dwight fight himself. The episode guest-stars Andy Buckley, who plays David Wallace. Buckley appears only via the telephone, and recorded his lines in the annex of the set, to give the illusion that he was calling from a long ways away.

"Murder" was directed by Daniels. He particularly enjoyed directing both the cold open, as well as the closing tag, likening both to "an action film". In regards to the latter, he referred to it as a sequence that director Quentin Tarantino would have thought up, and noted the importance of having the camera appear in the middle of the Mexican standoff to reveal Fischer. Wilson, Helms, and Carell enjoyed filming the scene, and were particularly exuberant when it came time to fake-kill each other. Several of the scenes, such as when Andy first asks Erin on a date, had to be re-shot so that the cameras were in more discreet places. Daniels later referred to these shots as "spy shots". Initially, after Michael announces that "there has been a murder", the show was supposed to have cut to a commercial break. However, the producers realized that this was too misleading, as it would have implied that a real homicide had taken place. Gene Stupnitsky came up with the line "Catch you on the flippety-flip" for Michael, and the writing staff had been trying to get it into an episode for years.

The Season Six DVD contains a number of deleted scenes from this episode. Notable cut scenes include Michael berating Erin and then telling her not to cry or laugh, Michael making an anachronistic reference to slavery during the game (which Pam reminds him is set during the 1950s), and Andy averting the incestuous implications of asking Erin out (since their characters are siblings) by concocting a story that his character was adopted.

== Cultural references ==
Wallace alerts the office that the company's troubles have been published in the Wall Street Journal, but Michael and Erin mistake this to mean the "feelings journal". Michael listens to "Lullaby" by Shawn Mullins to soothe himself; Chun explained that the reason the song was chosen was because "Michael would probably have loved top 40 pop from the 90s. And I figured the song would have to be devoid of subtext. That's why 'Lullaby' felt like a fit." When Jim lowers the volume on Michael's computer, the tell-tale "click" of a Mac computer comes out of the speakers. Daniels and Chun note that this was intentional, and they wanted that specific sound, even though Windows computers do not make that sound. Pam's southern accent is compared to the fictional character Forrest Gump. After Andy successfully does a Savannah accent, Kevin asks him to do "the Swedish Chef". Andy, not understanding the reference asks "what province" he is from, to which Kevin replies that "he lives on Sesame Street, dumbass." Angela blames her character's dabbling with the dark arts—she portrays a witch doctor in the game—with being exposed to the Harry Potter series.

== Reception ==
"Murder" first aired on NBC on November 12, 2009. In its original American broadcast, the episode was viewed by an estimated 8.046 million viewers and received a 4.2 rating/10 percent share in the 18–49 demographic. This means that it was seen by 4.2 percent of all 18- to 49-year-olds, and 10 percent of all 18- to 49-year-olds watching television at the time of the broadcast. This marked a slight increase in the ratings from the previous episode, "Double Date".

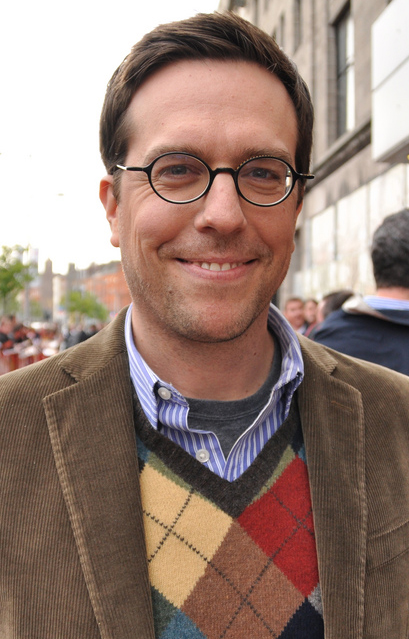
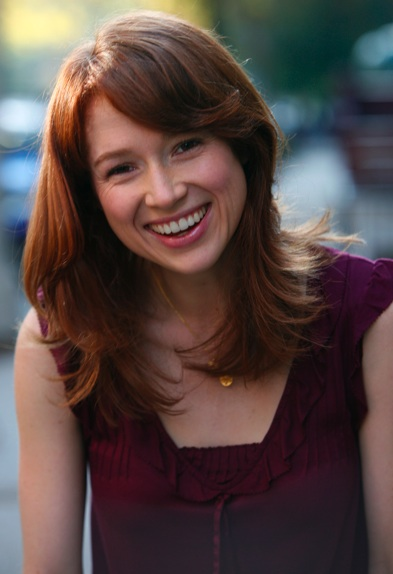
The subplot involving Ed Helms (left) and Ellie Kemper (right) was enjoyed by critics.

"Murder" received generally positive reviews, with many complimenting that the show dabbled in a ridiculous situation with over-the-top characters while, in the end, still having a point. Dan Phillips of IGN said that the episode was a "major step up" from the "disappointing" last two episodes, "Koi Pond" and "Double Date". Phillips stated that the episode "struck a nice balance between unbound silliness and grounded drama, even if the silliness dominated at times." Phillips praised the way that, when Michael stood up to Jim and argued that the office members needed the game to remain sane, "the character I love had returned after playing the part of moronic jerk for too much of this season." Ultimately, he gave the episode an 8.8 out of 10 score, denoting a "great" episode.

Nathan Rabin of The A.V. Club awarded the episode an "A−" and praised the way it both managed to touch upon Dunder Mifflin's serious economic trouble, as well as allowed the actors and actresses—and Steve Carell in particular—to use "ridiculous accent[s]" and "crazy character[s]". He also enjoyed the way that Andy and Erin's subplot was developed, writing that "Andy becomes a deeper, more lovable character with each passing episode" and that "Erin has quickly become an appealing, engaging character." He concluded that the episode was enjoyable because it "was silliness with a purpose".

Alan Sepinwall praised Krasinski's acting, saying that he got the chance to "nail a great dramatic moment". He also felt that Dunder Mifflin's crisis was an interesting development for the show, and put a new spin on the recurring theme of fiscal issues. Finally, he praised the Andy and Erin romancing, saying that it "allows the writers to push a similar scenario [that had been used with Pam and Jim] in a more overtly comic direction, while still getting some pathos out of it." Gage Henry of Paste felt that the entry was a "great way to dust off last week’s" episode. He was pleased that it show-cased Michael as the "all-knowing father figure whose mysterious ways pan out in the end."
