= The Office (American TV series) season 6 =

The Office
- Season 6
- DVD cover
- Showrunners: Paul Lieberstein; Jennifer Celotta
- Starring: Steve Carell; Rainn Wilson; John Krasinski; Jenna Fischer; B. J. Novak; Ed Helms; Leslie David Baker; Brian Baumgartner; Creed Bratton; Kate Flannery; Mindy Kaling; Ellie Kemper; Angela Kinsey; Paul Lieberstein; Oscar Nunez; Craig Robinson; Phyllis Smith
- No. of episodes: 26

Release
- Original network: NBC
- Original release: September 17, 2009 – May 20, 2010

Season chronology
- ← Previous; Season 5 Next → Season 7

The sixth season of the American television comedy The Office premiered in the United States on NBC on September 17, 2009, and concluded on May 20, 2010. The season consisted of 22 half-hour episodes, and 2 hour-long episodes to comprise the 26 total episodes of material created. The Office is an American adaptation of the British TV series, and is presented in a mockumentary format, portraying the daily lives of office employees in the Scranton, Pennsylvania branch of the fictitious Dunder Mifflin Paper Company. The season stars Steve Carell, Rainn Wilson, John Krasinski, Jenna Fischer, B. J. Novak, and Ed Helms, with supporting performances from Leslie David Baker, Brian Baumgartner, Creed Bratton, Kate Flannery, Mindy Kaling, Ellie Kemper, Angela Kinsey, Paul Lieberstein, Oscar Nunez, Craig Robinson, and Phyllis Smith.

The season has been cited by several critics as weaker than earlier seasons, despite still receiving generally favorable reviews. The season ranked fifty-second in the season ratings with an average of 7.80 million viewers per episode, marking a steep drop in the ratings from the previous season which had an average of nine million viewers.

The sixth season of The Office aired on Thursdays at 9:00 p.m. (Eastern) in the United States. The season was released on DVD and Blu-ray by Universal Studios Home Entertainment in a four-disc box set in the Region 1 area on September 7, 2010. The DVD set contains all 26 episodes, as well as commentaries from creators, writers, actors, and directors on some of the episodes. It also contains deleted scenes from all of the episodes, as well as bloopers.

== Production ==
The sixth season of the show was produced by Reveille Productions and Deedle-Dee Productions, both in association with Universal Media Studios. The show is based upon the British series created by Ricky Gervais and Stephen Merchant, both of whom are executive producers on both the US and UK versions. The Office is produced by Greg Daniels, who is also an executive producer. Daniels would have a limited role in this season, only co-writing an episode and directing another, as he was busy writing his new show, Parks and Recreation which he co-created with Office writer/producer Michael Schur, who left the writing staff of The Office after season four to focus on the new show. Returning writers from the previous season include Mindy Kaling, B. J. Novak, Paul Lieberstein, Lee Eisenberg, Gene Stupnitsky, Brent Forrester, Justin Spitzer, Jennifer Celotta, Aaron Shure, Charlie Grandy, Warren Lieberstein, and Halsted Sullivan. New writers in the sixth season include Daniel Chun, Jason Kessler (who served as script coordinator) and Jonathan Hughes (who previously wrote several of the Office webisodes). Lieberstein served as executive producer and showrunner. Kaling, Novak, Eisenberg, Stupnitsky and Shure were co-executive producers; Celotta and Forrester were consulting producers; Chun was a supervising producer; and Spitzer, Grandy, Warren Lieberstein and Halsted Sullivan were producers.

This season featured 26 episodes directed by 20 directors. Paul Lieberstein, Randall Einhorn and Seth Gordon each directed several episodes during the season. Writers Jennifer Celotta, Lee Eisenberg and Brent Forrester each directed episodes. Cast members B. J. Novak, John Krasinski, Steve Carell, Mindy Kaling and Rainn Wilson all directed episodes as well.

== Season overview ==
Notable plots that affect the sixth season and beyond include:

- Jim Halpert's promotion to co-manager alongside Michael Scott and his subsequent return to sales.
- Dwight Schrute's anger and jealousy that he was passed over for the co-manager job and his subsequent attempts to sabotage Jim.
- Jim's wedding to Pam Beesly.
- Michael engaging in a romantic relationship with Pam's mother Helene, much to Pam's horror.
- Dunder Mifflin navigating through the economic crisis.
- Dunder Mifflin getting bought out by Florida-based printer company Sabre and the arrival of Sabre representatives Jo Bennett and Gabe Lewis.
- Warehouse foreman Darryl Philbin earning a promotion to the upstairs office.
- Andy Bernard's attempts to court Erin Hannon.
- Jim and Pam welcoming their first child, Cecelia "Cece" Halpert.
- Dwight Schrute and Angela Martin contractually agreeing to have a baby together.

== Cast ==
Many characters portrayed by The Office cast are based on the British version of the show. While these characters normally have the same attitude and perceptions as their British counterparts, the roles have been redesigned to better fit the American show. The show is known for its generally large cast size, with many of its actors and actresses known particularly for their improvisational work.

=== Main ===
- Steve Carell as Michael Scott, regional manager of the Dunder Mifflin Scranton Branch. Loosely based on David Brent, Gervais' character in the British version, Scott is a dim-witted and lonely man, who attempts to win friends as the office comedian, usually making himself look bad in the process.
- Rainn Wilson as Dwight Schrute, who, based upon Gareth Keenan, is the office's top-performing sales representative.
- John Krasinski as Jim Halpert, a sales representative who is co-manager for part of this season, and is based on Tim Canterbury.
- Jenna Fischer as Pam Beesly/Halpert, who is based on Dawn Tinsley, the office's former receptionist who is now part of the sales team. She is shy, but in many cases a cohort with Jim Halpert, whom she marries and has a baby with.
- B. J. Novak as Ryan Howard, who had previously left Dunder Mifflin to travel to Thailand, only to be subsequently re-hired in the fifth season "Michael Scott Paper Company" story arc. After making enemies with the recently promoted Jim, Ryan is subsequently moved to a closet office.
- Ed Helms as Andy Bernard, who had appeared regularly since the opening of the third season, is added to the starring cast from the episode "Sabre" onwards.

=== Starring ===
- Leslie David Baker as Stanley Hudson, a grumpy salesman.
- Brian Baumgartner as Kevin Malone, a dim-witted accountant, who is based on Keith Bishop.
- Creed Bratton as Creed Bratton, the office's strange quality assurance officer.
- Kate Flannery as Meredith Palmer, the promiscuous supplier relations representative.
- Mindy Kaling as Kelly Kapoor, the pop-culture obsessed customer service representative.
- Ellie Kemper as Erin Hannon, the receptionist and new love interest of Andy.
- Angela Kinsey as Angela Martin, a judgemental accountant.
- Paul Lieberstein as Toby Flenderson, the sad-eyed human resources representative.
- Oscar Nunez as Oscar Martinez, an intelligent accountant, who is also gay.
- Craig Robinson as Darryl Philbin, the warehouse manager.
- Phyllis Smith as Phyllis Vance, a motherly saleswoman.

=== Special guest star ===
- Kathy Bates as Jo Bennet, the CEO of Sabre Industries.

=== Recurring ===
- Andy Buckley as David Wallace, Dunder Mifflin's CFO.
- Linda Purl as Helene Beesly, Pam's mother, who previously appeared in the season two episode "Sexual Harassment", although the role was recast with Purl, who first appeared in "Niagara", and made two more appearances.
- Bobby Ray Shafer as Bob Vance, Phyllis’ husband, who runs Vance Refrigeration.
- Kelen Coleman as Isabel Poreba, Pam's friend who becomes interested in Dwight.
- Sam Daly as Matt, a warehouse worker that Oscar has a crush on.
- Zach Woods as Gabe Lewis, the director of Sabre sales.
- Nelson Franklin as Nick, the IT guy.
- Amy Pietz as Donna, who is cheating on her husband with Michael.
- Hugh Dane as Hank Tate, the building's security guard.

=== Notable guests ===
- Max Carver as Eric, an intern.
- Anna Camp as Penny Beesly, Pam's sister.
- Rick Overton as William Beesly, Pam's father.
- David Costabile as Eric Ward, an investment banker.
- David Koechner as Todd Packer, a rude and offensive traveling salesman, and Michael's best friend.
- Christian Slater as himself, hosting a Sabre welcoming video.

== Reception ==
The sixth-season premiere "Gossip" received a 4.0 share in the Nielsen ratings among viewers aged 18 to 49, meaning that 4.0% of viewers aged 18 to 49 watched the episode. The episode was seen by 8.21 million viewers. The show ranked 17th in the seasonal 18–49 demographic ratings with an average of a 4.0 rating in the demographic. The viewership was an 18 percent drop compared to the fifth-season premiere, "Weight Loss". The season finale, "Whistleblower" was viewed by 6.60 million viewers with a 3.4 rating/10% share in the 18–49, marking a 3% drop from the fifth-season finale, "Company Picnic." The season also ranked 52nd in the seasonal total viewership with an average of 7.80 million viewers.

=== Critical reception ===
The sixth season received generally favorable reviews, with an overall score of 78/100 on Metacritic. However, some critics identified a decline in quality compared to previous seasons. The season mainly faced criticism for a lack of stakes for the characters. Some critics have also criticized the conclusion to the Jim and Pam romance while others were critical of the lack of growth for Michael. Cindy White of IGN gave the season a 7.5 saying it was "Good" and "We did get some funny moments and some good episodes in Season 6, but as a whole it just doesn't compare to the strength of seasons past." She also went on to criticize the storylines including Jim's stint as co-manager. Will Leitch of New York said "The Office's season six was usually funny and always big-hearted, but there was never much at stake". Entertainment Weekly writer Darren Franich called the season the "least cohesive" season of the series.

=== Honors ===
The show received numerous nominations. The show was nominated for Favorite TV Comedy at the 36th People's Choice Awards, but lost to The Big Bang Theory. The show was nominated for Screen Actors Guild Award for Outstanding Performance by an Ensemble in a Comedy Series for the fourth time at the 16th Screen Actors Guild Awards, but lost to Glee. It was also nominated for two awards at Writers Guild of America Awards 2009 for Comedy Series and Episodic Comedy for the episode "Gossip" written by Paul Lieberstein. This season received four Emmy nominations at the 62nd Primetime Emmy Awards—Outstanding Comedy Series, Outstanding Lead Actor in a Comedy Series (Steve Carell), Outstanding Writing for a Comedy Series (Greg Daniels and Mindy Kaling for "Niagara") and Outstanding Sound Mixing for a Comedy or Drama Series (Half-Hour) and Animation.

== Episodes ==
In the following table, "U.S. viewers (million)" refers to the number of Americans who viewed the episode on the night of broadcast. Episodes are listed by the order in which they aired, and may not necessarily correspond to their production codes.

No. overall	No. in season	Title	Directed by	Written by	Original release date	Prod. code	U.S. viewers (millions)
101	1	"Gossip"	Paul Lieberstein	Paul Lieberstein	September 17, 2009	6001	8.21
As the summer interns prepare to depart, the office gossips about them and Michael feels left out. Michael discovers that Stanley is having an affair, and tells everyone. When Michael realizes the damage he's caused, he fabricates numerous other rumors to discredit himself, including that Andy is gay (confusing Andy) and that Pam is pregnant (unbeknownst to him that she is actually pregnant). As Michael tries to clear the air, Jim and Pam admit their rumor is true in an attempt to save Stanley from embarrassment. Michael accidentally confirms the suspicions of Stanley’s wife Terry about his affair, which gets Stanley extremely angry.
102	2	"The Meeting"	Randall Einhorn	Aaron Shure	September 24, 2009	6002	7.46
Jim submits a plan for promotions for himself and Michael to David which Michael manages to bungle as he thinks that Jim is trying to steal his position. Dwight and Toby investigate Darryl's worker's comp claim. Pam struggles to gather responses for her wedding. Ultimately, Jim and Michael are made co-manager to Dwight's horror.
103	3	"The Promotion"	Jennifer Celotta	Jennifer Celotta	October 1, 2009	6003	7.41
Jim and Michael's management styles clash, especially after David's budget will only allow a small or no raise this year. Chaos in the office relating to this ends up bringing them together. Dwight fails in his attempt to raise allies against Jim. Pam feels awkward asking for cash instead of wedding gifts.
104	4	"Niagara"^{‡}	Paul Feig	Greg Daniels & Mindy Kaling	October 8, 2009	6004	9.42
105	5	"Niagara"^{‡}	Paul Feig	Greg Daniels & Mindy Kaling	October 8, 2009	6005	9.42
The Office travels to Niagara Falls to celebrate Jim and Pam's wedding. Michael gives the whole office Friday and Monday to attend the wedding in Niagara. Jim accidentally reveals Pam’s pregnancy during his speech, getting Pam's meemaw upset. Michael worsens the situation by trying to give a speech at the rehearsal dinner. Michael and Dwight try to hook up with guests at the wedding. Dwight succeeds with Pam's bridesmaid Isabel, but Michael, who failed to reserve a room, ends up sleeping next to an ice machine. Andy injures his scrotum while dancing the night before the wedding. The night before the wedding proves to be a surprise for Pam. Jim and Pam delay the wedding when they sneak off to marry on the Maid of the Mist, allowing them to calm their nerves and enjoy their wedding. Michael spends the evening after the wedding with Pam's mother, Helene.
106	6	"Mafia"	David Rogers	Brent Forrester	October 15, 2009	6006	8.03
Michael meets with an insurance salesman and is convinced by Dwight and Andy that he is part of the Mafia. The staff constantly call Jim and Pam on their honeymoon, until finally Kevin accidentally cancels Jim's credit card while using Jim’s office as a farting room. Dwight, Michael and Andy set up a lunch meeting with the insurance salesman.
107	7	"The Lover"	Lee Eisenberg	Lee Eisenberg & Gene Stupnitsky	October 22, 2009	6007	8.73
Jim and Pam return from their honeymoon and are shocked when Michael reveals he is dating Helene, Pam's mother. Pam is incensed and openly berates Michael. Dwight attempts to bug Jim's office in his plan to sabotage Jim.
108	8	"Koi Pond"	Reggie Hudlin	Warren Lieberstein & Halsted Sullivan	October 29, 2009	6009	8.21
While on the way to a business meeting, Michael falls into a koi pond. The staff tease him so he holds an anti-bullying seminar. Pam and Andy go cold-calling to stir up some new business; they reluctantly use clients' mistaking them as a couple to their advantage.
109	9	"Double Date"	Seth Gordon	Charlie Grandy	November 5, 2009	6008	8.09
Jim and Pam reluctantly lunch with Michael and Helene for her birthday. However, when Michael learns Helene's age, he dumps her, infuriating Pam even more. She slaps Michael in the parking lot after work. Dwight tries to curry favors from everyone in the office to help him overthrow Jim.
110	10	"Murder"	Greg Daniels	Daniel Chun	November 12, 2009	6010	8.05
The Dunder Mifflin staff are troubled by renewed rumors of insolvency. Michael forces the office into a day of diversions, primarily playing a murder mystery role-playing game. Andy awkwardly attempts to court Erin.
111	11	"Shareholder Meeting"	Charles McDougall	Justin Spitzer	November 19, 2009	6011	7.39
Michael is excited when he's invited by David Wallace to attend the Dunder Mifflin shareholder meeting in New York; he is dismayed by the hostile crowd and causes the board of directors even more trouble. Jim finds he is being undermined by Ryan who refuses to do work, so Jim decides to make an example of him in front of the staff. As Michael, Dwight and Oscar leave New York in a hired limousine, a news ticker shows a steep drop in Dunder Mifflin's stock price.
112	12	"Scott's Tots"	B. J. Novak	Gene Stupnitsky & Lee Eisenberg	December 3, 2009	6013	8.05
Michael must renege on a promise he made to a group of kids ten years ago to pay for their college tuition. However, in spite of his mean treatment, Erin proves a source of support. Meanwhile, Jim falls victim to one of Dwight's schemes to get him fired: creation of an employee of the month program. Although the staff and David are angered when Dwight rigs the winners to be Jim and Pam, Jim survives. Ryan joins forces with Dwight to bring down Jim.
113	13	"Secret Santa"	Randall Einhorn	Mindy Kaling	December 10, 2009	6014	8.51
Michael is outraged when Jim allows Phyllis to be Santa at the office Christmas party, and retaliates by dressing first as Santa, then Jesus. David reveals to Michael that there is a buyer for Dunder Mifflin. He will most likely be fired; the Scranton staff will stay on, much to their relief. Meanwhile, Oscar has a crush on Matt, the new gay warehouse worker, and Andy and Erin continue to flirt, which starts out badly when Andy gives her "the Twelve Days of Christmas" and the birds from the first few attack her, but picks back up with the twelve drummers drumming.
114	14	"The Banker"	Jeffrey Blitz	Jason Kessler	January 21, 2010	6012	7.28
When an investment banker comes to Scranton in order to sign off on the branch before the sale of Dunder Mifflin. Michael, Dwight, Andy and Pam pull out all the stops in hopes of impressing him with their high profile contacts. Toby reminisces about all the great times they have had in the office.
115	15	"Sabre"	John Krasinski	Jennifer Celotta	February 4, 2010	6015	7.37
Michael has difficulties accepting the new policies of Sabre and its CEO Jo Bennett (Kathy Bates). Michael goes to David Wallace for advice, but he finds David in a sad unemployed depression. Jim and Pam go for an interview for a local daycare center. Both Erin and Andy wait for the other to make the next move.
116	16	"The Manager and the Salesman"	Marc Webb	Mindy Kaling	February 11, 2010	6016	7.44
The office is eager to welcome Sabre CEO Jo Bennett to Scranton, and are dazzled by her Southern ways. When Jo finds out there are two branch managers, she says either Michael or Jim must go back to being a salesman. Jim surrenders his role as manager when he learns about the no-cap commission policy, making Michael happy, but then Michael learns about it too, making things difficult. Meanwhile, Andy's Valentine's Day plan for Erin backfires when he accidentally gives the card he meant for her to Kelly.
117	17	"The Delivery"^{‡}	Seth Gordon	Daniel Chun	March 4, 2010	6018	9.02
118	18	"The Delivery"^{‡}	Harold Ramis	Charlie Grandy	March 4, 2010	6019	9.02
Pam's contractions begin but she is determined to wait it out as long as possible so they can have more time at the hospital, unnerving Jim. Meanwhile, the rest of the office tries to distract Pam from the pain with food and entertainment. Michael anxiously waits for Pam and Jim's baby, Cecilia, to be born. Back at the office, Erin makes Andy jealous when she has lunch with Kevin causing Andy to finally ask Erin out. Dwight and Angela draft a contract to have a baby together, but Dwight has mixed feelings after seeing Isabel at Jim and Pam's house when he renovates the couple's kitchen.
119	19	"St. Patrick's Day"	Randall Einhorn	Jonathan Hughes	March 11, 2010	6017	7.43
Michael thinks he has impressed Jo, only to discover that someone else in the office has caught her eye. Dwight makes trouble for Jim on his first day back from paternity leave. Andy and Erin go on their first date, with interesting results.
120	20	"New Leads"	Brent Forrester	Brent Forrester	March 18, 2010	6020	7.67
Sabre's policy of "sales is king" goes to the sales staff's heads, making the rest of the office resent their bad attitude. In order to regain control, Michael hides their expensive new leads, which leads Jim on a "treasure hunt" all through the business park. Michael's plan backfires when Kevin accidentally throws some of the leads in the trash and Michael and Dwight must go to the Scranton dump to retrieve them. Andy and Erin kiss for the first time at the Scranton dump while searching for the leads together.
121	21	"Happy Hour"	Matt Sohn	B. J. Novak	March 25, 2010	6021	7.28
Oscar arranges a happy hour with the warehouse staff so he can flirt with Matt. Pam is excited to see the staff and brings a date for Michael, but he ends up connecting with the bar manager, Donna (Amy Pietz), instead. Meanwhile, Andy and Erin announce their relationship. Dwight meets Isabel and drops Angela to hang out with Isabel, making Angela jealous. When Dwight tells Angela to forget about the pre-natal contract, she confronts him in front of Isabel.
122	22	"Secretary's Day"	Steve Carell	Mindy Kaling	April 22, 2010	6022	6.30
Andy tries to make Erin's Secretary's Day a memorable one. While having lunch with Erin, Michael informs her of Andy and Angela's past engagement, which Andy had been hiding from Erin. Oscar circulates a video he made which compares Kevin's voice to Cookie Monster's and Kevin turns to Gabe for help when the entire office gets in on the joke.
123	23	"Body Language"	Mindy Kaling	Justin Spitzer	April 29, 2010	6023	7.01
Pam and Jim work on their first sales pitch together to Donna, the manager of a local restaurant, but Michael keeps misreading the signals she's putting out. Dwight encourages Kelly to try out for the minority training program.
124	24	"The Cover-Up"	Rainn Wilson	Gene Stupnitsky & Lee Eisenberg	May 6, 2010	6024	6.84
Michael suspects Donna is cheating on him and puts PI Dwight Schrute on the case. Meanwhile, Andy is frustrated when no one takes his customer's complaint seriously.
125	25	"The Chump"	Randall Einhorn	Aaron Shure	May 13, 2010	6025	6.60
Michael is surprisingly cheerful after learning some bad news about Donna. The new parents, Pam and Jim, have trouble staying awake in the office. Meanwhile, Angela takes matters into her own hands when Dwight refuses to honor their pre-natal contract.
126	26	"Whistleblower"	Paul Lieberstein	Warren Lieberstein & Halsted Sullivan	May 20, 2010	6026	6.64
The press learns that Sabre printers catch on fire and Jo, suspecting that someone within the company leaked the information, sets out to discover who the whistle-blower is.

^‡ denotes an hour-long episode (with advertisements; actual runtime around 42 minutes).
