= Shareholder Meeting =

- The Office episode
- Episode no.: Season 6 Episode 11
- Directed by: Charles McDougall
- Written by: Justin Spitzer
- Cinematography by: Matt Sohn
- Editing by: Claire Scanlon
- Production code: 611
- Original air date: November 19, 2009

Guest appearances
- Andy Buckley as David Wallace; Chris Ellis as Chris O'Keefe; Ransford Doherty as a security guard; Alan Fudge as Alan Brand; Dale Raoul as Ronni; Gregory Schmauss as an angry shareholder

Episode chronology
← Previous "Murder"	Next → "Scott's Tots"
- The Office (American season 6)

"Shareholder Meeting" is the eleventh episode of the sixth season of the American comedy television series The Office and the show's 111th episode overall. Written by Justin Spitzer and directed by Charles McDougall, it originally aired on NBC on November 19, 2009.

The series, presented in a mockumentary style, depicts the everyday lives of office employees at the Scranton, Pennsylvania branch of the fictional Dunder Mufflin Paper Company. In this episode, Michael Scott (Steve Carell) is invited to attend a shareholder meeting in New York City, and is shocked to learn the shareholders are upset with the company's management. In Scranton, Jim Halpert (John Krasinski) struggles to keep order in Michael's absence, as his coworkers refuse to see him as their co-manager. The episode had 7.39 million viewers during its initial airing in the United States.

== Plot ==
Michael Scott is excited when he is invited by CEO Alan Brand to be honored on stage at the Dunder Mifflin shareholder meeting in New York City. He brings Andy Bernard, Dwight Schrute, and Oscar Martinez along for the ride in the limo that was sent. Oscar is outraged that the company spent money on a limo and booked a huge conference room for the meeting when they are about to go bankrupt. Andy suggests that Oscar bring up these grievances at the meeting, but Oscar refuses out of fear of losing his job. Dwight plans to ask Michael a softball question, but has to wait in a huge line for the microphone. When the meeting begins, the panel is met with jeers, which Michael did not expect. When the panel moves to take a break, the crowd's jeers increase as they protest that the panel has yet to offer any solutions to Dunder Mifflin's situation. Michael impulsively announces a 45-day plan to fix Dunder Mifflin, which is greeted with enthusiastic applause.

Back at the Scranton office, Jim Halpert assigns a simple task to Ryan Howard, who procrastinates as he sees no point since the company is on the verge of closing. Phyllis Vance takes a two-hour lunch date with her husband Bob. When Jim tries to reprimand her, she bluntly tells him that Michael always lets her take two-hour lunch breaks and that she does not have to listen to Jim. Jim learns that Ryan sent an email around the office regarding Jim's lack of authority over the office. Jim thinks that he needs to make an example of Ryan in front of everyone, but Pam Halpert does not think Jim is capable of doing so. Jim, after giving Ryan one last chance to do his work, gives him his own personal office space in the small closet in the kitchen, which lacks windows and possibly internet access so he will not bother anyone or become distracted. He presents this "honor" to Ryan in front of everyone, showing them he is able to assert his authority when needed. Ryan tries to apologize, but Jim puts him in the closet anyway.

In New York, a frustrated David Wallace reveals to Michael that Dunder Mifflin's corporate leaders have no plan to get the company back on track. Michael is astounded by this but remains positive and calls Oscar into the hotel room for some suggestions. However, Oscar is embarrassed and unwilling to criticize the management to their faces. Oscar instead compliments them, not repeating any of his earlier suggestions, and leaves. Michael follows and rebukes Oscar for backing down, but Oscar still refuses to help him. When Michael returns, he is further lambasted by the CEO and former U.S. Congressman Chris O'Keefe, who openly insults Michael. In his defense, Michael points out that he is the only person who seems to be making money for Dunder Mifflin and the only one offering any positive suggestions, going so far as to return the former Congressman's insult. Enraged, O'Keefe, who is presiding over the meeting, takes away Michael's limo privileges. Michael sneaks away into their limo with Dwight, Andy, and Oscar and drives out of the city. As they leave, Michael justifies his actions by saying that of everyone there, he and his team are the only ones who deserve to celebrate with limo rides. The stock market ticker shows the Dunder Mifflin (DMI) stock price, currently at $1.13, down 6 7/8, continue to drop dramatically.

== Production ==
New York outdoor scenes for the episode were filmed in California. Two taxi cabs along with Michael's limo, using New York plates, were shot in front of a California intersection with a Roman Revival style building in the background for a New York effect. The building has both a California state flag and US flag hanging over its entrance.

The cold opening for the episode deals with Dwight and his fictional Earth Day super hero "Recyclops". During Jim's narrative, he discusses the history of Recyclops, and a montage of Dwight harassing past receptionists was shown. The receptionists that Dwight harasses include: Pam, who is accompanied by Jim, circa 2006; Ryan; Ronni (Dale Raoul), who was introduced during the fifth season episode "Weight Loss"; and Erin. These clips were created to look as if they had been filmed in the past and were only then being used. This was not the only time this technique was used in the series. During the seventh season episode "Threat Level Midnight", there is a short sequence that was shot to look as if it had been filmed during the show's second season, although the scene itself was filmed in 2011. Furthermore, during the season nine episode "Customer Loyalty", the cold opening features a montage of Jim setting up a prank—which involves sending Dwight on a quest for the Holy Grail that heavily suggested that Jim set up the prank sometime during 2006, which would have taken place during the show's second season. Appropriately, the montage was filmed to look as if the documentarians were using archival footage of Jim; his hair matches the style that Jim had during the first few seasons of the show.

== Reception ==
This episode was watched by 7.39 million viewers, with a 3.7 rating and a 10 share in the 18–49 demographic.

"Shareholder Meeting" received positive reviews. Dan Phillips of IGN called the episode "funny from beginning to end", particularly praising the scenes between Michael and the board. Phillips also enjoyed the subplot between Jim and Ryan, stating that it "carried its fair share of comedic weight".

Michael's announcement that Dunder Mifflin would be going "carbon neutral" was a tie-in with NBC's "Green Week".
