= The Promotion (The Office) =

- The Office episode
- Episode no.: Season 6 Episode 3
- Directed by: Jennifer Celotta
- Written by: Jennifer Celotta
- Cinematography by: Randall Einhorn
- Editing by: David Rogers
- Production code: 603
- Original air date: October 1, 2009

Guest appearance
- Andy Buckley as David Wallace (voice)

Episode chronology
← Previous "The Meeting"	Next → "Niagara"
- The Office (American season 6)

"The Promotion" is the third episode of the sixth season of the American comedy series The Office and the show's 103rd episode overall. It was written and directed by Jennifer Celotta and originally aired in the United States on NBC on October 1, 2009.

In this episode, the office struggles to deal with having both Michael and Jim as managers, with Dwight trying to manipulate the office into thinking that Jim will be a horrible boss. Meanwhile, Pam tries to get people to give money as a wedding gift.

== Synopsis ==
The office is trying to adjust to having both Michael Scott and Jim Halpert as bosses, with Jim moving into a newly built personal office space in the main section. Michael and Jim constantly find themselves at odds with each other as Michael keeps having "conference room meetings" while Jim wants to keep productivity in the office place. They get a call from CFO David Wallace who tells them that not everyone in the branch will get their desired raise and that they will have to decide how to disperse it amongst the employees. Michael gets annoyed when Jim keeps making pros and cons lists for each idea. Jim decides to give the raises to the sales staff since they bring money to the company. Michael is against the idea, but invites Jim to announce it to the office.

Dwight Schrute, not wanting Jim as a boss, complains about the unfairness of Jim's decision despite being a salesman, as do all the non-sales people. Michael, who was scoffing at Jim, is then asked to give his idea, but he does not speak coherently about it, leading everyone to rail against him as much as Jim. Michael and Jim go back into the conference room to decide how to handle the raise issue. They ultimately decide that the raises should be performance-based, and decide to take turns placing beans on employee pictures, with each bean representing a small raise. When Michael and Jim leave the conference room, Dwight sneaks into the conference room and shows the employees their plan. Everyone gets upset at Michael and Jim for this, particularly Pam Beesly, whose picture did not have any beans, as Jim was trying to remain unbiased.

With the entire office now upset with both Michael and Jim, Dwight uses this opportunity to start an uprising against Jim personally. However, everyone in the office refuses to as they are more concerned about the raise issue. Michael then goes into Jim's office to check on him. Michael explains he felt terrible having to make those kinds of decisions on his own and he leaves to get Jim something. Jim comments that Michael is currently his only friend in the office at the moment, as everyone else, even probably Pam, is upset at him about the raise situation. Michael returns to give Jim his own new "World's Best Boss" mug and they share some gin together.

Pam is trying to discreetly ask everyone to give cash as wedding gifts instead of actual gifts. She first tries Phyllis Vance to no avail. She manages to get Kevin Malone to write her a $40 check, and starts to feel guilty about asking people for simple cash, but she gets ecstatic when she sees that the check is made out to "Mrs. Pam Halpert". When she then tries Ryan Howard, he cons her into giving him $50 as a supposed investment in betting on college basketball games.

== Reception ==
In its original American broadcast on October 1, 2009, "The Promotion" was seen by 7.28 million households, according to Nielsen ratings. It was a drop in viewership compared to the previous week's episode, "The Meeting". "The Promotion" received a 3.7 rating/10 share among viewers aged between 18 and 49. The episode received generally mixed reviews. Several commentators specifically praised the scene in which Meredith and Creed reveal they previously had sex.

""The Promotion" stands as a perfect marriage between a genuinely funny situation and a number of goofy asides and comedic gags, a formula which always makes for a great episode. Michael and Jim's dynamic grows a lot in this one episode."

— Dan Phillips, IGN

Nathan Rabin of The A.V. Club said the episode "represented both a return to The Office's roots and a bold look at what the future holds for the Dunder-Mifflin gang" due to the Michael and Jim co-manager arrangement. Rabin praised the episode's "sharp little character moments", like Oscar's deadpan speeches and Ryan's gambling schemes. IGN writer Dan Phillips said the episode further developed the relationship between Jim and Michael, and Phillips liked that they found common ground at the end. He also praised "laugh-out-loud gags", like the revelation about Creed and Meredith.

New York magazine writer Will Leitch said it was smart to make Jim a smug, flawed manager, and said "it was impossible not to love the quiet final scene with Michael and Jim bonding over the hatred their co-workers feel for them". Margaret Lyons of Entertainment Weekly said the episode felt like a "placeholder", although she said it improved upon a second viewing. Lyons said the episode had some good moments, "none of these moments seemed tied to the main plot" and was "basically just killing a week until The Big Wedding Episode OMG next Thursday". Alan Sepinwall of The Star-Ledger said "The Promotion" did not live up to a "promising new dynamic" between Michael and Jim set up in the previous episode, "The Meeting". However, Sepinwall said he liked the gifts subplot with Pam, and said Dwight's new role as "the office insurrectionist" has promise.
