= Scott's Tots =

- The Office episode
- Michael Scott poses behind several third graders that have been promised by him tuition money as part of the titular "Scott's Tots" program. The image appears in a newspaper seen in the episode.
- Episode no.: Season 6 Episode 12
- Directed by: B. J. Novak
- Written by: Gene Stupnitsky; Lee Eisenberg
- Cinematography by: Matt Sohn
- Editing by: David Rogers
- Production code: 6013
- Original air date: December 3, 2009
- Running time: 22 minutes

Guest appearances
- Andy Buckley as David Wallace (voice); Kwame Boateng as Derrick; Monnae Michael as a teacher

Episode chronology
← Previous "Shareholder Meeting"	Next → "Secret Santa"
- The Office (American season 6)

"Scott's Tots" is the twelfth episode of the sixth season of the American comedy television series The Office, and the show's 112th episode overall. The episode was directed by B. J. Novak, his directorial debut for the series, and written by Gene Stupnitsky and Lee Eisenberg. It first aired in the United States on NBC on December 3, 2009.

The series, presented in a mockumentary format, depicts the everyday lives of office employees at the Scranton, Pennsylvania branch of the fictitious Dunder Mifflin Paper Company. In the episode, it is revealed that ten years earlier, Michael (Steve Carell) recklessly promised to pay for the college tuition of an entire local third grade class if they could complete high school. Lacking the personal wealth necessary to fulfill his promise, he and Erin (Ellie Kemper) must go tell the students, who are now high school seniors, that they will not be receiving the money. Meanwhile, in Michael's absence, Dwight (Rainn Wilson) convinces Jim (John Krasinski) to start an employee-of-the-month program with the intention of getting Jim into trouble. The episode achieved a viewership of 8.05 million during its initial airing in the United States.

"Scott's Tots" was critically acclaimed upon its initial airing, with many calling it a classic Office episode. Gene Stupnitsky and Lee Eisenberg submitted this episode for the 2010 Emmys.

== Synopsis ==
A decade ago, Michael Scott launched a program named "Scott's Tots", promising a group of underprivileged 3rd graders that he would pay their full college tuition, provided they graduate from high school. He has failed to achieve his goal of being a millionaire, and is unable to fulfill the promise. He reluctantly visits their high school with Erin Hannon to break the bad news. Michael's promise encouraged the students to excel academically, and they greet Michael with standing applause. Michael admits his inability to pay for their college tuition, and attempts to make up for it by providing them laptop batteries. This fails to appease the angry students. Michael offers to a single student to at least pay for his books before he leaves. On the way back to the office, Erin informs a disconsolate Michael the students are on track for a higher-than-average graduation rate, and suggests "Scott's Tots" may be the cause. Michael compliments Erin's work ethic.

Meanwhile, on a suggestion from Andy Bernard, Jim Halpert starts an employee of the month program to increase office morale. Dwight Schrute planted the idea in Andy's head as part of a scheme to get Jim fired. He gives Jim a performance sheet to determine the employee of the month, with employees identified only by number, ostensibly to ensure a fair and unbiased assessment. Dwight, without Jim's authorization, also collects money from each of the employees for a cash prize. Dwight's sheet identifies Jim as the winner and his wife Pam as runner-up. Then, a cake is delivered to the office with Jim's face and the words "It Could Only Be You" on it. The other workers accuse Jim of extracting money from them.

Dwight initiates the second part of his plan by calling CFO David Wallace multiple times, each time pretending to be a different employee complaining about Jim's program. David calls Jim and chews him out for the mishap. Dwight listens in to the phone conversation from the pen recorder he left in Jim's office in the episode "The Lover". But instead of firing Jim, David apologizes to him for losing his temper, praises Jim, and confirms a dinner date with his wife, Jim, and Pam. Angry that his plan has not worked, Dwight creates an alliance with Ryan Howard to achieve his goal.

== Reception ==
"Scott's Tots" first aired on NBC on December 3, 2009. In its original American broadcast, the episode was viewed by an estimated 8.055 million viewers and received a 4.1 rating/11 percent share in the 18–49 demographic. This means that it was seen by 4.1 percent of all 18- to 49-year-olds, and 11 percent of all 18- to 49-year-olds watching television at the time of the broadcast. In addition, the episode ranked first in its half-hour timeslot and was the highest-rated NBC series of the night.

"The pay-off of this predicament plays with Michael's delusional tendencies brilliantly. As the students and teachers heap praise onto his shoulders, the kids even busting into a choreographed dance and rap number in his honor, you can sense Michael nearly convincing himself that he's really helping all these kids and that he deserves all the thanks. Steve Carell's facial expressions during this scene are absolutely priceless, and remind you what makes him one of the most gifted comedic actors around. Dread turns into amusement, which turns into pride, which finally turns back into dread when he realizes he's going to have to spill the beans."

— Dan Phillips, IGN

Dan Phillips of IGN gave the episode a 9.4 out of 10 rating, denoting an "amazing" episode. It was also the highest score given to any sixth-season episode by the site. Phillips called the episode "an instant classic and another phenomenal installment of this season, which hit some rough patches but seems to have recovered brilliantly", especially pointing out the scene between Michael and the irate students. Phillips felt that the main scene between Michael and the children was pivotal and that it "might just rank atop The Office's long list and rich history of uncomfortable yet hilarious moments".

Joel Keller of The Huffington Post wrote that "as the kids from that third-grade class praised Michael and told him how much his gift meant to them, all I could think of was, 'this is so wrong.' [...] The pain on Michael's face was palpable. I had the same expression." He, however, was more critical of the episode's subplot, noting that he was "getting tired of Dwight's diabolical plans". He felt that Jim should have caught onto Dwight's plan, rather than fall for it. Keller ultimately concluded that the episode was "a solid job this week. Not the best of the season, but not bad, either."

Nathan Rabin of The A.V. Club called the episode "kick-ass" and awarded it an "A−". Rabin commended the fact that Michael's bad-idea-for-the-right-reason made him likable. Furthermore, he noted that both Michael and the kids engaged in "mutually beneficial self-deception"; the former thought he could save those in need, and the latter had something to look forward to. Rabin also enjoyed the subplot involving Jim and Dwight, noting that it "afforded [actor Rainn Wilson] an opportunity to do surprisingly accurate, unconscionably mean impersonations of Stanley and Toby".

Several critics, on the other hand, felt that the main plot was too mean to be humorous. Gage Henry of Paste felt that the episode was weak because "one [of its storylines was] rather flimsy and the other ending up too atrocious to watch." He noted that the formula of "Jim tries to conduct one normal day at the office while Michael is out making an ass of himself somewhere" was "becoming bland". Ultimately, however, he could not decide if the episode "was commendably funny, or if it was as humorous as a child realizing that Santa Claus doesn’t exist." Henry graded the episode a 6 out of 10. Steve Marsi at TVFanatic did not enjoy it and was succinct in his review: "Last night's 'Scott's Tots' was not one of The Office's best. [...] it was actually a little depressing. Promising kids college tuition, then yanking it away?"

The episode has become notorious among fans of the show as one of its most awkward and uncomfortable episodes. Jenna Fischer and Angela Kinsey discussed the episode with B. J. Novak for their Office Ladies podcast on April 13, 2022.
