= Secret Santa (The Office) =

- The Office episode
- Phyllis Vance as Santa Claus.
- Episode no.: Season 6 Episode 13
- Directed by: Randall Einhorn
- Written by: Mindy Kaling
- Cinematography by: Matt Sohn
- Editing by: Claire Scanlon
- Production code: 614
- Original air date: December 10, 2009

Guest appearances
- Andy Buckley as David Wallace (voice); Sam Daly as Matt; Bobby Ray Shafer as Bob Vance

Episode chronology
← Previous "Scott's Tots"	Next → "The Banker"
- The Office (American season 6)

"Secret Santa" is the thirteenth episode of the sixth season of the American comedy series The Office and the show's 113th episode overall. It was written by Mindy Kaling and directed by Randall Einhorn. The episode aired on NBC on December 10, 2009. The night the episode premiered, it was immediately followed by an episode of 30 Rock with the same title.

In this episode, the office throws a Christmas party, and Michael is upset when Jim allows Phyllis to be Santa, since he has always been the one to dress up. Meanwhile, Oscar develops a crush on a new warehouse worker, and Andy's secret Santa gift to Erin – the 12 Days of Christmas, featuring live birds – does not go as well as planned.

== Synopsis ==
Michael Scott comes into the office as Santa and is outraged that Jim Halpert had already allowed Phyllis Vance to be Santa at the office Christmas party this year. Everyone enjoys having Phyllis as Santa, so Michael tries to gain attention, prompting Jim to tell him to cease and desist. Michael then rearranges his costume into a Jesus outfit and starts heckling the staff while Phyllis gives out the Secret Santa gifts. When Jim stops Michael again, Michael calls CFO David Wallace to complain. David asks not to be bothered as someone made an agreement to buy the company, which means that David will lose his job.

Michael calls a conference meeting to try to keep up everyone's spirits but reveals that the company is being sold. Jim notes that being sold could be different from going out of business, so Michael calls back David with everyone listening. David clarifies that only he, CEO Alan Brand, and a few other executives would lose their jobs, but the branches would remain because they are the only successful aspect of the company. The office cheers and goes back to the party. Everyone receives their Secret Santa gifts, and Michael apologizes to Phyllis for trying to overshadow her.

Oscar Martinez has a secret crush on Matt, one of the new warehouse workers. Pam Halpert plays matchmaker and introduces Matt to Oscar. After conversing a while, Matt leaves, and Oscar asks Pam to let him pursue Matt by himself.

Dwight Schrute's present has been delivered to him in pieces over several weeks. After assembling it, he believes it is a gun. However, after a hint from Michael, he rebuilds it and realizes it is, in fact, a nutcracker, which pleases him. Andy Bernard has asked to have Erin Hannon as his recipient for Secret Santa and gives her the Twelve Days of Christmas. However, the gifts — most of which are actual live birds — cause her physical harm, prompting her to publicly ask her Secret Santa to discontinue. Phyllis promises Andy not to reveal him as Erin's Secret Santa, but Michael outs him during his heckling. Erin becomes furious with Andy. As the office leaves for the night, they are greeted by twelve drummers in the parking lot. Andy joins them and wishes Erin a Merry Christmas, completing his Secret Santa gift to her. They start drumming and Erin is visibly pleased by the gesture.

== Reception ==
This episode was watched by 8.51 million viewers, with a 4.2 rating and an 11 share in the 18–49 demographic. IGN's Dan Phillips gave the episode an 8.7/10, saying that "The episode had a lot of great lines." He felt the disparate plot threads and jokes ultimately came together, especially praised the resolution of the Andy and Erin subplot, and concluded, "There have been better, funnier Christmas episodes in the past, but not by all that much."

== Producer's cut ==
Five days after the episode first aired on television, Hulu added the producer's cut of the episode to their website. This version includes 9 extra minutes, bringing the total length of the episode to 29:43.
