= The Meeting (The Office) =

- The Office episode
- Episode no.: Season 6 Episode 2
- Directed by: Randall Einhorn
- Written by: Aaron Shure
- Cinematography by: Matt Sohn
- Editing by: Claire Scanlon
- Production code: 602
- Original air date: September 24, 2009

Guest appearance
- Andy Buckley as David Wallace

Episode chronology
← Previous "Gossip"	Next → "The Promotion"
- The Office (American season 6)

"The Meeting" is the second episode of the sixth season of the American comedy television series The Office and the 102nd overall episode of the series. It originally aired on NBC in the United States and simultaneously on CTV in Canada on September 24, 2009.

In the episode, Michael plots to sabotage Jim's plans after Jim and David Wallace have a secret meeting without him. In the end, Jim is promoted to co-manager. Meanwhile, Dwight and Toby become suspicious of an injury Darryl supposedly got at work, and Pam tries to get RSVPs from the office for her wedding to Jim.

The episode was written by Aaron Shure and directed by Randall Einhorn. According to Nielsen ratings, "The Meeting" was seen by 7.33 million U.S. households during its original broadcast, a drop from the previous week's season premiere episode, "Gossip". The episode received mixed reviews, with some commentators claiming it focused too much on plot development rather than humor.

== Synopsis ==
Michael Scott becomes nervous when Jim Halpert has a private meeting with CFO David Wallace. He constantly tries to intrude into the meeting, finally sneaking into the meeting room in a cheese cart made by Andy Bernard. David sees Michael after finishing up with Jim, and hints that he is thinking of having Jim promoted to regional manager. Michael, not wanting to lose his position, derides Jim's management potential and shows David his personnel file (which, thanks in part to Toby's unrequited affection for Jim's fiancé Pam, is full of comments on how much Jim slacks off). David says that Jim suggested that Michael be promoted to oversee all Northeast sales, but since Michael does not think Jim can replace him as branch manager, the idea is unworkable. David asks Jim to walk him to his car, where he tells him that he has changed his mind.

Darryl Philbin, wearing a green football jersey, puts in a claim for workers' comp with Toby Flenderson, saying he fell off a ladder in the warehouse trying to reach an item and broke his leg when the ladder fell on him. Dwight Schrute overhears him and persuades Toby that Darryl's story is suspicious. They go to the warehouse, and see that the ladder he would have used is too short to reach the top shelf. Toby still is not totally convinced that Darryl is lying, but being a fan of hardboiled detective fiction, he joins Dwight in staking out Darryl's house. There they spot someone wearing a green football jersey carrying a big bag of dog food without crutches. Toby shouts an obscenity at him, but they see that the person is not Darryl and the real Darryl comes out, still on crutches. They flee the scene. Back at the office Darryl threatens to file complaints on them for yelling at his sister.

Later, Dwight and Toby head to the warehouse to apologize. There Dwight sees that employees are misusing a lift as an elevator and a railing at the top of the stairs was replaced, and deduces that Darryl injured himself on the lift and made up the ladder story since he would not receive workers' comp for an injury incurred through misuse of equipment. Darryl says if they report him for his falsified complaint, he will retaliate by filing a complaint for sexual harassment against his sister. Dwight is not swayed by the threat, and Toby tries to convince them to make peace. Later, Toby, with a bruised forehead, explains that the three of them "worked it out" that Darryl and Dwight would both file complaints against each other and Toby would do all the paperwork.

Pam Beesly and Jim scheduled their wedding for a weekend in Niagara Falls so their co-workers would be unable to attend, but Michael announced the office will be closed on the Friday and Monday either side of the wedding date. Pam tries to finalize her guest list for the wedding. Kelly Kapoor says she will only go if Ryan Howard goes, and Ryan says he will go so Pam checks off both Ryan and Kelly. Meredith Palmer asks Pam to send her directions via text message on the morning of the wedding, and says she wants the fanciest meal there, unless there are ribs.

Jim tells Michael that he suspects he talked David out of giving him the promotion. Michael denies this, so Jim pressures him to call David back and switches the phone to speaker mode as soon as David picks up. The ensuing conversation confirms Jim's suspicions, and he becomes upset that Michael sabotaged him. When Michael tries to apologize, David calls Michael back and proposes that Michael and Jim be co-managers of the Scranton branch, with Michael handling clients and Jim handling day-to-day operations. Michael and Jim accept the offer and announce it to the rest of the office. Dwight screams in anger.

== Production ==
"The Meeting" was written by Aaron Shure and directed by Randall Einhorn. The episode included the promotion that established Jim as co-manager of the office along with Michael, which for a brief time drastically changed the hierarchy of the office.

== Cultural references ==
Michael said he would have to discuss a possible promotion with his consultant from H&R Block, a tax preparation company. During an evaluation of Jim's work performance, Michael compares Jim to Big Bird, a character from the hit PBS children's show, Sesame Street. While discussing Darryl's suspicious injury, Dwight says they are not living in Sweden, which he incorrectly describes as a communist country. In response, Darryl says the injury would not be a problem there due to Sweden's universal healthcare. When Pam asks Ryan about coming to the wedding, Ryan can be seen reading the 2006 Tucker Max book, I Hope They Serve Beer in Hell.

== Reception ==
In its original American broadcast on September 24, 2009, "The Meeting" was seen by 7.33 million viewers. It received a 3.8 rating/10 share among viewers aged between 18 and 49. It marked an almost 800,000-viewer drop from the previous week's premiere episode, "Gossip", which itself was seen by 18 percent less viewers than the fifth-season premiere. "The Meeting" received generally mixed reviews, with some commentators claiming it focused too much on plot development rather than humor.

Entertainment Weekly writer Darren Franich called the episode "an instant classic". Franich said he was excited about the new co-manager plotline, and he particularly praised the cold open between Michael and Oscar, as well as the comedic chemistry between Dwight and Toby. Tara Tanzos of The Express-Times said she was interested to see where the co-manager plot development went in future episodes. She particularly praised the scene in which Michael spies on Jim and Wallace from underneath the cheese cart. Nathan Rabin of The A.V. Club said "The Meeting" advanced the show's overall plot drastically with the Michael and Jim co-manager plot, but not at the expense of humor. He particularly praised the pairing of Dwight and Toby, the look of Darryl's sister and Dwight's scream of rage at the end of the episode.

North by Northwestern writer Sarah Collins said the co-manager and wedding preparation stories were dull, despite advancing the show's plot. However, she said the Dwight and Toby subplot provided most of the episode's "high moments", and said Darryl's sister added more dimension to his character. Dan Phillips of IGN said the episode was high on plot summary but low on laughs, which he said felt like a step back after an excellent sixth-season premiere. Phillips said the biggest laughs came from the "outrageous cold opening". Yvonne Villarreal of the Los Angeles Times called "The Meeting" a lackluster episode. She said it was more low-key than recent episodes, and that "when the office antics go on the back burner, so do the laughs". Caitlin Fairchild of The Flat Hat said the episode was "not that funny", mainly because of the focus on "actual plot developments rather than ridiculous antics".
