= Company Picnic =

- The Office episode
- Episode no.: Season 5 Episode 28
- Directed by: Ken Kwapis
- Written by: Jennifer Celotta; Paul Lieberstein
- Cinematography by: Randall Einhorn
- Editing by: David Rogers
- Production code: 528
- Original air date: May 14, 2009

Guest appearances
- Amy Ryan as Holly Flax; Idris Elba as Charles Miner; Andy Buckley as David Wallace; John Hartmann as Kendall; Rob Huebel as A.J.; Ellie Kemper as Erin Hannon; Bobby Ray Shafer as Bob Vance; Brian Stack as a Buffalo branch employee; James Urbaniak as Rolf Ahl

Episode chronology
← Previous "Cafe Disco"	Next → "Gossip"
- The Office (American season 5)

"Company Picnic" is the fifth season finale of the American comedy television series The Office and the 100th overall episode of the series. It originally aired on NBC in the United States on May 14, 2009. In the episode, Michael plans to win back his ex-girlfriend Holly at a Dunder Mifflin company picnic, while the rest of the Scranton office get involved in a competitive company volleyball tournament.

The episode was written by Paul Lieberstein and Jennifer Celotta, and directed by Ken Kwapis. It marked return appearances of former guest stars Amy Ryan as Holly Flax and Idris Elba as Charles Miner. Actress Jenna Fischer is not as talented a volleyball player as she is portrayed in the episode, so some of her scenes were modified with computer-generated imagery.

The scene in which Jim and Pam discover the pregnancy includes no dialogue, and is a homage to a similar scene in the original British version of The Office, where Tim Canterbury silently proclaims his love for Dawn Tinsley. The episode also features a sketch about the history of Dunder Mifflin which parodies the film Slumdog Millionaire.

"Company Picnic" received generally positive reviews, particularly for the return of Holly and the scene in which Jim discovers Pam is pregnant. According to Nielsen ratings, the episode was watched by 6.72 million viewers. It was the lowest-rated episode of the season and had the lowest original episode rating for The Office in two years, which reviewers said was especially surprising given that it was a season finale episode.

== Plot ==
At the Dunder Mifflin company picnic, Michael Scott plans to win back his ex-girlfriend Holly Flax, whom he has not seen since she was transferred back to Nashua. Holly's boyfriend A.J. tells Michael the couple are designing a house together. CFO David Wallace asks Michael and Holly to do a presentation about the history of Dunder Mifflin, and the two spend time in the woods coming up with ideas. Jim Halpert and Pam Beesly run into Charles Miner for the first time since he left Scranton, and Charles is still short with Jim. Dwight Schrute brings his best friend, Rolf, who insults Angela Martin for breaking Dwight's heart; Dwight tells Rolf to stop. The branches of Dunder Mifflin compete in the picnic's volleyball tournament. The Scranton branch struggles until Pam reveals herself to be a very talented volleyball player. With her help, they reach the final round, where they face the corporate head office.

Michael and Holly perform a skit that parodies Slumdog Millionaire (called "SlumDunder Mifflinaire"), presenting Dunder Mifflin trivia in the form of Who Wants to Be a Millionaire?, as well as acting out torture scenes featured in the film. Nobody except Stanley Hudson finds their presentation amusing, but things take a turn for the worse when they reveal that the Buffalo branch will be closing because of the economic recession. After reluctantly confirming this news to the Buffalo staff, David berates Michael for revealing something David told him in confidence. Michael and Holly thought they already knew about it. As Michael and Holly talk about next year's presentation, he prepares to ask for her back but stops, deciding not to ruin the moment. As Holly leaves with A. J., Michael says he believes he will eventually be reunited with Holly, although potentially not for a long time, and he is "in no rush".

The Scranton branch faces off against the corporate branch, commenting that they deserve to lose for closing down Buffalo. The game is close, and Pam injures her ankle. Seeing an opportunity to remove Scranton's best player from the game, Charles insists that Pam take a seat on the grounds of her injury being a company liability. Determined to beat Charles, Jim takes Pam to a local hospital to get an X-ray while Dwight stalls the game to give them time to get back. The doctor gives Jim and Pam an update, which causes them to be ecstatic. Jim then calls Dwight to send in the substitute players.

== Production ==
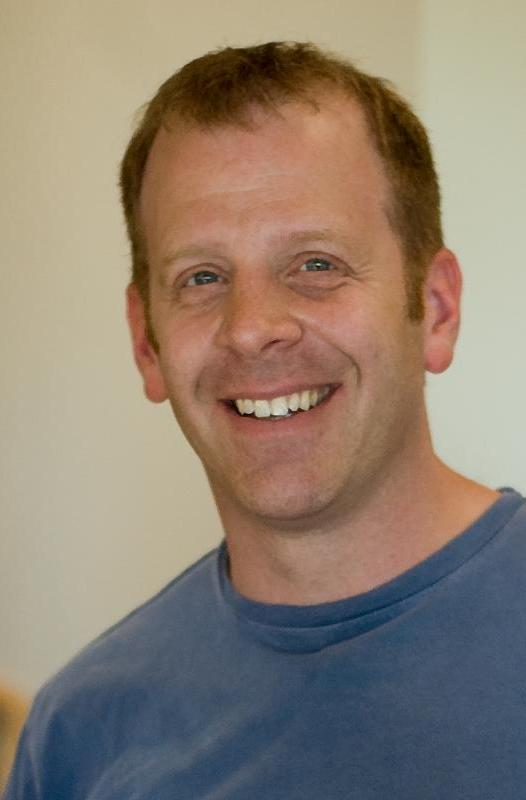
The Office actor and producer Paul Lieberstein wrote "Company Picnic" along with co-writer Jennifer Celotta.

The episode was written by Paul Lieberstein and Jennifer Celotta, and directed by Ken Kwapis. "Company Picnic" was the 100th overall episode of The Office, and show creator Greg Daniels said he was especially proud the series made it to that landmark because he felt it meant he did not disappoint Ricky Gervais and Stephen Merchant, who created the original British version of the show. Daniels said, "I remember interviewing with them seven years ago, and this (100th episode) was certainly the goal, so I'm very pleased that we got to 100 episodes in a strong fashion. I think the show is in a very good place right now." Steve Carell said he was especially pleased with the landmark because when the show began, people had doubts it would live up to the original series and were skeptical about its mockumentary style: "It's sort of remarkable, especially with this show because I don't think anybody felt it would go past the pilot. ... I think most everyone was kind of dubious about our chances of pulling it off." Likewise, Ben Silverman, co-chairman of NBC Entertainment and an Office executive producer, said, "It's a thrill that we got to 100 episodes, and probably incredibly surprising looking back at the process it took. But the reality is, we believed in it."

"Company Picnic" was filmed in Malibu, California. The episode featured about 360 extras, and was shot over the course of four days. Actor Ed Helms said of the episode, "What the writers did is really fun and creative. It doesn't boil down to passive aggressive little picnic games with a vengeance. There's a lot more going on than that." The episode marked return appearances of guest stars Amy Ryan as Holly Flax and Idris Elba as Charles Miner. Ryan said she would love the prospect of returning to The Office in future episodes, but that there were no plans for such a return at the time: "I think that door [to return] will always be open, just because it's such a nice party to go to. But that said, there are no plans any time soon for them to be reunited again."

Celotta and Lieberstein came up with the idea of setting the 100th episode at a company picnic at the beginning of the season, seeing it as a good opportunity to both show all the Dunder Mifflin branches and to bring back all the major characters. In an interview with The Office fansite "OfficeTally", Celotta said she and Lieberstein had only about one weekend to finish the script and distribute it to the actors, so there was little discussion about their individual volleyball abilities. Once the scripts were circulated, the writers learned that Jenna Fischer was not very good at volleyball and had trouble making certain motions with her arm over her head due to a previous injury. As a result, director Ken Kwapis arranged for stunt doubles to perform some of the volleyball moves; a handful of scenes were also shot with Pam doing an overhead motion with the ball being added later using computer-generated imagery. The Scranton cast in general were poor volleyball players, though the other branches included some excellent players, who at times had to pretend to be less skilled than they were. The opening credits were trimmed down to ten seconds and no post-credits scene was used in order to keep the episode within the network-mandated 21 minutes and 35 seconds. The producers considered making the episode an hour long like other season finales from past seasons, like "The Job" and "Goodbye, Toby", but they found they did not have enough plot points to conclude in "Company Picnic" and would have had trouble filling a full hour.

Precautions were taken to prevent secrets from the season finale being revealed; only certain staff members were provided with copies of the episode, which were given on watermarked DVDs and distributed to secret hiding places. An additional layer of secrecy was put around the revelation of Pam's pregnancy, with the episode's final scene not appearing in any copies of the script. The writers wanted Michael to have a big plan to get Holly back, but to realize throughout the course of the day that his relationship with Holly was something special and that he did not want to disrupt it; they felt it showed that Michael had become more mature, calm and confident about this relationship than that of Jan Levinson and others in his past. The first scene with Michael and Holly discussing their sketch possibilities in a secluded area was filmed with three cameras: one focusing on each side of the two actors, and one from the front of both of them to establish that the picnic was still going on behind them. Due to space limitations, the latter angle was filmed through a mirror (with the actors appearing to be opposite sides) and then the image was reversed and undistorted in post-production.

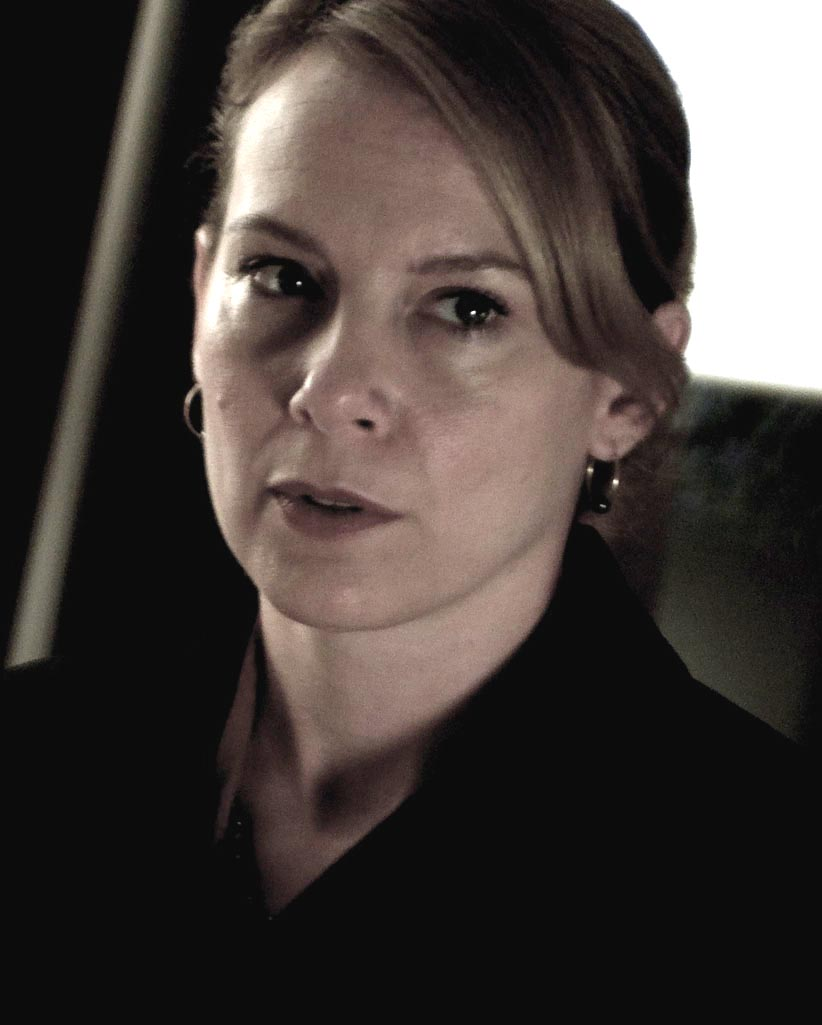
Amy Ryan reprised her recurring guest role as Holly Flax in "Company Picnic". Ryan and Carell improvised a number of moments during the "SlumDunder Mifflinaire" sketch.

Although the "SlumDunder Mifflinaire" skit and the scenes in which it was prepared were all scripted, Carell and Ryan improvised several of the moments including Michael's "Yay!" cheer upon getting an answer right, the bow Carell and Ryan take at the end while the Buffalo branch employees are angry, and Michael's Indian accent. Carell improvised with several different accents on the set, with the producers settling on the one that sounded most like the character from the film, although he used his regular accent when answering the final question in the skit. Carell and Ryan also made up the Jaws song parody ("Dunder...Dunder...") while filming, and Carell made up the subsequent line "We're circling it" about their good sketch idea. The extras were told not to laugh or react at all to the "SlumDunder Mifflinaire" sketch, but Carell and Ryan were not told of those instructions in order to create a genuine stage fright awkwardness among the two actors; Ryan in particular was thrown off guard by their lack of response.

The ending sequence with Pam and Jim in the hospital was filmed at the North Hollywood Medical Center using the Sacred Heart Hospital set from Scrubs. Although the good news Jim and Pam learn in the hospital was never specifically stated, episode writer Jen Celotta confirmed that the news was that Pam was pregnant; the script included an off-hand question from a nurse to Pam about whether she was pregnant so that viewers would make the connection later. Celotta said the idea of the pregnancy came as the writers were working on this specific episode, although she felt the show had always been heading in that direction. The series producers considered filming the scene with audible dialogue, but they thought the scene was more powerful without audio and felt actors John Krasinski and Jenna Fischer "are such great actors and have the ability to convey so much without hearing their dialogue." Celotta said the show's producers have no plans to release the scene with audio. While filming Jim Halpert's emotional reaction to the pregnancy news, Krasinski and director Ken Kwapis discussed the fact that Jim has been surrounded by this camera crew for the last five years, so he would be glad to share this moment with them. The moment when Jim looked directly at the camera, in particular, was meant to convey the idea that he was celebrating the news with the crew. The script did not call for tears, but Krasinski cried naturally as part of his performance.

Lieberstein and Celotta originally planned to have Mose Schrute, Dwight's cousin and a popular minor character, appear in the episode along with Dwight, but actor Michael Schur was unable to attend because he was busy directing "Rock Show", the first-season finale of the NBC series Parks and Recreation, which Schur co-created along with The Office creator Greg Daniels. Instead, the writers created the role of Rolf, and several of the actors suggested James Urbaniak be cast in the role. Celotta said she intends to have both Urbaniak and Schur come back to the show in future episodes; she said of Schur, "Who knew Mose would run a show some day? We'll get him one of these days, rest assured." Jennie Tan, the creator of The Office fansite OfficeTally.com, appeared as an extra during the picnic scenes; her site has grown so large she has become known by the cast and crew of the show, who invited her to appear on the season finale. Brian Stack, a writer and actor on Late Night with Conan O'Brien and The Tonight Show with Conan O'Brien, had a small role as the Buffalo branch employee who yells angrily at David Wallace. The Office editor Dave Rogers makes a cameo appearance as the volleyball player who tells Andy he is wearing expensive sunglasses. After filming wrapped, the cast and crew held a 100th episode party, where Dave Rogers presented a montage of "100 Moments" of The Office, with one moment from each episode.

When the Pam character discusses her impressive volleyball ability, she says she played volleyball in junior high, senior high, college and went to volleyball camps most summers. However, in the episode "Job Fair", she said her high school gym brings back memories of her faking PMS to get out of playing basketball and volleyball. Writer Jen Celotta acknowledged this was a continuity error: "Yeah, we screwed up. I didn't remember that she said that, specifically about volleyball. And we really do try to be careful about those things."

The official website for The Office included three cut scenes from "Company Picnic" within a week of its original release. The first clip, one minute and fifty seconds long, is an extended sequence of company picnic scenes, including Michael talking about how excited he is to see Holly, Stanley convincing Creed to stand in his sunlight to provide shade, and Dwight and Andy mocking the Utica team by calling them "You-sucks-ti-ca!" The clip also featured a brief appearance of Meredith's son Jake, played by Spencer Daniels, who has not appeared in the show since the second season episode, "Take Your Daughter to Work Day"; after he rudely and pointedly addresses her by her first name, Meredith orders him to spend the picnic locked in their car. In the second one-minute long deleted scene clip, Andy yells at his volleyball teammates when they make a mistake, a Buffalo branch player snaps at his own team, and Charles makes fun of Jim from the sidelines. In the third 30-second clip, Dwight bullies and pesters everyone about the final point of the volleyball game against corporate, prompting Meredith to throw the game by throwing the ball at Dwight during her serve. Within a week of the original broadcast of "Company Picnic", the official NBC store website made the red Scranton branch T-shirts and black New York City corporate T-shirts worn by characters in the episode available for sale.

== Cultural references ==
Holly and Michael act out a sketch inspired by Slumdog Millionaire, including the torture scenes from that film.

The "SlumDunder Mifflinaire" sketch is a reference to the 2008 film Slumdog Millionaire; references to the film included the game show Who Wants to Be a Millionaire, the torture scenes intercut with the game show and Carell's impersonation of Slumdog actor Dev Patel's voice. Before settling on Slumdog Millionaire, Michael and Holly considered writing Dunder Mifflin-themed parodies of the 1975 Steven Spielberg film Jaws and the 1985 science fiction adventure film Back to the Future. While discussing the Jaws idea, they hum John Williams' Jaws "Main Title" song, substituting the famous two-note theme with the words "Dunder...Dunder..." During the sketch, Michael and Holly announce the closing of a Dunder Mifflin branch in Buffalo, the second largest city in the state of New York. Alan Pergament of The Buffalo News said of the city's inclusion in the episode, "It ruined the party for the Buffalo workers but made the episode a lot of fun, especially for Buffalo viewers." Holly and A.J. come from the Dunder Mifflin branch in Nashua, New Hampshire.

Michael compared his relationship to Holly to that of the protagonists in the 1989 romantic comedy, When Harry Met Sally.... "Company Picnic" writer Jennifer Celotta said the final scene with Jim and Pam reacting to her pregnancy while the cameras film from outside the hospital room was an homage to a scene in the British version of The Office. In that scene, Tim Canterbury proclaims his love for Dawn Tinsley in a meeting room, but Tim turns off his microphone first so the cameras pick up only their reactions and no sound. Celotta said of the scene, "We are all big fans of the moment that Tim takes off his mic and tells Dawn how he feels. Such an intimate moment that, to me, it feels like it's nice to have it just be theirs."

== Reception ==
In its original American broadcast on May 14, 2009, "Company Picnic" was watched by 6.72 million viewers, according to Nielsen ratings. It was the lowest original episode rating for The Office in two years, a fact commentators said was especially surprising given that the episode was a season finale. The rating was a 13 percent drop in viewership from the previous week's episode, "Cafe Disco", which was seen by 7.71 million viewers. It also unseated "Casual Friday", which was seen by 7.3 million viewers, as the lowest-rated episode of the fifth season. "Company Picnic" received a 3.9 rating/12 share among viewers aged between 18 and 34, and a 3.5 rating/9 share among viewers between 18 and 49.

Alan Sepinwall of The Star-Ledger described the episode as "a great end to what may have been my favorite season of The Office to date." He said the episode included great laughs and sublime dramatic moments, including Michael's moment with Holly after the sketch and the silent moment in which Jim learns Pam is pregnant. Sepinwall said Jim's moment of composing himself in the hallway after calling Dwight in that scene was, "Maybe Krasinski's single best moment on the series to date." Margaret Lyons of Entertainment Weekly said she had "some mixed feelings" about the episode and wished it had more from Ryan, Creed and Kelly, but she especially praised the ending scene with Jim and Pam, which she said she did not expect. Dan Hooper of VH1's Best Week Ever said, "Office finale was awesome, as we expected, capping about seven straight weeks of just top-notch episodes with great character moments, a legitimately interesting plot, and just laugh line after laugh line, reminding us all [why] we spent time talking about this show every week." Hooper also praised NBC for not advertising the twist ending: "They didn’t stupidly dramatize it, and it ended up being a really nice, really fitting end" to the season.

Nathin Rabin of The A.V. Club, who gave the episode a B+ grade, said it was "long on pathos and awkwardness but short on laughs", but described it as "a very satisfying way to end a very satisfying season". Although Rabin said the final scene with Jim and Pam was filmed and handled artfully, he also expressed concern that the subplot could turn into a clichéd device, and said "part of me felt it was a rather pat, heavy-handed way of ending the season on a dramatic note." Will Leitch of New York magazine expressed concern about the dangers of television shows adding a pregnancy subplot, but said of the episode, "For now, we’ll bask in the happiness of two main characters who have waited a long time for it." Leitch, who called Holly the show's "most beloved guest star", also complimented the way the episode handled Michael and Holly's brief reunion: "The couple and the producers seem to have come to the same conclusion about this relationship: Holly (Amy Ryan) can’t actually stay with Michael (Steve Carell), so let’s just enjoy her while she’s here." Travis Fickett of IGN complimented the episode but said it "doesn't really reach that high", which he said was disappointing following a string of eventful episodes. He praised the Holly character and the way Jim and Dwight worked so well together during the volleyball game, and although he said the final scene was a nice moment between Jim and Pam, he also said the twist was "predictable and telegraphed".

TV Guide listed the final scene about Pam's pregnancy as one of the twelve top television moments from the week it aired. "Company Picnic" was voted the ninth highest-rated episode out of 26 from the fifth season, according to an episode poll at the fansite OfficeTally; the episode was rated 8.36 out of 10.
