= Double Date (The Office) =

- The Office episode
- Episode no.: Season 6 Episode 9
- Directed by: Seth Gordon
- Written by: Charlie Grandy
- Cinematography by: Matt Sohn
- Editing by: Claire Scanlon
- Production code: 609
- Original air date: November 5, 2009

Guest appearances
- Linda Purl as Helene Beesly

Episode chronology
← Previous "Koi Pond"	Next → "Murder"
- The Office (American season 6)

"Double Date" is the ninth episode of the sixth season of the American comedy series The Office and the show's 109th episode overall. It was written by Charlie Grandy and directed by Seth Gordon. It originally aired on NBC on November 5, 2009.

The series—presented as if it were a real documentary—depicts the everyday lives of office employees in the Scranton, Pennsylvania, branch of the fictional Dunder Mifflin Paper Company. In this episode, Jim and Pam finally go on a double date with Michael and Pam's mother Helene on Helene's birthday, which takes a dark turn when Michael discovers just how old Helene is turning, and breaks up with her. Meanwhile, Dwight offers to do nice things for all the members of the office so that they will owe him a specific favor, but Andy ruins his plans.

== Plot ==
Jim Halpert and Pam Halpert have constantly tried to avoid social contact with Michael Scott and Helene, Pam's mother. However, Pam relents on the occasion of Helene's birthday, saying there is "no way out." Pam is disgusted that Michael picked a childhood restaurant that she likes (she snaps that maybe Michael will start dating her favorite meal from there as well) and registered the group as the "Scott family." But when Pam sees that her mother is really happy with Michael, and he in return is extremely charming and loving to Helene, she ultimately starts to warm up to the thought of their dating. However, when Michael learns that Helene is turning 58 and is not interested in traveling or going white-water rafting, he worries that the romance between them will be boring and mundane. Michael points out their differences, saying he wants to do certain activities while he still can, and breaks up with Helene right in the middle of her birthday lunch, as Pam and Jim watch in horror.

Back at the office, Michael tries to bribe a furious Pam with a raise, but when she figures out his scheme, he asks her what she wants. Pam decides that she wants to hit Michael in the parking lot with everyone watching, to which Michael nervously agrees. Toby Flenderson makes sure that Pam will hit Michael off company property, and helps her work on her punching technique. Ryan Howard and Kelly Kapoor warn Michael that Pam has "crazy pregnancy strength." That afternoon in the parking lot, Michael initially winces at Pam's attempts to hit him before sincerely apologizing about the whole ordeal. Pam orders Michael never to date another member of her family again, and he agrees. As Pam walks away, Michael protests that Helene came onto him, and Pam slaps him in the face, to the shock of the rest of the office. As the group disperses, Pam admits to Jim that he was correct; hitting Michael did not make her feel better.

Dwight Schrute is strangely doing nice things, such as buying New York bagels for everyone in the office and cleaning out the refrigerator in the office kitchen. He is actually trying to make everyone in the office indebted to him so that he can later cash in the favors by demanding they help him get Jim fired. He becomes annoyed when Andy Bernard immediately returns his favors, polishing Dwight's briefcase and buying everyone lunch. Everyone else in the office eventually returns Dwight's favors in the form of a Starbucks gift card, and Dwight is infuriated that he wasted his day. At the end of the episode, Dwight is icing Michael's face after he got hit by Pam, and Michael says to Dwight: “I owe you one.” Dwight interprets this literally and says he wants Jim fired. Michael refuses, and Dwight storms off.

== Reception ==
This episode was watched by 8.1 million viewers, with a 4.1 rating and a 10 share in the 18–49 demographic.
