= Sabre (The Office) =

- The Office episode
- Episode no.: Season 6 Episode 15
- Directed by: John Krasinski
- Written by: Jennifer Celotta
- Cinematography by: Randall Einhorn
- Editing by: David Rogers
- Production code: 615
- Original air date: February 4, 2010

Guest appearances
- Kathy Bates as Jo Bennett; Andy Buckley as David Wallace; Nelson Franklin as Nick; Joey Slotnick as Jerry; Jean Villepique as Rachel Wallace; Christian Slater as himself; Zach Woods as Gabe Lewis

Episode chronology
← Previous "The Banker"	Next → "The Manager and the Salesman"
- The Office (American season 6)

"Sabre" is the fifteenth episode of the sixth season of the American comedy television series The Office and the show's 115th episode overall. The episode was directed by John Krasinski, his directorial debut for the series, and written by Jennifer Celotta. It originally aired on NBC on February 4, 2010.

The series, presented in a mockumentary style, depicts the everyday lives of office employees at the Scranton, Pennsylvania branch of the fictional Dunder Mifflin Paper Company. In the episode, Michael (Steve Carell) has difficulties accepting the policies of Sabre, the new parent company of Dunder Mifflin. Meanwhile, Jim (John Krasinski) and Pam (Jenna Fischer) visit a prestigious daycare, hoping to reserve a spot for their child with whom Pam is pregnant. The episode achieved a viewership of 7.36 during its initial airing in the United States.

The episode marks the first appearance of Kathy Bates as Jo Bennett, the CEO of Sabre. The episode received positive views from critics, who highlighted Bates's introduction in particular as a strong point. Beginning with this episode, Ed Helms is added to the opening credits.

== Synopsis ==
The branches of Dunder Mifflin have been taken over by a company called Sabre (which the staff in the Scranton office believe is pronounced "sah-bray"), and Gabe Lewis, the coordinating director for emerging regions from Sabre, arrives at the Scranton branch to greet them. Michael Scott has everyone give him a standing ovation and Andy Bernard and Erin Hannon sing a Scranton-themed parody of "Party in the U.S.A." by Miley Cyrus to impress him, but it ends in awkwardness when it becomes clear that the lyrics are based on the incorrect pronunciation of Sabre's name. In a conference room meeting, Gabe shows an introductory video of Sabre, a company that primarily sells printers, starring Christian Slater and then shares some of the company's new policies, including the use of reusable drink containers, fewer vacation weeks, and site blocking of time-wasting sites like YouTube and Twitter, which is done in the background by IT assistant Nick. Michael is resistant to the changes and requests a meeting with Gabe's superiors. Michael engages in a video chat with Sabre CEO Jo Bennett and expresses concerns about the new policies. Bennett replies that those policies came under a mismanaged company and that Michael would have "until the end of the day" to decide what he wants, and when he resists she says bluntly, "I would take until the end of the day if I were you". Frustrated, Michael leaves the office to visit former Dunder Mifflin Chief Financial Officer David Wallace for advice.

Jim Halpert and Pam Halpert visit the most prestigious daycare center in the area with hopes of impressing the director. Jim enters a bathroom and sees the day care director Jerry on the toilet. Jim and Pam agree not to bring up the incident during the interview, but when the interview goes poorly Pam directly asks Jerry if this has to do with Jim walking in on him. Jerry denies this, and when Pam refuses to let the subject drop, he makes veiled insults. When Jim retaliates by making fun of Jerry using a child's bathroom and asks why he never locked the door, Jerry explains that the bathroom door does not lock for the children's safety.

Andy and Erin conduct interviews with the film crew, and each admit interest in dating. However, Andy thinks that the "ball is in Erin's court" since he already did his part with his last spectacular display involving a band drumline, while Erin assumes that Andy will continue to take the active role in their courtship. Andy tries hinting to Erin to ask him out by inquiring about her weekend plans, but Erin assumes he is leading up to ask her out and eagerly tells him she has nothing planned. Andy exits with exasperation.

Michael arrives unannounced at David Wallace's home, and finds that he has not shaved nor done anything productive recently, instead aimlessly spending time at his home. David's son plays the drums in the living room, while David's wife provides hints that David should begin looking for work. Michael and David go in the hot tub, where Michael asks him how he should handle the changes at Sabre. David has no advice and instead asks Michael to join him on his proposed business venture "Suck It", a vacuum that collects children's toys. Michael, shocked at David's nonchalant and aimless demeanor, leaves and expresses concerns for David's well-being to the camera crew.

Michael, realizing that there is no point in opposing Sabre, returns to the office and proclaims his allegiance to Sabre and its new policies. He proposes a toast with orange juice in the metallic Sabre bottles to the new management, which after drinking claims it's like drinking a battery. The episode closes with a vignette of David Wallace and his son playing a jingle for the "Suck It" toy vacuum.

== Reception ==
This episode was watched by 7.36 million viewers, with a 3.8 rating and a 10 share in the 18–49 demographic rising 3% from the last original episode helping it come in second in its timeslot and the most viewed episode of Comedy Night Done Right. The episode got mostly positive reviews from critics. Dan Phillips of IGN gave the episode an 8.5, saying it was "Great" and that "The episode isn't the funniest of the season, but it is fun to see the show gear up for its next extended story arc. Whether or not the writers are really implying that we're all a little like Michael, it's clear they're once again casting him as the goofy hero, one who will help resist these new stuffy bosses in his uniquely funny ways. And at the very least, there's great potential in having Bates and Steve Carell square off for a run of episodes." Nathan Rabin of The A.V. Club gave it a A− saying that "Wrestling with terrifying new financial realities has helped keep the show relevant and lively well into its sixth season. I'm excited about this current arc and look forward to more appearances from Kathy Bates, who did an awful lot with very little screen time as the faux-folksy, semi-terrifying head of Sabre."
