= JK Wedding Entrance Dance =

2009 viral video

"JK Wedding Entrance Dance" is an American viral video originally uploaded to YouTube on July 19, 2009, featuring the wedding of Jillian Peterson and Kevin Heinz, using "Forever" by Chris Brown as the song for their wedding march. In its first 48 hours, the video accumulated more than 3.5 million views. The original upload of the video was the third most popular video on YouTube in 2009, and as of July 2021 had been viewed over 100 million times. Time magazine ranked the video at number fifteen on its list of the fifty greatest YouTube videos.

== Synopsis ==
The video begins with ushers closing the church doors with everything appearing normal, getting ready for the start of a wedding. "Forever" by Chris Brown then begins to play. To the surprise of the audience, the ushers, groomsmen and bridesmaids then progressively dance down the aisle, culminating in the groom, Kevin Heinz, tumbling through the group. Ultimately, Jill Peterson dances down the aisle, eventually met by her husband-to-be. According to Peterson, "[they practiced for] an hour and a half" the Thursday before the ceremony.

The wedding occurred on June 20, 2009, at Christ Lutheran Church, in Saint Paul, Minnesota, United States. The video was posted on YouTube a month after the wedding at the request of the bride's father who wanted to share it with relatives who were not there. Tommy Alsop recorded the video.

== Outcome ==
On July 26, 2009, sales of Chris Brown's 2008 song "Forever" reached number 4 on iTunes and number 3 on Amazon.com following the post. Due to the controversy regarding Chris Brown and Rihanna, the married couple set up a charitable contribution effort on their website for donating funds to the Sheila Wellstone Institute, an organization whose efforts are to end domestic violence. Two months after the appearance of the video, donations had reached $16,000.

== Parodies and media ==
Peterson told Good Morning America,

"I grew up dancing and I danced in college. It was something I always wanted to do. I wanted to dance in on the wedding. And Kevin jumped in on board."

Peterson and Heinz appeared on The Today Show on July 25, 2009, to talk about the video. The entire wedding party re-created the wedding entrance dance on stage live the next day.

In Australia, the remaining contestants plus guests recreated the wedding dance on Dancing with the Stars.

The wedding dance was recreated in the "Niagara" episode of U.S. TV series The Office. All main characters, except the bride and groom themselves, participated in the dance down the aisle. According to Peterson and Heinz, they had no idea the show was going to recreate their wedding dance, and "nearly passed out" when they saw it.

The Nevada Humane Society in Reno has produced a video take-off, celebrating the adoption of a dog from the shelter, to tie in with their campaign to find "Forever Homes" for animals. NHS officials tell the Reno Gazette Journal the video has gotten 40,000 hits on their website at nevadahumanesociety.org since posting the video July 22, 2010.

On April 15, 2011, T-Mobile uploaded a video parody of the JK Wedding Entrance Dance portraying the wedding of Prince William and Catherine Middleton weeks before the actual Royal Wedding. The music used for the choreography was East 17's "House of Love". The video, which was shot in London, had portrayed mostly recognized personalities related to the actual Royal Wedding such as Rowan Williams (the Archbishop of Canterbury who conducted the Royal Wedding marriage ceremony), the Duke of Edinburgh (William's grandfather), the Queen (William's grandmother), Michael and Carole Middleton (Catherine's parents), the Prince of Wales and Duchess of Cornwall (William's father, son of the Queen, and step-mother), Pippa Middleton (Catherine's sister and bridesmaid), Prince Harry (William's brother and best man), Prince William and Catherine Middleton (now the Prince and Princess of Wales). T-Mobile stated in their video's YouTube account, "lifesforsharing", that they wished William and Catherine a long and happy marriage.
