= The Banker (The Office) =

- The Office episode
- Episode no.: Season 6 Episode 14
- Directed by: Jeffrey Blitz
- Written by: Jason Kessler
- Cinematography by: Matt Sohn
- Editing by: David Rogers; Claire Scanlon; Michael Zurer
- Production code: 612
- Original air date: January 21, 2010

Guest appearance
- David Costabile as Eric Ward

Episode chronology
| ← Previous "Secret Santa" | Next → "Sabre" |
- The Office (American season 6)

"The Banker" is the fourteenth episode of the sixth season of the American comedy series The Office and the show's 114th episode overall. It aired on NBC on January 21, 2010. It was written by Jason Kessler and directed by Jeffrey Blitz.

In this episode, an investment banker comes to the office to speak with HR rep Toby Flenderson (Paul Lieberstein), since the company has recently been bought out. The episode is a clip show featuring montages of episodes past, as the banker asks about events in the office.

The episode "The Banker" received mixed reviews from critics and 3.7/9 in the 18–49 demographic.

== Synopsis ==
When an investment banker, Eric Ward, comes to Dunder Mifflin Scranton to check for any discrepancies, Michael Scott, Dwight Schrute, Andy Bernard, and Pam Halpert pull out all the stops in hopes of impressing him with their high-profile contacts. Michael—now the highest-ranking employee of Dunder-Mifflin, since all of Corporate in New York City have been removed—flagrantly lies to make the office look more "attractive," including pretending to have an AI assistant named Computron, replacing Stanley Hudson with a more cheerful man, and having Dwight pretend to be the HR rep to keep Toby Flenderson from telling him about the office's problems. Toby returns to speak with the banker, and he struggles to evade the fact-checker's questions. As they go over a list of potential liabilities, viewers are shown plenty of instances where the staff have destroyed property, engaged in dangerous activities and office romance, time wasting and conflict. It ends with clips where the office has come together as a family, including numerous moments in Jim and Pam's romance.

== Production ==
The episode was written by Jason Kessler and directed by Jeffrey Blitz, who directed five previous episodes of the series, including "Stress Relief". "The Banker" is the only clip show of the series.

== Reception ==
In its original American broadcast, "The Banker" was viewed by an estimated 7.29 million households, with a 3.7 rating/9 share in the 18–49 demographic falling 12% from the last episode.

Dan Phillips of IGN said the episode was "Passable" and gave it a 6.5/10 saying that "If you're a fan of the show, you'll no doubt find it at least somewhat charming and entertaining to re-watch many of the show's funnier moments in rapid succession. I know I did. In the end, though, the biggest shortcoming of 'The Banker' isn't simply that it's a cheap clip show, but that it's not even an inspired take on the clip show." Steve Heisler of The A.V. Club gave the episode a C+ saying that "'The Banker' was hardly an episode at all, but rather a clip show. Why does The Office need a clip show now? Are ratings really that low? Perhaps after six seasons and amidst the most rock-solid Thursday comedy line-up in years, people have simply forgotten what's been happening in Scranton and needed a refresher. Whatever. I'll take an Office clip show over almost anything on CBS any day, even though I still think it's a cop-out. (See what I did there?)"
