= The Manager and the Salesman =

- The Office episode
- Episode no.: Season 6 Episode 16
- Directed by: Marc Webb
- Written by: Mindy Kaling
- Cinematography by: Matt Sohn
- Editing by: Claire Scanlon
- Production code: 616
- Original air date: February 11, 2010

Guest appearances
- Kathy Bates as Jo Bennett; Nelson Franklin as Nick; Zach Woods as Gabe Lewis

Episode chronology
← Previous "Sabre"	Next → "The Delivery"
- The Office (American season 6)

"The Manager and the Salesman" (alternatively titled "Manager and Salesman") is the sixteenth episode of the sixth season of the American comedy television series The Office and the show's 116th episode overall. Written by Mindy Kaling and directed by Marc Webb, it first aired in the United States on NBC on February 11, 2010.

The series, presented in a mockumentary format, depicts the everyday lives of office employees at the Scranton, Pennsylvania branch of the fictional Dunder Mifflin Paper Company. In the episode, new CEO Jo Bennett (Kathy Bates) visits the Scranton branch and insists that either Michael (Steve Carell) or Jim (John Krasinski) step down from co-manager to salesman, while Dwight (Rainn Wilson) and Ryan (B. J. Novak) conspire to get Jim demoted. The episode achieved a viewership of 7.44 million during its initial airing in the United States.

== Synopsis ==
The office is eager to welcome Sabre CEO Jo Bennett to Scranton, and are dazzled by her Southern ways. Jo announces that in addition to paper, the Dunder Mifflin branches will now sell Sabre printers. When Jo finds out about the two branch managers, she says either Michael Scott or Jim Halpert must go back to being a salesman. Both are initially reluctant to be demoted, but Pam Halpert points out to Jim in the Sabre manual that since Sabre has multiple incentive programs and no cap on sales commissions, he would make much more money being demoted back to salesman. Jim tells Michael that he will go back to sales and Michael can keep his sole manager spot, and Michael is delighted. However, when Michael learns about the sales commission benefit from Oscar Martinez, he sweet talks Jo into demoting him instead. She complies to his demands due to his greater experience, and Michael gloats to Jim.

Meanwhile, Andy Bernard decides to give Erin Hannon a Valentine's Day card as a way of getting her to ask him out. However, to avoid suspicion, he gives one to everyone in the office. Erin receives a friendly one from him, but Kelly Kapoor accidentally gets a much more romantic one. Kelly is touched and shows Erin, who is surprised and disappointed. Kelly develops a romantic crush on Andy and publicly kisses him. Learning of his mistake, he sends out an email to everyone in the office claiming that he does not like any of them more than a friend. An angered Kelly confronts him, and he admits that there is one person whom he likes, but does not say who. Erin is relieved that he does not like Kelly in that way.

As Michael sets up his desk at the sales section, Dwight Schrute calls a meeting with Ryan Howard to think of ways to take Jim down. Ryan angers Dwight with his tardiness and The Lord of the Rings references. They ultimately try getting Nick, the new IT worker, to give them Jim's computer password, but he refuses. Meanwhile, Michael has a difficult time adjusting back to sales, particularly since he can no longer command Erin's services and is exposed to Phyllis Vance's noxious flatulence, a side effect of her new allergy medication. He confides to Jim that he wants the manager job back and they both tell Jo. While frustrated by their fickleness, she allows them to switch. Michael and Erin celebrate his return to his office, and Dwight taunts Jim about his demotion. In a return to his old ways, Jim dips Dwight's tie in his coffee while Pam grins, prompting Dwight to yell “Michael!”

At the end of the episode, Dwight and Ryan decide to go out for drinks to celebrate Jim's demotion, but they instead end up arguing about where to go.

== Reception ==
In its original American broadcast, "Manager and Salesman" was watched by 7.44 million viewers, with a 3.7 rating and a 10 share in the 18–49 demographic. Dan Phillips of IGN gave the episode a 7.9 saying it was "Good" and "But again, even with all the episode's strengths, it's impossible not to look at the way it teases at new possibilities with a little frustration and regret. At the very least I would have loved to see Michael on the sales floor for a few more episodes."
