= Niagara (The Office) =

- The Office episodes
- Michael leads the office in the JK Wedding Entrance Dance
- Episode nos.: Season 6 Episodes 4/5
- Directed by: Paul Feig
- Written by: Greg Daniels; Mindy Kaling
- Cinematography by: Randall Einhorn
- Editing by: Claire Scanlon
- Production code: 604/605
- Original air date: October 8, 2009
- Running time: 44 minutes

Guest appearances
- Linda Purl as Helene Beesly; Anna Camp as Penny Beesly; Kelen Coleman as Isabel Poreba; Tug Coker as Pete Halpert; Michelle Gunn as the hotel receptionist; Rick Overton as William Beesly; Robert Pine as Gerald Halpert; Blake Robbins as Tom Halpert; Bobby Ray Shafer as Bob Vance; Perry Smith as Betsy Halpert; Peggy Stewart as Sylvia

Episode chronology
← Previous "The Promotion"	Next → "Mafia"
- The Office (American season 6)

"Niagara" is a two-part episode of the sixth season of the American comedy series The Office. It is the 4th and 5th episodes in the season's episode count and the 104th and 105th episode of the series overall. The episode was written by executive producer Greg Daniels and Mindy Kaling, and was directed by Paul Feig. It originally aired on October 8, 2009 on NBC in the United States.

The episode revolves around the wedding of Jim and Pam at Niagara Falls. Not all goes smoothly when Jim accidentally reveals Pam's pregnancy to all the guests, including Pam's very old-fashioned grandmother, and Andy injures his scrotum while dancing. Meanwhile, Michael and Dwight both try to hook up with women, with mixed results.

The episode was met with positive reviews and came to be considered a classic episode of the series. In a poll conducted by OfficeTally at the end of season six, the episode was named the second best episode of the series after the second-season finale, "Casino Night." The episode was viewed by 9.42 million households with a 4.8 rating/12% share in the 18–49 demographic making it the second highest viewed episode of the season after "The Delivery."

== Plot ==
Jim Halpert and Pam Beesly head up to Niagara Falls for their wedding and the rest of the office follows them. Kevin Malone and Oscar Martinez meet Pam's sister Penny, who accidentally offends Oscar by thinking Kevin was his boyfriend Gil. Pam's mother Helene is disturbed that her ex-husband, William, has come to the wedding with his new girlfriend who is half his age.

Pam's grandmother Sylvia, known as "Meemaw", is a woman of conservative morals, so everyone is told not to mention Pam's pregnancy. At the rehearsal dinner, Jim gives a moving toast to his wife-to-be. However, he finishes by saying that everyone but Pam will drink to the toast "for obvious reasons". Meemaw questions this remark, and after fumbling through several weak excuses Jim finally admits that Pam is pregnant. Meemaw decides not to attend the wedding out of moral outrage. Michael Scott later visits Meemaw in her hotel room. Despite his indelicate approach to the subject of sex, he establishes a rapport with Meemaw and convinces her to attend the wedding.

Andy Bernard hosts a dance party in his room that night. He punctures his scrotum trying to do a split. The guests rouse Pam, the only sober person, to take him to the hospital. Pam reluctantly agrees, but Andy still insults her throughout the drive.

Dwight Schrute and Michael seek women to hook up with at the bar. Dwight, by using sexual innuendo, gets Pam's friend Isabel to spend the night with him. Michael spends the night alone in the ice machine room, having thought the "room block" at the hotel meant pre-reserved rooms for the wedding guests, not a bulk discounted room rate, and thus failed to make a reservation.

Prior to the ceremony, Pam accidentally tears her veil and tearfully phones Jim. They meet in private, where Pam expresses shame at her appearance due to being pregnant. Pam is uplifted when Jim cuts his tie in half in an effort to console her, and says she regrets inviting their families and the office staff. They run away from the church together.

While everyone in the church wonders where they went, Michael and Helene bond over their failed relationships. Dwight callously rebuffs Isabel's attempts at further contact. The rest of the office staff grow impatient, bickering about their right to take their gifts back.

Jim and Pam finally return to the church with no explanation of their absence, and the ceremony begins. The guests interrupt the ceremony by recreating the dance routines featured in the JK Wedding Entrance Dance. Jim and Pam react with uncharacteristic good humor, having already been married on board the Maid of the Mist IV ferry boat by the ship's captain, below the falls. Jim explains to the camera that he had prepared the ferry marriage in advance after seeing the video, predicting the guests might imitate it.

When Kevin leaves his only pair of shoes in the care of hotel staff, the management incinerates them as a health hazard, and he replaces them with Kleenex tissue boxes. Kevin soothes his feet in the ice machine. While he speaks to the camera crew, Helene pulls Michael into her hotel room.

== Production ==
The episode was written by Greg Daniels and Mindy Kaling, who plays Kelly Kapoor on the show, and directed by Paul Feig, his 13th directing credit for the series. Feig had more experience than most in directing episodes key to Jim and Pam's relationship, and in particular had directed "Weight Loss", in which Jim and Pam became engaged. The episode was initially assigned to Kaling, but Daniels said he was interested in contributing.

For the cold open, the Office prop department prepared a different fake vomit mixture for each character, to emulate how vomit widely varies in appearance depending on the contents of the person's stomach. Similarly to the characters, Claire Scanlon found the scene so gross that she vomited while editing it.

The exteriors were all filmed on location in Niagara Falls, New York (the episode's setting), while the interiors of the hotel were shot in the Sportsmen's Lodge in Los Angeles. The crew were unable to charter Maid of the Mist, so in order to film there they had to purchase tour tickets and arrange to have the first floor bow to themselves so that regular passengers would not interrupt the filming.

The actress who played Helene Beesly in "Sexual Harassment", Shannon Cochran, was unavailable due to touring with the play August: Osage County, leaving the production team no choice but to recast the part. Linda Purl played Helene in this episode, and for the remainder of the series.

The receptionist offering Kevin a complimentary breakfast, and Kevin's response, were improvised by the actors.

The scene in which Jim cuts his tie was inspired by something a friend of Daniels did at his wedding. The groom's sister accidentally broke some of the wedding china and was inconsolable with guilt. Finally the groom took the rest of the wedding china, deliberately smashed it in front of her, and said he did not care about the china and just wanted her to have a good time at the wedding. The scene took seven takes. Pam's line "I know way too much about Andy's scrotum" was improvised by actress Jenna Fischer.

The dance down the church aisle was choreographed by Mary Ann Kellogg, who had previously choreographed the dance sequences in the episode "Cafe Disco".

== Cultural references ==
The dance down the church aisle to Chris Brown's "Forever" is based on the 2009 YouTube viral video, "JK Wedding Entrance Dance", in which a young couple (JK, standing for "Jill and Kevin") dance down the aisle to the song along with their wedding party. Pam mentions that the song was specifically put on a "Do Not Play List", but was choreographed by the wedding guests and office workers regardless. The song played during Andy's party is Kardinal Offishall's "Numba 1 (Tide is High)" featuring Rihanna. Dwight is shown wearing the Three Wolf Moon T-shirt, made famous by humorous reviews on Amazon, before going out to the hotel bar with Michael to pick up women, commenting that "it's suggestive to women, because of howling during sex."

== Reception ==
In its original American broadcast, "Niagara" was viewed by an estimated 9.42 million households, with a 4.8 rating and a 12 share in the 18–49 demographic coming second in its timeslot after Grey's Anatomy. Greg Daniels and Mindy Kaling received a Primetime Emmy Award nomination for Outstanding Writing for a Comedy Series for their work on "Niagara" at the 62nd Primetime Emmy Awards, but lost to Modern Family's Steven Levitan and Christopher Lloyd for their work on the pilot episode.

The episode received positive reviews from critics. The episode ranked 24th on BuddyTV's list of best 50 episodes of 2009 with them saying "It wasn't easy, but they did it all, creating a goofy, joyful, and special day for Jim and Pam that brought tears to our eyes." Dan Phillips of IGN gave the episode an 8.3 saying calling it "Impressive" and "The episode certainly could have delivered more in terms of creativity and high comedy, but it still contained a great deal of entertainment." Despite that, he said the episode failed in comparison to "Phyllis' Wedding". Nathan Rabin of The A.V. Club gave the episode a B. "Niagara" was voted the second highest rated out of 115 from the series through season six, according to a poll at the fansite OfficeTally.
