= Gossip (The Office) =

- The Office episode
- Episode no.: Season 6 Episode 1
- Directed by: Paul Lieberstein
- Written by: Paul Lieberstein
- Cinematography by: Matt Sohn
- Editing by: David Rogers
- Production code: 601
- Original air date: September 17, 2009

Guest appearance
- Max Carver as Eric

Episode chronology
← Previous "Company Picnic"	Next → "The Meeting"
- The Office (American season 6)

"Gossip" is the sixth season premiere of the American comedy television series The Office and the 101st overall episode of the series. It originally aired on NBC in the United States on September 17, 2009. The episode was written and directed by Paul Lieberstein. It features Max Carver, Kelii Miyata and Elvy Yost in guest appearances as Dunder Mifflin's summer interns.

In the episode, Michael spreads a rumor about Stanley having an affair, then spreads a series of false rumors to try to convince everyone the original rumor was not true. The rumors cause Andy to question his sexuality, and Pam and Jim to debate whether or not to tell the office that Pam is pregnant.

"Gossip" confirmed the fact that protagonist Pam was pregnant, which was strongly hinted in the fifth season finale, "Company Picnic". "Gossip" was the first episode to feature Ellie Kemper as a regular cast member, and the first Office episode since Ed Helms achieved box office success with the summer comedy film, The Hangover. "Gossip" received generally positive reviews, with several commentators particularly praising the subplot in which Andy questions whether the rumor about him being gay might actually be true. According to Nielsen ratings, the episode was watched by 8.21 million viewers. Although The Office had the highest 9 p.m. rating among viewers aged between 18 and 49, the overall episode constituted an 18 percent drop in viewership compared to the fifth-season premiere, "Weight Loss". "Gossip" was nominated for a Writers Guild of America Award for best episodic comedy.

== Synopsis ==
As the three summer interns prepare to depart, Michael Scott hears from various members of the office that two of the interns might be dating, and feels upset that he was left out of the gossip. He talks about the situation with the third intern, and learns that the interns had recently gone out to a young people's club, where they saw Stanley Hudson dancing with a woman, presumably his wife Teri.

Michael, wanting to start some gossip of his own, forms the conclusion that Stanley was out because he was having a mid-life crisis and shares it with the office, but Phyllis Vance claims Stanley does not like crowds and that Teri is out of town. When Michael confronts the interns about this, they insist they saw Stanley there "making out" with a woman. Now realizing that Stanley is possibly having an affair and he is the first person to learn of it, Michael starts telling the employees. Jim Halpert urges Michael to stop spreading a rumor that he does not know for certain to be true. When Stanley is leaving, Michael heads to the parking lot to discuss the rumor with him. Stanley initially denies it, but when Michael mentions that he was spotted in the club by the interns, he reveals that since Teri has been out of town constantly, he has been seeking company from a nurse named Cynthia, whom he met in rehab. Stanley urges Michael not to say anything since he is breaking it off with Cynthia, and Michael agrees, despite having already told the entire office.

Hoping to obscure the truth about Stanley's affair, Michael starts spreading a variety of false rumors, among them that there is another person physically inside Kevin Malone, that Kelly is anorexic, that Creed Bratton has asthma, that Toby Flenderson is still a virgin (despite him having a daughter), that Pam Beesly is pregnant (unaware it is true), and that Andy is gay. When Andy hears about this, he realizes that many people have thought this about him in the past and gets increasingly insecure as he begins to question his sexual orientation. Jim and Pam, who were trying to keep Pam's pregnancy a secret, think they have been found out. The couple then notice that there have been various absurd rumors about office employees being spread. When Jim brings it to everyone's attention, they trace one particular rumor back to Michael, who then tries to slip out of the office.

The employees pursue Michael, and he confesses that he created the rumors to conceal the one true rumor. Andy fears that it might be the one about him. The employees urge Michael to tell them which one is true, but just as Michael is about to give in, Jim announces that Pam is actually pregnant to save Stanley. Michael denies it, but Pam shows her baby's ultrasound picture to prove it.

Later, while Michael discusses her pregnancy with Jim and Pam in his office, Stanley's wife Teri returns Michael's call from earlier. He picks up the phone with the intention of making an excuse for his earlier call so as to not tip her off, but he accidentally calls her Cynthia twice before Jim hangs up the phone for him. Teri had already been suspicious of Stanley and Cynthia, so Michael calling her Cynthia is enough for her to figure out what is going on. Michael, feeling guilty, watches from his office window as Stanley attacks Michael's car with a tire iron in a fit of rage.

== Production ==
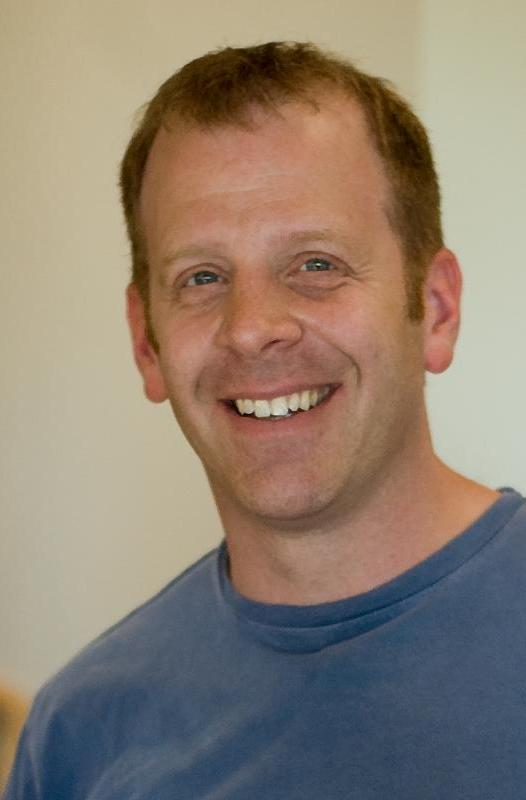
The Office actor and producer Paul Lieberstein wrote "Gossip".

"Gossip" was written and directed by Paul Lieberstein, a producer and screenwriter for the series who also plays Toby. The episode confirmed the fact that Pam was pregnant, which was strongly hinted in the fifth season finale, "Company Picnic". "Gossip" was the first episode to feature Ellie Kemper as a full cast member; she had guest starred in several episodes at the end of the fifth season as receptionist Erin Hannon. It was also the first episode of The Office to air since the release of the Ed Helms comedy film The Hangover. The film was a surprise box office success, grossing more than twice the amount of The 40-Year Old Virgin, which established Steve Carell as a comedy movie star. Commentators were split on what the success would mean for The Office, with some believing it would allow the show's writers to better realize his potential and write better material for Helms, and others expressing concern Helms would not be as dedicated to the Andy Bernard role.

The official website for The Office included three cut scenes from "Gossip" within a week of its original release. In the first 40-second clip, Dwight has the interns pass hand-written notes to officemates, while Ryan orders them to search thousands of pennies for rare coins. In the second clip, which is one minute and 10 seconds, Dwight has the interns pick up their own cake, but chastises them for not picking up candles. In the final two-minute clip, Dwight makes the interns memorize trivial bits of information, then tells them what he believes are inspirational stories.

== Cultural references ==
During the episode's cold open, Michael, Dwight, and Andy run throughout the office climbing on desks, jumping off chairs and pushing themselves off objects. The actions are their attempts to engage in parkour, the art of moving from point A to point B as creatively as possible, which Jim describes as "the Internet sensation of 2004". Jim points out parkour was used in a chase scene in the 2006 James Bond movie Casino Royale.

Pam says the Dunder Mifflin office previously did not have interns for years because Michael kept making jokes about Monica Lewinsky, an intern at the White House who had a sexual relationship with President Bill Clinton in 1995 and 1996. Michael discusses the 1960 movie Spartacus, which he calls a great "whodunit" due to the ending, in which dozens of people claim to be the real Spartacus in order to protect the actual title character.

While trying to figure out whether he is gay, Andy says he would reluctantly accept a kiss from movie star Brad Pitt. The three summer interns say Michael constantly says they look like actors Jet Li, Julia Stiles and Alan Thicke. Michael spreads a rumor that Oscar is the voice of the Taco Bell dog, a chihuahua used as an advertising character in the 1990s and 2000s for the restaurant chain Taco Bell. Michael also claims Angela is dating a billionaire who manages a Quiznos, a fast-food submarine sandwich restaurant. Michael starts a rumor that someone in the office is a J.Crew model, originally referring to himself, although everyone believes it to be Jim. J.Crew is an American clothing and accessories retailer.

== Reception ==
In its original American broadcast on September 17, 2009, "Gossip" was seen by 8.21 million viewers, according to Nielsen ratings. The viewership was an 18 percent drop compared to the fifth-season premiere, "Weight Loss". "Gossip" received a 4.0 rating among viewers aged between 18 and 49. It was the highest rating of that age group in the 9 p.m. to 10 p.m. slot, competing with CBS' CSI: Crime Scene Investigation, Fox's Fringe, ABC's Grey's Anatomy (a rerun) and The CW's Supernatural. However, the rating was a drop compared to a 4.9 rating among ages 18 to 49 for "Weight Loss". "Gossip" served as the lead-in for the series premiere of NBC's Community, which held on to 93 percent of The Office's 18 to 49 audience to premiere with a 3.7 rating, garnering 7.68 million viewers. The episode was viewed by 931,000 households during its Canadian premiere on September 17, 2009, making it the 28th highest viewed program of that week.

Some of the very best episodes of The Office play out like slow, agonizing and very entertaining train wrecks, with Michael Scott as the conductor obliviously leading his employees on a crash course towards embarrassment, humiliation and awkwardness. "Gossip" is definitely one of those episodes.

— Dan Phillips, IGN

"Gossip" received generally positive reviews. Several commentators particularly praised the comedic performance of Ed Helms, as well as the line by Kevin, "Who's been saying that there's another person inside of me working me with controls?" Alan Sepinwall of The Star-Ledger called the episode "not an instant classic, but a solid start to the season". Sepinwall said it started slowly, but gradually built to a "very funny, and kinda sweet climax in the conference room". New York magazine writer Will Leitch said "Gossip" appeared to be a return to a more normal Office atmosphere, compared to the surprises and twists of the fifth season. Rick Ingebritson of The Palm Beach Post said he was concerned the season premiere would not be good because Steve Carell, John Krasinski and Ed Helms would be too distracted with their growing film careers. But, he said, "Thankfully, if Thursday's premiere was any indication, it appears that the Dunder Mifflin crew still has a lot to offer." Entertainment Weekly writer Margaret Lyons said, "'Gossip' had some terrific moments, but I don't know that I'd put it on my all-time great episodes list." She specifically praised the performances of Brian Baumgartner and Jenna Fischer.

Chicago Tribune television columnist Maureen Ryan called "Gossip" a "solidly entertaining premiere", specifically complimenting the Ed Helms subplot and the various office rumors. Hopper of Best Week Ever praised the episode's final scene, in which Michael unsuccessfully tries to lie his way through a phone call with Stanley's wife. Dan Hopper said of the episode, "Season six is off to an appropriately awkward start." Philadelphia Examiner writer Matt Carter gave the episode an 8.9 out of 10 score. Carter said the episode was "proof that there is still a ton of life left in these characters", and particularly enjoyed the way Jim and Pam stood up for Stanley by revealing the truth about Pam's pregnancy. Dan Phillips of IGN said the episode included several "amusing asides and laugh-out-loud moments", particularly from supporting characters Creed, Kevin and Andy. He also praises the episode's "day in the life" formula, which he said has been successful in other previous Office episodes. Tara Tanzos of The Express-Times said the episode lived up to the series' standards, particularly praising the Ed Helms subplot and the parkour cold open.

For his work on this episode, Paul Lieberstein was nominated for a Writers Guild of America Award for Best Screenplay – Episodic Comedy, but lost to the pilot episode of Modern Family and the 30 Rock episode "Apollo, Apollo", which split the prize.
