= Jennifer Celotta =

American television producer and writer

- Born: Jennifer Ann Celotta; November 11, 1971 (age 54); Gaithersburg, Maryland, U.S.
- Occupations: Television writer, producer, director
- Years active: 1996–present
- Notable work: The Office; Home Improvement; Malcolm in the Middle; The Newsroom; Cobra Kai

Jennifer Ann Celotta (born November 11, 1971) is an American television producer, writer, and director. Among her credits are The Office, Cobra Kai, Abbott Elementary, Malcolm in the Middle, The Newsroom, Greg the Bunny, Andy Richter Controls the Universe and Home Improvement. She has directed three episodes of The Office: "Crime Aid", "The Promotion" and "Promos". By the fifth season, Celotta was serving as an Office executive producer and one of the series showrunners, along with fellow writer Paul Lieberstein. Celotta and Lieberstein wrote the fifth season finale "Company Picnic", which ended with character Pam Beesly learning she is pregnant.

Celotta and her co-writers on The Office received Emmy Award nominations for Outstanding Comedy Series in 2007, 2008, and 2009 but lost all three years to 30 Rock. The team also received Writers Guild of America Award nominations for Best Comedy Series each year since 2006. They won the award in 2007, but lost in 2006 to Curb Your Enthusiasm, and to 30 Rock in 2008 and 2009. Celotta and her The Office co-writers were also nominated for a WGA in 2006 for Best New Series, but lost to Grey's Anatomy.

After getting her start directing The Office, Celotta has directed episodes of Cobra Kai, People of Earth, and Trial & Error.

Celotta won a WGA Award in the category "Comedy/Variety – Music, Awards, Tributes – Specials" in 2009 for co-writing the 2008 Independent Spirit Awards ceremony. She shared the award with fellow co-writers Billy Kimball, Aaron Lee and The Office co-star Rainn Wilson.

She graduated from Wootton High School in Rockville, Maryland in 1989, and from Boston University in 1993.

== Filmography ==
| Year | Title | Credited as | | | Notes |
| Year | Title | Writer | Producer | Director | Notes |
|---|---|---|---|---|---|
| 1996–1999 | Home Improvement | Yes | No | No | 9 episodes, also story editor |
| 1999–2000 | Two Guys and a Girl | Yes | No | No | 2 episodes, also executive story editor |
| 2001–2002 | The Trouble with Normal | Yes | Yes | No | Co-producer, wrote 2 episodes |
| 2002–2003 | Andy Richter Controls the Universe | Yes | Yes | No | Wrote 2 episodes, also supervising producer |
| 2002–2004 | Greg the Bunny | Yes | Yes | No | Co-producer, wrote "Piddler on the Roof" |
| 2003–2004 | Happy Family | Yes | Yes | No | Supervising producer, wrote 3 episodes |
| 2004–2005 | Malcolm in the Middle | Yes | Yes | No | Wrote "Living Will"; Supervising and co-executive producer |
| 2005–2013 | The Office | Yes | Executive | Yes | Wrote 11 episodes, directed 3 episodes Also consulting and co-executive producer |
| 2014 | The Newsroom | No | Yes | No | Consulting producer |
| 2017 | Trial & Error | No | No | Yes | "Chapter 4: An Unwelcome Distraction" |
| 2017 | People of Earth | No | No | Yes | 2 episodes |
| 2018–2024 | Cobra Kai | No | No | Yes | 8 episodes |
| 2020 | Space Force | No | Yes | No | Consulting producer |
| 2022–2026 | Abbott Elementary | No | No | Yes | 5 episodes |
| 2025 | The Paper | No | No | Yes | Episode: "I Love You" |
