= Andy Buckley =

American actor

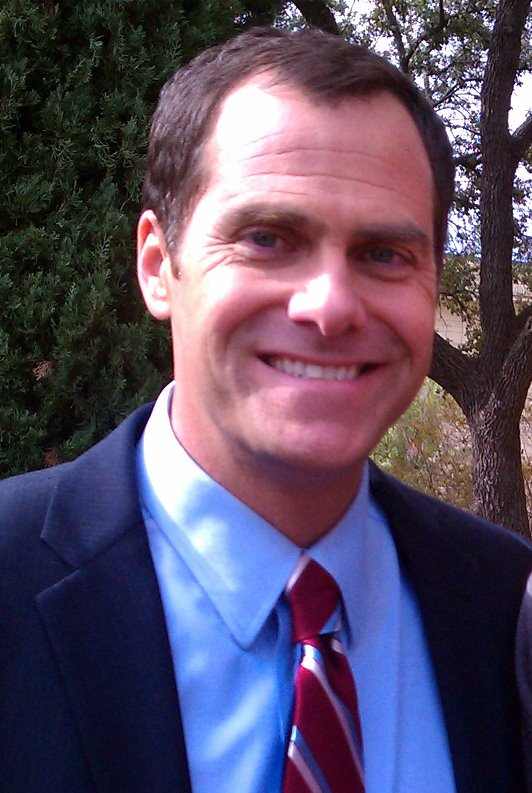
- Buckley in 2011
- Born: 1966 or 1967 (age 59–60); Salem, Massachusetts, U.S.
- Education: Stanford University
- Occupation: Actor
- Years active: 1992–present

Andy Buckley (born 1966 or 1967) is an American actor, best known for his role as David Wallace on the NBC comedy series The Office from 2006 to 2013.

== Early life ==
Buckley was born in Salem, Massachusetts. He attended the Pine Crest School in Florida before entering Stanford University, where he played on the golf team and graduated in 1987 with a bachelor's degree in political science. He later studied sketch comedy and improvisation at the Groundlings Theatre, working with comedians Melissa McCarthy and Dax Shepard. Prior to breaking through on The Office he worked as a financial advisor at Merrill Lynch for five years and he continued working there for another six years after being cast on the show.

== Career ==
=== Early work ===
Buckley appeared in two 1997 music videos, "I'd Rather Ride Around with You" and "What if it's You", by country music artist Reba McEntire.

=== The Office ===
Buckley played David Wallace, embattled CFO and later CEO of the fictional Dunder Mifflin Paper Company, in 37 episodes of The Office from 2006 to 2013. At the time of his initial appearance, he had been working as a financial advisor at Merrill Lynch, and had been cast specifically because of his familiarity with the world of corporate finance. He continued to work in the finance industry full-time during his recurring role on The Office. In October 2025, Buckley appeared alongside his The Office co-star Brian Baumgartner in a viral stunt and advertisement for the financial technology company Ramp.

=== Other work ===
In addition to The Office, Buckley has appeared in television series such as The League, CSI: Miami, NYPD Blue, The West Wing, and Veep. In 2010, his bit in the film The Other Guys climaxed with a fall from an eighth-floor ledge. That year, he had another supporting role in the film Life as We Know It with Katherine Heigl and Josh Duhamel.

As of 2011, Buckley was cast as Captain Correlli in the children's film Alvin and the Chipmunks: Chipwrecked. He played Rose Byrne's husband in the 2011 hit movie Bridesmaids, though his part was mostly cut out. He was cast as Ted Mercer, a happily married adoptive parent and plastic surgeon, in ABC Family's The Lying Game. In 2015, he appeared in a supporting role in the science fiction adventure film Jurassic World. In 2017, Buckley joined the cast of writer/director Chris Blake's indie horror film, All Light Will End, alongside Sarah Butler, John Schuck, and Sam Jones III.

In 2018, Buckley appeared with golfer Phil Mickelson in a commercial for Workday, Inc with Mickelson acting as his "Business Caddy" for important business decisions.

In 2020, Variety announced Buckley was joining the cast of the Chris Blake quarantine comedy, Distancing Socially. It would mark Buckley's second on-screen collaboration with the director. The film was shot at the height of the COVID-19 pandemic in 2020, using remote technologies and the iPhone 11. The film was acquired and released by Cinedigm in October 2021.

== Filmography ==
=== Film ===
Year	Title	Role	Notes
1992	Body Waves	Buckley	
1997	No Small Ways	Lyle	
1998	Running Woman	Reporter #2	
1999	The Big Day	Eddie	Also co-writer
2002	Grand Champion	Frank Bloomer	
2005	Blood Trail	Andrew P. Buckley	Direct to video
2009	ExTerminators	Steven Cantor	
2010	The Other Guys	Don Beaman	
2010	Life as We Know It	George Dunn	
2011	Bridesmaids	Perry Harris	
2011	Alvin and the Chipmunks: Chipwrecked	Captain Correlli	
2013	The Heat	Robin	
2014	Ask Me Anything	Mark Aubichon	
2014	Horrible Bosses 2	Surveillance Audio Agent	
2015	Jurassic World	Scott Mitchell	
2015	Brand New-U	Friend Two	
2015	Burning Bodhi	Buck	
2016	Tracktown	Burt	
2017	The House	Craig	
2017	Lady Bird	Matt	
2018	All Light Will End	David	
2018	The After Party	Mr. Levine	
2018	A Million Little Pieces	Dr. Stevens	
2019	Bombshell	Gerson Zweifach	
2020	Most Guys Are Losers	Mark Berzins	
2021	Distancing Socially	Andy	
2022	Tankhouse	Bob	

=== Television ===
Year	Title	Role	Notes
1990	China Beach	Chaplain	Episode: "Juice"
1991	A Woman Named Jackie	John Fitzgerald Kennedy Jr.	Television miniseries
1992	Sinatra	Actor Playing Prew	Television miniseries
1993	Silk Stalkings	Patrick Rose	Episode: "Soul Kiss"
1996	Caroline in the City	Rob Rothman	Episode: "Caroline and the Gift"
1996	The Crew	Justin	Episode: "The Man We Love"
1996	The Single Guy	Tom Conklin	Episode: "Mounted Cop"
1997	Melrose Place	Tony	Episode: "Screams from a Marriage"
1997–1998	Pacific Blue	Teddy Callaway	3 episodes
1998	Forever Love	Jerry	Television film
2000	Jack & Jill	Wayne	Episode: "When You Wish Upon a Car"
2000	The West Wing	Mike Satchel	Episode: "Let Bartlet Be Bartlet"
2000	CSI: Crime Scene Investigation	Jason Hendler	Episode: "Who Are You?"
2001	The District	Rupert Grimes	Episode: "Vigilante"
2001	First Years	Jack Mitchel	Episode: "The First Thing You Do..."
2002	NYPD Blue	Mike	Episode: "Jealous Hearts"
2003	Big Shot: Confessions of a Campus Bookie	FBI Agent Simms	Television film
2005	CSI: Crime Scene Investigation	Reporter #1	Episode: "King Baby"
2006–2013	The Office	David Wallace	Recurring Role; 38 episodes
2009	CSI: Miami	Gary Archer	Episode: "In Plane Sight"
2011–2013	The Lying Game	Dr. Ted Mercer	Main role
2012	Veep	Ted Cullen	3 episodes
2013	Arrested Development	Colonel Grimm	Episode: "Off the Hook"
2013	Baby Daddy	Professor Roger Shaw	Episode: "Test Anxiety"
2013	The League	Tony Thompson	Episode: "The Credit Card Alert"
2014	Silicon Valley	Carl Fleming	Episode: "Optimal Tip-To-Tip Efficiency"
2014	The Bridge	Doc Orton	Episode: "Eidolon"
2015–2017	Scorpion	Richard Elia	7 episodes
2015	Battle Creek	Steven	Episode: "Old Flames"
2015	American Dad!	Dr. Miller	Episode: "American Fung"
2015	Odd Mom Out	Andy Weber	Series regular
2015	You're the Worst	Russell Fleischer	2 episodes
2015–2016	Casual	Paul Schmidt	6 episodes
2016	It's Always Sunny in Philadelphia	Andy	Episode: "Chardee MacDennis 2: Electric Boogaloo"
2016	Hit the Floor	Andy	5 episodes
2017	Young and Hungry	Matt Danon	Recurring (Season 5)
2017	Curb Your Enthusiasm	FBI Agent	Episode: "Foisted!"
2018	Will & Grace	Hank	Episode: "Staten Island Fairy"
2018	9-1-1	Kenny	Episode: "A Whole New You"
2018–2019	Shameless	Randy	5 episodes
2020	Avenue 5	Frank Kelly	Recurring role, 9 episodes
2020	The Fugitive	Principal Spitaro	Main role, 5 episodes
2020	Dirty John	Robert Munro	2 episodes
2023	FUBAR	Donnie	Main cast

=== Web ===
Year	Title	Role	Notes
2016	Electra Woman and Dyna Girl	Agent Dan Dixon	
2022	Who Pressed Mute on Uncle Marcus?	Uncle Marcus	
