= Garage Sale (The Office) =

- The Office episode
- Michael Scott and Holly Flax kiss under the rain of sprinklers set off by candles that surround them.
- Episode no.: Season 7 Episode 19
- Directed by: Steve Carell
- Written by: Jon Vitti
- Cinematography by: Matt Sohn
- Editing by: David Rogers
- Production code: 7019
- Original air date: March 24, 2011

Guest appearance
- Hugh Dane as Hank Tate

Episode chronology
← Previous "Todd Packer"	Next → "Training Day"
- The Office (American season 7)

"Garage Sale" is the nineteenth episode of the seventh season of the American comedy television series The Office and the show's 145th episode overall. It originally aired on NBC in the United States on March 24, 2011. The episode was written by Jon Vitti and directed by series cast member, Steve Carell. The episode marks Carell's third director's credit for the series and the final physical appearance of Amy Ryan, who appeared as a regular since "Classy Christmas". (She makes a voice-only appearance in the episode "Goodbye, Michael".)

In the episode, Michael Scott (Steve Carell) decides to propose to Holly Flax (Amy Ryan), and runs into trouble thinking of how to do it well with his expensive diamond ring, so Pam Halpert consults several coworkers to steer him away from dangerous ideas. Meanwhile, Dunder Mifflin Scranton's warehouse and crew hosts a public garage sale.

"Garage Sale" was met with critical acclaim. Furthermore, HitFix reviewer Alan Sepinwall wrote that the episode could have served as Carell's last episode. It is considered one of the best episodes of The Office. According to Nielsen Media Research, the episode was viewed by more than 7 million viewers and received a 3.4 rating/10% share among adults between the ages of 18 and 49 which marked a slight rise in the ratings from the previous episode, "Todd Packer".

== Plot ==
Michael Scott decides to propose to Holly Flax, and having procured an expensive diamond ring (which cost what he believes is the traditional three years' salary), pours gasoline in the parking lot in the shape of letters, planning to light them on fire and show it to Holly. Pam Halpert stops it and gathers a meeting of Michael, herself, Jim Halpert, Ryan Howard, and Oscar Martinez. They believe Holly is "the one" for him and give him anecdotes and ideas. He calls Holly's father to ask his permission, and leaves a message when he does not answer. Holly catches onto the idea when she calls her parents herself, but she notices her parents seem mentally disoriented. She talks to Michael and says she wants to move back to Colorado to be there for her dad, and Michael supports her decision. Holly seems to be gearing up for a proposal, but Michael abruptly leaves, not wanting to be proposed to in such a casual way.

Dunder Mifflin Scranton's warehouse and crew host a public garage sale. Dwight Schrute attempts to walk away with the most expensive item by beginning with a thumbtack and trading up with his office mates. Jim claims he bought a packet of "miracle legumes" from a mysterious man in Jamaica. Dwight initially believes Jim is trying to prank him, but is astonished when they reappear after Jim seemingly destroyed the packet. He trades Jim a $150 telescope for the legumes. Dwight plants and waters the seeds and Jim secretly replaces the pots with full-grown plants.

Andy Bernard, Darryl Philbin, and Kevin Malone play and bet on the Dallas board game, which Kevin had for sale. As the instruction booklet is not with the game, Andy and Darryl make up the rules as they go along; when Kevin objects, Andy simply claims "that's Dallas." Eventually, Kevin notices the money they had bet on the game is missing, and storms out. As Darryl and Andy look at each other in confusion, Kevin reveals to the cameras that he has the money, stating, "And that... is Dallas", mocking Andy's statement.

Michael takes Holly on a walk through the office, pointing out the locations of various events throughout their courtship. He opens the door to the kitchen, revealing all of the other employees holding candles. Various members of the office ask Holly if she will marry them and she politely declines each one. Michael then leads Holly out to her desk, which is surrounded by dozens of candles. Michael gets down on his knee and begins to make a speech when the fire sprinklers go off due to the burning candles. The water drenches everyone in the office and Michael proposes. Holly accepts. Everyone then begins to congratulate Michael. However, Michael announces he is moving to Colorado with Holly, leaving his employees in shock.

== Production ==
Coupled with the fact that it was the start of Steve's departure and it was my own, yeah, there wasn't a dry eye in the house — literally, from the water pouring down on us and from our emotions. But it was a beautiful night ... We did it in two takes, but it took the crew quite a bit to vacuum up all the water with these big power vacs and reset everything as we stood by in robes, shivering.

— Amy Ryan

This episode was written by consulting producer Jon Vitti, his second writing credit of the series since joining the staff at the beginning of the seventh season. It was directed by series star Steve Carell, the third episode he has directed for the series. The episode marked Amy Ryan's last physical appearance on the series, although she did speak in "Goodbye, Michael". Ryan later said in an interview with New York that "The script was so sweet anyway that it made us all have a good cry" especially adding the fact that it was her final appearance. She also expressed her confidence that the series could survive without Carell and that it was the right move for him to leave. Vitti later submitted the episode for an Emmy Award for Outstanding Writing for a Comedy Series, but it was not nominated.

The Season Seven DVD contains several deleted scenes from this episode, including scenes where Gabe handles Erin's job at reception while she is at the garage sale, Michael tries to hire a sky writer (presumably to propose to Holly), and Michael suggests he propose to Holly by throwing Paula Poundstone off a roof.

== Cultural references ==
"Garage Sale" features several callbacks to previous episodes. Kevin's skills at poker were previously shown in "Casino Night". Michael's St. Pauli Girl sign was previously shown in "Dinner Party". Michael mentions when Toby left for Costa Rica from "Night Out". Dwight's subplot is a reference to One red paperclip.

== Reception ==
=== Ratings ===
In its original American broadcast, "Garage Sale" was viewed by an estimated 7.07 million viewers and received a 3.4 rating/10% share among adults between the ages of 18 and 49. This means that it was seen by 3.4% of all 18- to 49-year-olds, and 10% of all 18- to 49-year-olds watching television at the time of the broadcast. This marked a slight rise in the ratings from the previous episode, "Todd Packer", which received series lows. The episode ranked second in its timeslot beating the Fox crime drama Bones, which was seen by 8.78 million households; and CBS coverage of NCAA basketball, which was seen by 6.82 million household; but it was defeated by the ABC medical drama Grey's Anatomy, which was seen by an average 10.1 million households.

=== Reviews ===
This episode received critical acclaim and is considered one of the best Office episodes. HitFix reviewer Alan Sepinwall called it one of his "favorite Office episodes ever" and also called it one of the greatest romantic sitcom episodes of all-time. He also said the episode could have served as Carell's last episode, and praised "Garage Sale" for its multiple subplots, its exploration of the ensemble cast, and Jim's prank against Dwight. Sepinwall named it one of the best TV episodes of 2011 for series that were not great the whole year and praised it for showcasing "the ridiculous and romantic sides of The Office". He also wrote that it gave Fischer and Krasinski their best material for the series in years. Cindy White of IGN praised it for its mix of comedy and drama. She also complimented it for the showcase of the cast, ultimately giving the episode a 9/10. James Poniewozik of Time said it "was unspectacular as an episode overall but did build to a delightful moment as Michael finally proposed to Holly", later naming it one of his honorable mentions for the top 10 TV episodes of 2011.

The A.V. Club writer Myles McNutt called the episode a "spiritual successor to 'Casino Night', which remains one of my all-time favorite episodes of the series" for "turning what could feel like a gimmicky sitcom scenario into something that feels distinct to both the office [the characters] ... and The Office". He ultimately gave the episode an A−. Kevin Fallon of The Atlantic compared the proposal to other television proposals on Friends, Cheers and Frasier. New York writer Willer Paskin praised the writers for being adept at writing for romance. Following the airing of the episode, Colorado governor John Hickenlooper issued a press release appointing Michael Scott to the position of Director of Paper Distribution in the Department of Natural Resources. "Garage Sale" was voted the third-highest-rated out of 24 from the seventh season, according to a "Survivor" episode poll at the fansite OfficeTally. It was later named the 20th-best episode of the series according to an episode poll by OfficeTally. BuddyTV named the episode the 19th-best TV episode of 2011 and it was the only episode of the series to make the list.
