= The Office (American TV series) season 7 =

The Office
- Season 7
- DVD cover
- Showrunner: Paul Lieberstein
- Starring: Steve Carell; Rainn Wilson; John Krasinski; Jenna Fischer; B. J. Novak; Ed Helms; Leslie David Baker; Brian Baumgartner; Creed Bratton; Kate Flannery; Mindy Kaling; Ellie Kemper; Angela Kinsey; Paul Lieberstein; Oscar Nunez; Craig Robinson; Phyllis Smith; Zach Woods; Amy Ryan
- No. of episodes: 26

Release
- Original network: NBC
- Original release: September 23, 2010 – May 19, 2011

Season chronology
- ← Previous; Season 6 Next → Season 8

The seventh season of the American television comedy The Office premiered on September 23, 2010 and concluded on May 19, 2011 on NBC. The season consisted of 26 half-hours of material, divided into 22 half-hour episodes and two hour-long episodes. The seventh season aired on Thursdays at 9:00 p.m. (ET) as part of Comedy Night Done Right. It stars Steve Carell, Rainn Wilson, John Krasinski, Jenna Fischer, B. J. Novak, and Ed Helms, with supporting performances from Leslie David Baker, Brian Baumgartner, Creed Bratton, Kate Flannery, Mindy Kaling, Ellie Kemper, Angela Kinsey, Paul Lieberstein, Oscar Nunez, Craig Robinson, Phyllis Smith, Zach Woods, and Amy Ryan. This was the last season to feature Michael Scott, played by Carell, as the lead character. The seventh season was released on DVD and Blu-ray in region 1 on September 6, 2011.

== Production ==
The seventh season of the show is produced by Reveille Productions and Deedle-Dee Productions, both in association with Universal Media Studios. The show is based upon the British series created by Ricky Gervais and Stephen Merchant, both of whom are executive producers on both the U.S. and UK versions. The Office is produced by Greg Daniels, who is also an executive producer. Returning writers from the previous season include Mindy Kaling, B. J. Novak, Paul Lieberstein, Brent Forrester, Justin Spitzer, Aaron Shure, Charlie Grandy, Daniel Chun, Warren Lieberstein, and Halsted Sullivan. New writers in the seventh season include Peter Ocko, Jon Vitti, Steve Hely, Carrie Kemper (sister of Ellie Kemper), Robert Padnick, and Amelie Gillette. Paul Lieberstein serves as executive producer and showrunner, and Novak was promoted from co-executive producer to executive producer midseason. Kaling, Shure, Chun and Ocko are co-executive producers; Forrester and Vitti are consulting producers; Spitzer and Grandy are supervising producers; and Warren Lieberstein, Halsted Sullivan and Steve Hely are producers.

The Office was filmed on a studio set at Valley Center Studios in Van Nuys, California. Only establishing shots for the opening theme of the city of Scranton, Pennsylvania, where the show is set, were made on location there.

== Plot ==
Notable plots and subplots that affect the seventh season and beyond include:

- Dwight's purchase of the Scranton Business Park, where Dunder Mifflin is situated
- Erin's new relationship with Gabe
- Pam quitting sales and becoming the office administrator
- Angela beginning a relationship with State Senator Robert Lipton, whom Oscar believes is a closeted homosexual
- Holly's return to Scranton and Michael's lingering romantic feelings for her
- Michael's move to Colorado after getting engaged to Holly
- The brief regional manager tenures of DeAngelo Vickers and Dwight
- The search for a new permanent regional manager, which includes Andy, Darryl, Robert California, Nellie Bertram and David Brent.

== Cast ==
Many characters portrayed by The Office cast are based on the British version of the show. While these characters usually have the same attitude and perceptions as their British counterparts, the roles have been redesigned to fit the American show better. The show is known for its generally large cast size, with many actors and actresses known particularly for their improvisational work.

=== Main ===
- Steve Carell as Michael Scott, Regional Manager of the Dunder Mifflin Scranton Branch. Michael leaves the show near the end of the season to move to Colorado with his fiancée, Holly Flax.
- Rainn Wilson as Dwight Schrute, the office's top-performing sales representative.
- John Krasinski as Jim Halpert, a sales representative, former office co-manager, and prankster, married to Pam Beesly.
- Jenna Fischer as Pam Halpert, former receptionist. She begins the season as an unsuccessful salesperson before creating the position of administrative supervisor for herself.
- B. J. Novak as Ryan Howard, former Vice President of Dunder Mifflin, now in the same temp position he held in Season 1.
- Ed Helms as Andy Bernard, a preppy salesman with a poor sales record. In this season, he is jealous of ex-girlfriend Erin's relationship with Gabe Lewis.

=== Starring ===
- Leslie David Baker as Stanley Hudson, a grumpy salesman.
- Brian Baumgartner as Kevin Malone, a dim-witted accountant, who is based on Keith Bishop.
- Creed Bratton as Creed Bratton, the office's strange quality assurance officer.
- Kate Flannery as Meredith Palmer, the promiscuous supplier relations representative.
- Mindy Kaling as Kelly Kapoor, the pop-culture obsessed customer service representative.
- Ellie Kemper as Erin Hannon, the receptionist and love interest of Andy.
- Angela Kinsey as Angela Martin, a judgemental accountant.
- Paul Lieberstein as Toby Flenderson, the sad-eyed human resources representative.
- Oscar Nunez as Oscar Martinez, an intelligent accountant, who is also gay.
- Craig Robinson as Darryl Philbin, the warehouse manager.
- Phyllis Smith as Phyllis Vance, a motherly saleswoman.
- Zach Woods as Gabe Lewis, the director of Sabre sales.
- Amy Ryan as Holly Flax, a HR representative and Michael's love interest.

=== Special guest stars ===
- Kathy Bates as Jo Bennet, the CEO of Sabre Industries.
- Timothy Olyphant as Danny Cordray, an expert salesman.
- Will Ferrell as Deangelo Vickers, Michael's replacement as regional manager.

=== Recurring ===
- Hugh Dane as Hank Tate, the building's sardonic security guard.
- Bobby Ray Shafer as Bob Vance (Vance Refrigeration), Phyllis' husband
- Linda Purl as Helene Beesly, Pam's mother and Michael's ex-girlfriend.
- David Koechner as Todd Packer, a rude and offensive traveling salesman.
- Jack Coleman as Robert Lipton, a state senator and Angela's boyfriend.
- Cody Horn as Jordan Garfield, an assistant hired by Deangelo.

=== Notable guests ===
- Evan Peters as Luke Cooper, Michael's nephew, an incompetent nepotism hire.
- Melora Hardin as Jan Levinson, a former Dunder Mifflin employee and Michael's ex-girlfriend.
- Nancy Carell as Carol Stills, a real estate agent and Michael's ex-girlfriend.
- Amy Pietz as Donna Newton, a married woman whom Michael briefly dated.
- David Denman as Roy Anderson, a former warehouse worker and Pam's ex-fiancé.
- Rashida Jones as Karen Filippelli, Jim's ex-girlfriend and former Scranton employee, now regional manager of the Utica branch.
- James Spader as Robert California, an eccentric man who interviews for the regional manager position.
- Catherine Tate as Nellie Bertram, a British woman and a friend of Jo, who interviews for the regional manager position.
- Ricky Gervais as David Brent, a cocky British man who interviews for the regional manager position.
- Will Arnett as Fred Henry, an interviewee for the regional manager position.
- Ray Romano as Merv Bronte, an anxious interviewee for the regional manager position.
- Warren Buffett as an unnamed interviewee for the regional manager position.
- Jim Carrey as the Finger Lakes guy, an unnamed man who left his family on a vacation at the Finger Lakes in order to interview for the regional manager position.

=== Casting ===
On June 28, 2010, it was confirmed that the seventh season would be Steve Carell's last on the show, as his contract was expiring. NBC confirmed that the series would continue after his departure, and would welcome any return appearances by Carell. Actor and writer/co-executive producer B. J. Novak renewed his contract with Universal Media Studios through an eighth season and was promoted to full executive producer halfway through the seventh season. As of this season, Zach Woods, who plays Gabe Lewis on the show, has been promoted to a series regular. Executive producer/writer/actor Paul Lieberstein confirmed that Amy Ryan, who portrays Holly Flax, would appear in eight episodes of the season. He also confirmed Kathy Bates would return as Jo Bennett in the season premiere. Melora Hardin returns as Jan Levinson. Timothy Olyphant guest starred in two episodes as rival salesman, Danny Cordray, who previously went on two dates with Pam. Jack Coleman appears in a new recurring role as Senator Robert Lipton, who is dating Angela. Amy Ryan made her first return appearance as Holly in a voice-only role in "Sex Ed", and finally returned to Dunder Mifflin in the hour-long Christmas episode; and she was billed among the rest of the starring cast for the rest of the season.

The episode titled "Threat Level Midnight", which aired February 17, 2011, revolved around the screening of Michael's film where all the office employees portray the characters in the film. The episode featured Melora Hardin as Jan, and the return of Rashida Jones as Karen and David Denman as Roy. During NBC's TCA press tour, it was confirmed that Steve Carell would depart with three episodes left to go in the season, with the remaining episodes focusing on the search for (and selection of) his replacement as office manager. Executive producer Greg Daniels, who wrote Carell's farewell, stated the top candidates are Andy, Dwight, and Darryl, or possibly a newcomer. He also stated that whoever becomes the new manager would not become the main focus of the show like Michael was, and that two new regular cast members would join the cast during the eighth season. Ricky Gervais reprised his role as David Brent from the original British series in a cameo appearance in the episode "The Seminar" that aired January 27, 2011. Will Ferrell appeared in four episodes as Deangelo Vickers, Michael Scott's temporary replacement. Ferrell's character proved to be just as inept as Michael when it came to managing a business. Steve Carell finished filming his final scenes for the show on March 4, 2011. Ricky Gervais returned as David Brent in the season finale, along with Will Arnett who played a new character. Gervais also contributed to the script for the season finale. Ray Romano, James Spader, Catherine Tate, Warren Buffett and Jim Carrey also appeared in the season finale.

== Reception ==
=== Ratings ===
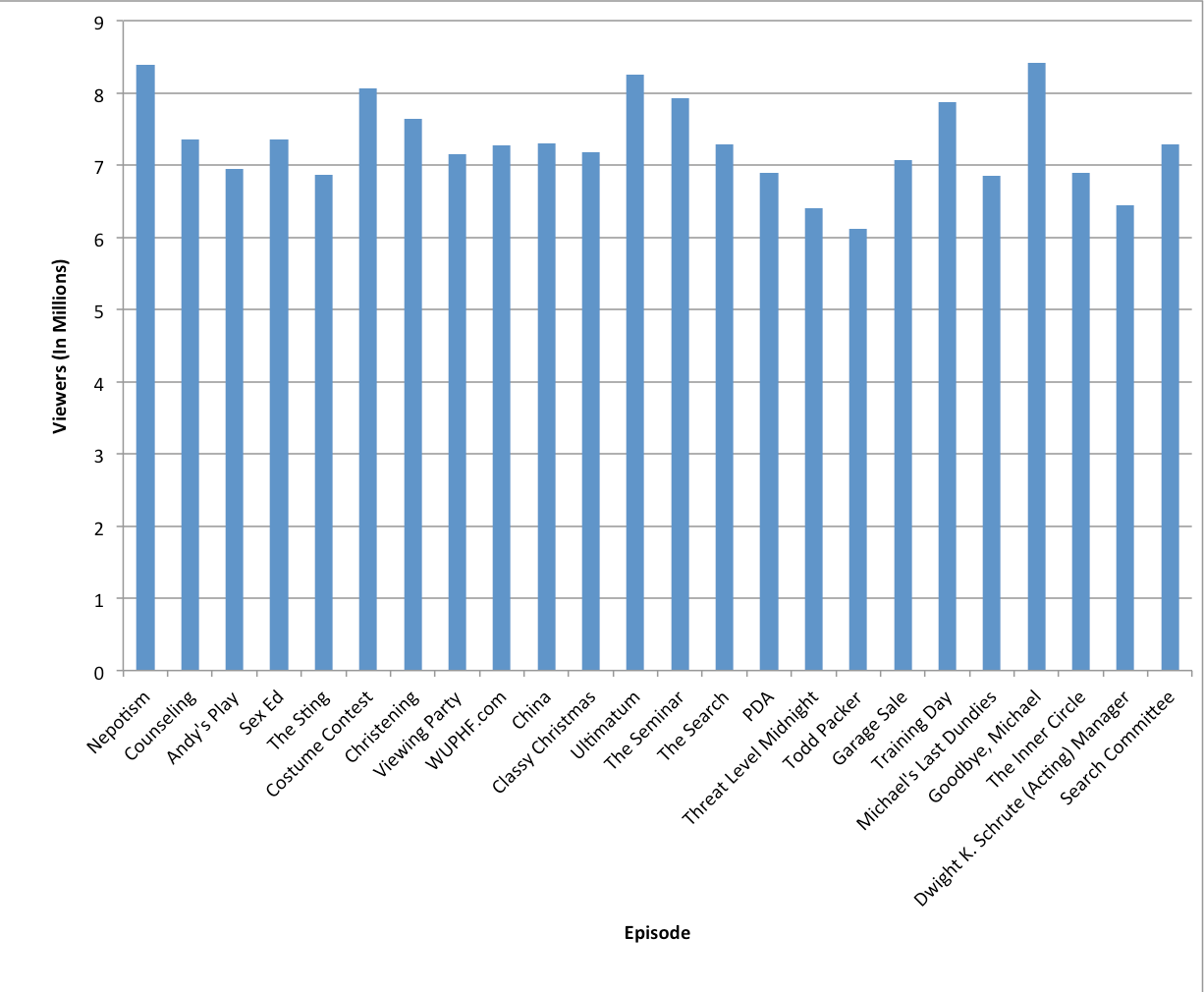
The ratings for season seven of The Office

The series aired on Thursdays at 9:00 p.m. as part of Comedy Night Done Right television block. The season premiere, "Nepotism" received a 4.4/11 percent share in the Nielsen ratings among viewers aged 18 to 49, meaning that 4.4 percent of viewers aged 18 to 49 watched the episode, and 11 percent of viewers watching television at the time watched the episode. It was viewed by 8.4 million viewers, marking a slight increase in viewers from the sixth season premiere "Gossip". The season hit a low with the 16th episode, "Todd Packer", which was viewed by only 6.12 million viewers. Conversely, the season's 22nd episode, "Goodbye, Michael", was the highest-rated episode of the season, being watched by 8.42 million viewers. The finale, "Search Committee" was viewed by 7.29 million viewers, a marked increase from the sixth-season finale "Whistleblower" which garnered only 6.6 million viewers.

For the 2010–2011 season, The Office ranked as the 53rd-most watched program, averaging a total of 7.731 million viewers. In the 18- to 49-year-old demographic, the show was the 11th-most watched television program of the broadcasting year.

=== Critical reception ===
This season received mostly positive reviews from television critics, with many claiming that it was an improvement over the sixth season. Cindy White of IGN gave the season an 8 out of 10, calling it "great." She felt that the departure of Steve Carell helped reinvigorate the series, as well to see the character of Michael evolve and mature over the course of the season naturally. She also noted that the show proved it could survive without Carell. She highlighted the episodes "Threat Level Midnight", "Garage Sale" and "Goodbye, Michael" as the best episodes of the season. Randy Miller III of DVD Talk felt that the majority of the season was "better than the sixth by a country mile" and that it was a "year that's still worth watching". He applauded the way the show was able to write-out Carell's character, noting that "Goodbye, Michael" combined "nostalgia, comedy and a little drama to get its point across". However, he was critical of several of the episodes that follow Carell's departure, and he called Ferrell's character a "full-blown psycho".

Phillip Maciak of Slant Magazine awarded the season three stars out of four, and felt that the season showcased the skills of the ensembles cast. He wrote that it "has made a convincing argument, not that Michael Scott can be replaced, but that he doesn't need to be." Myles McNutt of The A.V. Club commented that, while he felt that the season was uneven, it was a "distinct improvement over season six," claiming Carell's exit gave the show a "sense of focus that was absent last year." James Poniewozik of Time called the season "mixed at best" and that the best episodes of the season "played almost like a series of vignettes and set pieces that allowed the characters to just be." He ended with saying it was an improvement over the sixth season and that he generally enjoyed the season overall.

=== Awards ===
During the seventh season, The Office received two award nominations at the 2011 Writers Guild of America Awards. Aaron Shure was nominated in Episodic Comedy category for writing the episode, "WUPHF.com", and the series was nominated for Best Comedy Series. The series was also nominated for Outstanding Performance by an Ensemble in a Comedy Series for the 17th Screen Actors Guild Awards. Steve Carell was nominated for four comedic acting awards, at the 17th Screen Actors Guild Awards, 68th Golden Globe Awards, 37th People's Choice Awards and the 2010 Satellite Awards. At the 1st Critics' Choice Television Awards, the series was nominated for Best Comedy Series, while Steve Carell was nominated for Best Actor in a Comedy Series. For the 63rd Primetime Emmy Awards, the series received four nominations—for Outstanding Comedy series, Steve Carell for Outstanding Lead Actor in a Comedy Series, Greg Daniels for Outstanding Writing for a Comedy Series for "Goodbye, Michael", and for Outstanding Sound Mixing for a Comedy or Drama Series (Half-Hour) and Animation for "Andy's Play".

== Episodes ==
In the following table, "U.S. viewers (million)" refers to the number of Americans who viewed the episode on the night of broadcast. Episodes are listed by the order in which they aired, and may not necessarily correspond to their production codes.

No. overall	No. in season	Title	Directed by	Written by	Original release date	Prod. code	U.S. viewers (millions)
127	1	"Nepotism"	Jeffrey Blitz	Daniel Chun	September 23, 2010	7001	8.48
Michael upsets the office when he ignores their pleas to fire office assistant Luke, Michael's immature nephew. Pam's attempt to prank Dwight backfires when Kevin's faulty rewiring of an elevator strands the two together. Andy grows even more upset with Gabe and Erin's relationship. Michael spanks his nephew in front of the entire office which results in him having to take 6 counselling sessions with Toby.
128	2	"Counseling"	Jeffrey Blitz	B. J. Novak	September 30, 2010	7002	7.36
Michael is frustrated to find out that his six hours of counseling with Toby cannot be counted unless he talks. Toby attempts to use different methods to get Michael to open up but Michael refuses to make Toby's job easy. Pam attempts to finagle a promotion to office administrator. Dwight seeks revenge (in the Pretty Woman style) with the help of his colleagues, after a shop owner at the Steamtown Mall refuses to serve him.
129	3	"Andy's Play"	John Stuart Scott	Charlie Grandy	October 7, 2010	7003	6.95
Andy lands a role in a local production of Sweeney Todd and invites the entire office to the performance, hoping to impress Erin. However, she offers to babysit for Jim and Pam instead, hoping to get a start in the babysitter career. While Michael struggles to put his jealousy aside in regard to not being cast in the play, Jim and Pam have trouble with their less-than-stellar babysitter. Angela and Dwight continue to have a contract to uphold.
130	4	"Sex Ed"	Paul Lieberstein	Paul Lieberstein	October 14, 2010	7004	7.36
Michael comes to work thinking he has a pimple, but it turns out to actually be a cold sore. When he is told that it is a form of herpes, Michael contacts all his ex-girlfriends—Jan (Melora Hardin), Holly (Amy Ryan), Helene (Linda Purl), Donna (Amy Pietz), and Carol (Nancy Carell)—and during all that, he discovers that Holly thinks he over-romanticized their relationship. Andy holds a sex education meeting in the office hoping to appeal to Erin's passionate side. Michael concludes that he did not exaggerate his relationship with Holly and what they had was in fact something special.
131	5	"The Sting"	Randall Einhorn	Mindy Kaling	October 21, 2010	7005	6.87
When a Dunder Mifflin client is stolen by rival salesman Danny Cordray (Timothy Olyphant), Michael, Dwight and Jim decide to set up a sting in order to uncover his sales secret. Meredith, who pretends to be the manager of the fake company, tanks the plan due her attraction to Danny, resulting in Michael hiring him to appear victorious. Andy starts a band with Darryl when he learns that one of his old college friends has a successful music career.
132	6	"Costume Contest"	Dean Holland	Justin Spitzer	October 28, 2010	7006	8.07
Michael freaks out when Darryl goes over his head by taking an idea to corporate that Michael initially dismissed. The employees partake in a Halloween costume contest in the office for a coupon book prize, organized as Pam’s first task as the office administrator. Meanwhile, she tries to get the truth from Danny about their dating history.
133	7	"Christening"	Alex Hardcastle	Peter Ocko	November 4, 2010	7007	7.65
Pam and Jim's baby, Cece, gets christened and Michael invites the entire office to celebrate. Because of his feeling of being left, Michael joins a church group of high school graduates on a mission to Mexico, with Andy following along to impress Erin.
134	8	"Viewing Party"	Ken Whittingham	Jon Vitti	November 11, 2010	7008	7.15
In an attempt to make Michael get along with Gabe, Erin invites the office over to Gabe's house for a Glee viewing party. Michael can't handle the fact that the office workers think of Gabe as their boss instead of him and tries to sabotage the party. Growing more jealous of Gabe and Erin's relationship, Andy goes to extremes in order to impress her. Dwight helps Pam with Cece, much to Jim's chagrin.
135	9	"WUPHF.com"	Danny Leiner	Aaron Shure	November 18, 2010	7009	7.28
Michael helps Ryan by charming people to invest in his internet company, WUPHF.com. Dwight creates a hay festival in the parking lot for the Thanksgiving holiday. While waiting for Dwight, Angela meets the State Senator in the festival. Jim learns of a new Sabre capping policy that prevents him from earning too much commission.
136	10	"China"	Charles McDougall	Halsted Sullivan & Warren Lieberstein	December 2, 2010	7010	7.31
When Michael reads an article about China growing as a global power, he decides they must be stopped before they take over the United States. When Oscar contradicts him and is proven wrong, he is taunted by the entire office. Pam threatens to move Dunder Mifflin to a new building after everyone in the office complains about Dwight's building standards. Darryl is sick of Andy's annoying text messages. Dwight clandestinely helps Pam succeed as an Office Administrator.
137	11	"Classy Christmas"^{‡}	Rainn Wilson	Mindy Kaling	December 9, 2010	7011	7.18
138	12	"Classy Christmas"^{‡}	Rainn Wilson	Mindy Kaling	December 9, 2010	7012	7.18
Michael couldn't be happier when Toby takes a leave of absence, leaving corporate to send Holly Flax (Amy Ryan) to cover for him. Michael forces Pam to plan a second Christmas party on the day Holly returns to Scranton. Jim agrees to a snowball fight with Dwight, which he later regrets.
139	13	"Ultimatum"	David Rogers	Carrie Kemper	January 20, 2011	7013	8.26
Michael anticipates the news regarding the status of Holly and A.J.'s relationship. In the office, Pam puts up a New Year's resolution board so everyone can post their resolutions but things get chaotic. Darryl convinces Andy and Dwight to go with him to the bookstore in hopes of picking up women, when in fact he wants to work on his secret resolution of reading more.
140	14	"The Seminar"	B. J. Novak	Steve Hely	January 27, 2011	7014	7.93
Andy holds a small business seminar in the office with some special guests to earn some extra cash, after he finds out that his sales are the lowest. Michael and Holly use the seminar as an improv challenge, posing as a Greek couple. Erin and Gabe have a game of Scrabble to decide who will choose their movie of the day. Oscar and Pam help Erin out when she turns out to be a very bad Scrabble player.
141	15	"The Search"	Michael Spiller	Brent Forrester	February 3, 2011	7015	7.29
Jim gets an emergency phone call from Helene (Linda Purl), forcing him to leave Michael at a gas station bathroom. This leads Holly, Erin, and Dwight on a search for Michael's whereabouts. A captioning contest starts in the office over Pam's artwork, which seems to offend Gabe. Holly eventually finds Michael because of their similar mentality and she realizes her feelings for him.
142	16	"PDA"	Greg Daniels	Robert Padnick	February 10, 2011	7017	6.90
Michael and Holly's public displays of affection start to make everyone in the office uncomfortable. Jim and Pam have too much champagne during a Valentine's Day lunch, causing complications when they have to return to work. Andy tags along on a romantic treasure hunt Gabe has made for Erin.
143	17	"Threat Level Midnight"	Tucker Gates	B. J. Novak	February 17, 2011	7016	6.41
Michael screens his action film Threat Level Midnight to the office after ten years of writing, shooting, re-shooting, and editing. The film features Michael as Agent Michael Scarn, Dwight as Scarn's butler and sidekick, and Jim as archnemesis "Goldenface," as well as several people from Michael's past including Jan (Melora Hardin), Karen (Rashida Jones), Roy (David Denman), Helene (Linda Purl), Todd Packer (David Koechner), Tony Gardner (Mike Bruner), and Troy Underbridge (Noel Petok). Complications arise when Michael doesn’t get an expected response about the film from Holly.
144	18	"Todd Packer"	Randall Einhorn	Amelie Gillette	February 24, 2011	7018	6.12
Traveling salesman Todd Packer (David Koechner) comes to Dunder Mifflin looking for a desk job in the office. However, the office is unsure if they want him to work there due to his previous behavior. When Erin gets a new computer, Andy, who is also dealing with computer problems, confronts office administrator Pam to get him a new one too. Jim and Dwight team up to get rid of Packer. Michael who has previously idealized Packer, changes his mind about him when he insults Holly.
145	19	"Garage Sale"	Steve Carell	Jon Vitti	March 24, 2011	7019	7.07
Michael decides to propose to Holly with his expensive diamond ring, thinking about outrageous ideas to carry out the proposal. When Pam notices, she makes him consult Oscar, Ryan, Jim, and herself for advice, and their opinions on his ideas. Meanwhile, Dunder Mifflin Scranton's warehouse and crew hosts a public garage sale. Jim dupes Dwight by selling him “magic beans”. The episode ends with Michael and Holly getting engaged and announcing that they will be moving to Colorado.
146	20	"Training Day"	Paul Lieberstein	Daniel Chun	April 14, 2011	7020	7.87
Michael's replacement appears in the office, to start receiving training from Michael. The new manager, Deangelo Vickers (Will Ferrell), has everyone hoping to make good first impressions. Andy finds himself awkwardly type cast as the funny guy, while Jim and Pam worry that they've come on too strong. Only Dwight is apathetic about the new leader. Michael tries to deal with his jealousy, and establish himself as the boss.
147	21	"Michael's Last Dundies"	Mindy Kaling	Mindy Kaling	April 21, 2011	7021	6.85
Michael trains his office replacement, Deangelo (Will Ferrell), for hosting the Dundie Awards. Meanwhile, Erin deals with her dislike of her boyfriend, Gabe. Michael gets treated to a special song as a farewell present from the entire office.
148	22	"Goodbye, Michael"^{†}	Paul Feig	Greg Daniels	April 28, 2011	7022	8.42
Michael prepares to leave for Colorado with Holly, and spends his last day in the office saying goodbye to everyone individually, wanting no drama to ensue. Meanwhile, new manager Deangelo and Andy try to keep Michael's biggest clients.
149	23	"The Inner Circle"	Matt Sohn	Charlie Grandy	May 5, 2011	7023	6.90
New office manager Deangelo picks favorites among the staff, revealing his true management style.
150	24	"Dwight K. Schrute, (Acting) Manager"	Troy Miller	Justin Spitzer	May 12, 2011	7024	6.45
Dwight becomes the interim manager, instituting a typically heavy-handed management style. Meanwhile, Gabe tries to win back Erin.
151	25	"Search Committee"^{‡}	Jeffrey Blitz	Paul Lieberstein	May 19, 2011	7025	7.29
152	26	"Search Committee"^{‡}	Jeffrey Blitz	Paul Lieberstein	May 19, 2011	7026	7.29
Deangelo's new replacement is sought out through a search committee process led by Jim.

^† denotes a "super-sized" 40-minute episode (with advertisements; actual runtime around 28 minutes).
^‡ denotes an hour-long episode (with advertisements; actual runtime around 42 minutes).
