= Dwight K. Schrute, (Acting) Manager =

- The Office episode
- Episode no.: Season 7 Episode 24
- Directed by: Troy Miller
- Written by: Justin Spitzer
- Cinematography by: Matt Sohn
- Editing by: David Rogers
- Production code: 7024
- Original air date: May 12, 2011

Guest appearances
- Kathy Bates as Jo Bennett; Cody Horn as Jordan Garfield

Episode chronology
← Previous "The Inner Circle"	Next → "Search Committee"
- The Office (American season 7)

"Dwight K. Schrute, (Acting) Manager" is the twenty-fourth episode of the seventh season of the American comedy television series The Office and the show's 150th episode overall. The episode was written by Justin Spitzer and directed by Troy Miller. It originally aired in the United States on May 12, 2011 on NBC. The episode also features guest appearances from Kathy Bates, Cody Horn and Michael Schur.

The series depicts the everyday lives of office employees in the Scranton, Pennsylvania branch of the fictional Dunder Mifflin Paper Company. In the episode, Dwight (Rainn Wilson) becomes the interim regional manager, instituting a heavy-handed management style. Meanwhile, Gabe (Zach Woods) tries to win back Erin (Ellie Kemper), but Andy (Ed Helms) gets in his way.

The episode received positive reviews from critics, with many commenting that it proved the series could survive without the lead actor, Steve Carell. According to Nielsen Media Research, "Dwight K. Schrute, (Acting) Manager" drew an estimated 6.45 million viewers and earned a 3.3 rating/8% share among those aged 18–49, making it the second-lowest-rated episode of the season after "Todd Packer".

== Synopsis ==
With Deangelo Vickers in a coma on life support, Jo Bennett offers Jim Halpert the position of interim regional manager. He turns her down, as the office actually functions very smoothly without a manager; everyone shows up, works for the day with reasonable breaks, and are highly productive. Jo appoints Dwight Schrute interim regional manager instead. Dwight establishes a strict management style in stark contrast to their previously relaxed style, from making the employees recite the Pledge of Allegiance, setting up firewalls, creating long passwords to use the office's machines, and installing antique punch clocks. He also renovates his office with odd decorations, such as a marble desk and a piranha tank.

Jim is especially unhappy with the changes, and pranks Dwight by suggesting that he is leading an uprising called "The Fist". To impress Jo, Dwight buys a gun (the same kind Jo collects), though he is more excited when he receives a holster as a gift from a relative, and uses the gun to accessorize. Pam Halpert insists that he put it away, but Dwight accidentally fires the gun right by Andy Bernard, causing him temporary hearing loss. The office workers extort favors from Dwight in exchange for their silence, and Jim insists that Dwight do outlandish things (such as doing jazz hands) at certain promptings.

Gabe Lewis continues with his attempts to win back Erin Hannon. He invites Andy to the conference room to speak in private. Gabe tearfully breaks down, and Andy promises he will not date Erin again. Gabe confronts Andy with the promise after he sees the two hanging out together, but Andy stands up for himself and embarrasses Gabe by describing Gabe's crying fit to Erin. He says whether he wants to date Erin is his own business.

When Jo comes to visit the branch, Dwight admits to the gun incident. He attempts to divert the blame to his employees, saying that blackmail is a bigger crime than firing a gun accidentally, but Jo takes the position away from him. Jo instates Creed Bratton, who has the most seniority in the office, as acting manager until a committee composed of Jim, Toby Flenderson, and Gabe find a replacement. While Jim tells Dwight that Jo did the right thing, he also compliments Dwight, noting that the office got every single company order out on time, and Dwight slightly lights up.

== Production ==
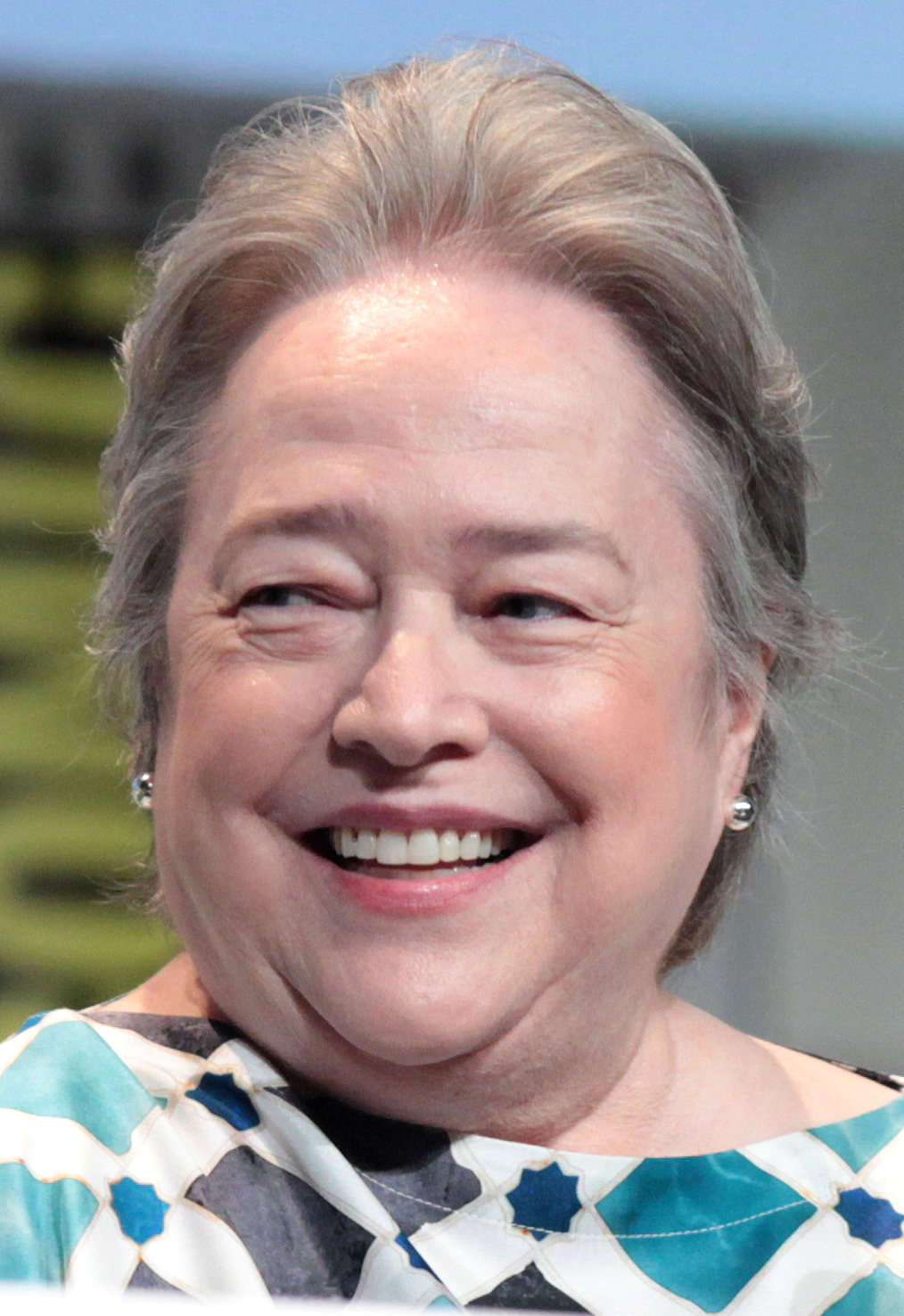
Kathy Bates reprised her role as Sabre CEO Jo Bennett.

"Dwight K. Schrute, (Acting) Manager" was the ninth episode of the series written by supervising producer Justin Spitzer, and the first directed by Troy Miller. The writing staff were all excited about Dwight becoming manager, and there were numerous pitches for office policies that Dwight would institute, most of which they were not able to fit into the episode. The central plot point of the gun being fired was planned as the first act break, but was pushed back to the second act break so that more could be done with Dwight simply being manager. The original working title for this episode was "Interim Manager" but was considered too bland by The Office writer Mindy Kaling. While writing the episode, Spitzer originally titled it "Dwight K. Schrute", but decided the title was not descriptive enough, so he renamed it "Dwight K. Schrute, Interim Manager", before realizing that Acting Manager fits Dwight's role better and changed it to "Dwight K. Schrute, Acting Manager". Spitzer then decided that Dwight would downplay the acting part of the position and renamed the episode to its final title "Dwight K. Schrute, (Acting) Manager".

The episode features the return of Kathy Bates as Jo Bennett. This is her first on-screen appearance since "Nepotism". The long absence is due to her starring in another NBC series, Harry's Law. Jo has a different set of dogs than she did in previous episodes; the writers' intent was that Jo uses her dogs to accessorize, bringing different ones according to her outfit. The episode also marks the second appearance of Cody Horn as Jordan Garfield, Deangelo's executive assistant, and the first of three new roles since Carell's departure. The role was originally said to be recurring at first with a chance of her becoming a series regular in the eighth season. She did not return for the eighth season. The episode also features a voice guest appearance from former producer and writer for The Office Michael Schur as Mose Schrute, his first appearance on the show since "Counseling" due to his being the show runner for another NBC sitcom, Parks and Recreation.

For the scenes where Kevin enters his code at the copier, the actors were given a great deal of freedom to improvise. Rainn Wilson was also given the go-ahead to improvise for the scene where Dwight gives Kevin a massage, which was based on an idea from Mindy Kaling.

The official website for The Office included four cut scenes from "Dwight K. Schrute, (Acting) Manager" within a week of the episode's release. In the first, 66-second clip, Dwight shows the documentary crew his new office apparel including his desk modeled after Uday Hussein's desk. In the second, 77-second clip, Jim pranks Dwight by putting fake results from Jordan's surveillance of the office. In a talking head, Jordan grudgingly admits the prank was funny. In the third, 86-second clip, the staff complain about Dwight blocking their Internet activities. In the fourth, 49-second clip, Gabe attempts to get Erin back by using her love of Pixar films, but ultimately fails.

== Reception ==
=== Ratings ===
In its original American broadcast on May 13, 2011, "Dwight K. Schrute, (Acting) Manager" was viewed by an estimated 6.45 million viewers and received a 3.3 rating/9% share among adults between the ages of 18 and 49. This means that it was seen by 3.3% of all 18- to 49-year-olds, and 9% of all 18- to 49-year-olds watching television at the time of the broadcast. This marked a nine percent drop in the ratings from the previous episode making it the second-lowest-rated episode of the season in the 18–49 demographic, after "Todd Packer". "Dwight K Schrute, (Acting) Manager" was the sixth most-watched scripted show for the week of broadcast among adults aged 18–49.

=== Reviews ===
..."The Office" did just fine without Carell, or Will Ferrell, or any of the big names who are going to pass through in the finale. This was an episode of "The Office" filled only with familiar characters (even Jo's been around long enough that she counts), and a pretty good one, at that. I said last week that I didn't really want to start judging the post-Carell version of the show until Deangelo was gone. Well, he's gone, and the first real impression of the show after Michael was a strong one.

— Alan Sepinwall, HitFix

"Dwight K. Schrute, (Acting) Manager" received positive reviews from critics. IGN reviewer Cindy White commented: "This episode proved that the show can be funny without [Steve Carell]". She also praised Rainn Wilson and John Krasinski's performance in the episode, calling it "one of my favorite dynamics on the show". However, she criticized the Andy-Gabe-Erin love triangle storyline, commenting: "It's only been made worse by the way they've turned Gabe from meek, bumbling burocrat [sic] into unhinged stalker guy." She ultimately gave the episode an 8.0/10. Alan Sepinwall of HitFix called the episode "fun" and a "drastic improvement from 'The Inner Circle'". He mainly praised the return of "The Dwight/Jim dynamic", writing that he "briefly rethought the idea of Dwight as long-term boss", and went on to praise the writers for featuring Dwight as manager for only one episode. He ultimately concluded that "the first real impression of the show after Michael was a strong one." TV Squad writer Joel Keller was very positive towards the episode, commenting that "The story also gave me faith that Lieberstein and company might actually do a credible job of exploring the other folks in the office now that the show's dominant force, Michael, is gone".

The A.V. Club's Myles McNutt stated that "'Dwight K. Schrute, (Acting) Manager' demonstrated that the show is perfectly capable of being funny without Carell", but criticized the episode for not featuring more "subtle" humor. He ultimately gave the episode a B. Sam Morgan of Hollywood.com called the episode "fairly decent episode" commenting that the concept of the episode was similar to the 10th episode of the seventh season, "China". He also positively commented on Ellie Kemper's performance, writing that "She came into this series as a sketch actor but for the first time I think she finally started being an 'actor.'" Several commentators praised the scene featuring Dwight massaging Kevin's back. "Dwight K. Schrute, (Acting) Manager" was voted the fourth highest-rated episode out of 24 from the seventh season, according to an episode poll at the fansite OfficeTally; the episode was rated 8.81 out of 10. In another poll, the episode was voted the second-highest-rated out of 24 from the seventh season, according to a "Survivor" episode poll at the fansite OfficeTally.
