= Training Day (The Office) =

- The Office episode
- Episode no.: Season 7 Episode 20
- Directed by: Paul Lieberstein
- Written by: Daniel Chun
- Cinematography by: Matt Sohn
- Editing by: Claire Scanlon
- Production code: 7020
- Original air date: April 14, 2011
- Running time: 22 minutes

Guest appearance
- Will Ferrell as Deangelo Vickers

Episode chronology
← Previous "Garage Sale"	Next → "Michael's Last Dundies"
- The Office (American season 7)

"Training Day" is the twentieth episode of the seventh season of the American comedy television series The Office and the show's 146th episode overall. It originally aired on NBC on April 14, 2011. The episode was written by Daniel Chun and directed by Paul Lieberstein. This episode marks the first appearance of Deangelo Vickers (Will Ferrell) in the series.

The series depicts the everyday lives of office employees in the Scranton, Pennsylvania branch of the fictional Dunder Mifflin Paper Company. In the episode, Michael Scott's (Steve Carell) replacement appears in the office, to start receiving training from Michael. The new manager, Deangelo Vickers, has everyone hoping to make good first impressions: Andy Bernard (Ed Helms) finds himself awkwardly typecast while Jim Halpert (John Krasinski) and Pam Halpert (Jenna Fischer) worry that they've come on too strong. Only Dwight Schrute (Rainn Wilson) is apathetic about the new leader.

"Training Day" received mixed reviews from television critics, with many commenting on Ferrell's appearance. The episode was also viewed by 4.16 million viewers and received a 4.0/11 percent rating among adults between the ages of 18 and 49, ranking first in its timeslot. The episode ultimately ranked as the highest-rated NBC series of the night.

== Synopsis ==
Michael Scott, while waiting in a hotel bar for his replacement Deangelo Vickers, meets a man and the two hit it off. When Michael calls Deangelo to see where he is, it is revealed that the man Michael has been talking to is actually Deangelo, though it takes the two some time to realize this.

Deangelo comes to the branch the next day, and most of the staff is eager to make a good first impression. Kevin Malone wears his toupee, Jim and Pam Halpert believe they have started off well by mentioning their baby, and Deangelo designates Andy Bernard as the office "funny guy" when he reveals that he carries name tags around to avoid situations like the one Deangelo and Michael were in. Dwight Schrute is not pleased that he was not selected to replace Michael, believing that Michael put in a good recommendation for him. Michael becomes disturbed when Deangelo wants to make some changes, such as how Erin Hannon answers the phone.

While Deangelo gets annoyed with Jim and Pam, he loves the antics of Andy, who has resorted to physical comedy when his jokes fall flat, even eating soap at Deangelo's urging; Andy tells the camera with dazed sadness that "this is my life now". Deangelo's popularity with the employees makes Michael jealous to the point where he passes out peanut butter sandwiches, despite Deangelo's peanut allergy. Deangelo then assembles the staff in the "multipurpose room", including Dwight, who learned from Gabe Lewis that Michael did not put in a recommendation and thus snubs Michael. Jim quietly tells Michael that he chose to resign and needs to come to terms with that choice and the fact that life is going to go on at the office. Deangelo steps out of his meeting and asks Michael for advice for how to run the meeting, saying that he is a good manager and Dunder Mifflin will not be the same without him. The two make up with a reverse hug, Deangelo telling him he should start enjoying his retirement. Michael returns to his office while Deangelo conducts his meeting in the conference room.

In another effort to impress Deangelo, Jim and Pam bring in Cece, to which Deangelo reacts positively. While they celebrate getting back on his good side, Deangelo reveals to the camera that he is in fact indifferent to Cece and was just being polite.

== Production ==
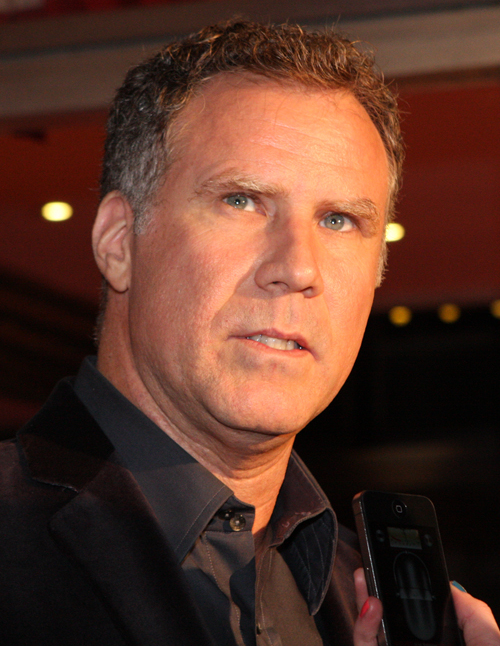
"Training Day" marked Will Ferrell's first of four appearances on The Office.

The episode was written by co-executive producer Daniel Chun, his fourth writing credit of the series. It was directed by then-showrunner Paul Lieberstein, his sixth directing credit of the series. The episode marked the first appearance of Will Ferrell's four-episode arc on the series and is also one of series star Carell's last episodes as a regular on the series. Ferrell signed on to appear in Steve Carell's final three episodes, and the first episode without Carell, "The Inner Circle", to make Carell's transition easier. Carell had decided to leave the series, because "I just think it's time... I want to fulfill my contract. When I first signed on I had a contract for seven seasons, and this coming year is my seventh. I just thought it was time for my character to go". Ferrell initially called the producers and offered to appear in Carell's last season, because he is "a fan and wanted to commemorate Carell’s swan song". He had previously starred alongside Carell in the 2004 film Anchorman: The Legend of Ron Burgundy.

The Season Seven DVD contains a number of deleted scenes from this episode. The cut scenes include a sequence in which Michael and Deangelo discuss cancer jokes and the 2010 film Megamind—an animated film that featured the voice of Ferrell—while drinking vodka, shots of Michael and Deangelo discussing their enjoyment for coffee, and Dwight attempting to appease his new boss. The Seasons 6-9 boxed set omits the deleted scene compilation and instead has a "Producer's Extended Cut" of the episode. This cut leaves out both some scenes that were in the broadcast cut and some of the scenes which appear in the Season Seven DVD deleted scenes (such as the discussion of Megamind), and includes some scenes which appear in neither source, such as a scene where Michael tries to embarrass Deangelo by showing the staff a photo of him when he was overweight, only for Deangelo to inspire the staff with the story of how he lost weight.

== Reception ==
=== Ratings ===
In its original American broadcast, "Training Day" was viewed by an estimated 7.871 million viewers and received a 4.0 rating/11% share among adults between the ages of 18 and 49. This means that it was seen by 4.0% of all 18- to 49-year-olds, and 11% of all 18- to 49-year-olds watching television at the time of the broadcast. This marked a rise in the ratings from the previous episode, "Garage Sale", which can be attributed to Ferrell's guest appearance. The episode ranked first in its timeslot, beating the Fox crime drama Bones, which scored a 3.5/10 percent relating in the 18–49 demographic; a rerun of the ABC medical drama Grey's Anatomy and a rerun of the CBS crime drama CSI: Crime Scene Investigation.

=== Reviews ===
"Training Day" received mixed reviews from television critics. IGN writer Cindy White wrote that Deangelo was not given a proper introduction and that he was not distinguished from Michael's character. She also went on to criticize Jim, Pam and Dwight's reaction to Deangelo as the new manager, particular that of Jim and Pam, writing that "it's becoming painfully obvious that the longtime writers don't know what to do with them anymore". However, she concluded that the episode continued the seventh season's improvement over the sixth, and that it showed potential for future episodes of the season. She ultimately gave the episode a 7.5 out of 10 rating, denoting a "good" episode. The A.V. Club reviewer Myles McNutt praised Michael's reactions to the office easily ignoring him for Deangelo, calling the final shot of him walking into his office alone "quite effective", and that Dwight's reaction to not being suggested to be Michael's replacement made it more "meaningful". Despite this, he continued by saying that the series was not "sophisticated" enough to use this plotline effectively and criticized the writing for the cast, which made them look "stupid" for "cheap humor" and a "enormously shallow laughter". He ultimately gave the episode a "C+". Alan Sepinwall, a columnist for HitFix, complimented the chemistry between Ferrell and Carell, but criticized the storyline which eventually came down to Michael "being petulant about not being the center of attention every minute of every day", negatively comparing it to "Viewing Party". Despite this, he noted that Ferrell's presence did involve several funny moments.

Bonnie Stiernberg, for Paste, was more positive, writing that she preferred the use of comedy, following the emotional episode, "Garage Sale". She ultimately gave it an 8.7 out of 10. Will Ferrell's performance was especially noted by critics. McNutt complimented Ferrell's "nuanced" performance, but called his character "uninteresting". Stiernberg praised his dynamic with Carell, comparing it to their previous roles in Anchorman. His later appearances in the series also received mixed reviews. For instance, McNutt called Ferrell's scenes a "momentum killer" in "Goodbye, Michael", whereas Rob Sheffield of Rolling Stone called his performance in the same episode "pure magic".
