= Todd Packer (The Office) =

- The Office episode
- Episode no.: Season 7 Episode 18
- Directed by: Randall Einhorn
- Written by: Amelie Gillette
- Cinematography by: Matt Sohn
- Editing by: Claire Scanlon
- Production code: 7018
- Original air date: February 24, 2011
- Running time: 22 minutes

Guest appearances
- David Koechner as Todd Packer; Hugh Dane as Hank Tate

Episode chronology
← Previous "Threat Level Midnight"	Next → "Garage Sale"
- The Office (American season 7)

"Todd Packer" is the eighteenth episode of the seventh season of the American comedy television series The Office, and the show's 144th episode overall. It originally aired on NBC on February 24, 2011. The episode was written by Amelie Gillette and directed by Randall Einhorn.

The series depicts the everyday lives of office employees in the Scranton, Pennsylvania branch of the fictional Dunder Mifflin Paper Company. In this episode, traveling salesman Todd Packer (David Koechner) comes to Dunder Mifflin looking for a desk job in the office. However, the office is unsure if they want him to work there due to his previous behavior. Jim Halpert (John Krasinski) and Dwight Schrute (Rainn Wilson) eventually team up and develop a scheme to rid the office of Packer. Meanwhile, after dealing with computer problems, Andy Bernard (Ed Helms) confronts Pam Halpert (Jenna Fischer) about getting a new computer.

The episode was the first entry in the series to be written by Gillette, who had written for the online entertainment newspaper and website The A.V. Club. The episode received mixed reviews from critics; while many did not enjoy the character of Todd Packer, others praised the temporary alliance between Jim and Dwight. "Todd Packer" was viewed by 6.121 million viewers and received a 3.2 rating among adults between the age of 18 and 49, making it the season's lowest-rated episode. Despite this, the episode was the highest-rated NBC series of the week that it aired.

== Plot ==
Traveling salesman Todd Packer comes to Dunder Mifflin looking for a desk job. However, most of the office does not want him to work there due to his previous behavior; Jim Halpert in particular is horrified at the idea. Holly Flax gives him a job as a salesman, forcing Dwight Schrute to leave his desk and move to the annex. Packer repeatedly offends everybody with his jokes, especially Kevin Malone, although Kevin pretends to play along. Only Michael Scott, Packer's longtime friend, is not offended by Todd. Holly, who was at first excited to have Packer in the office per Michael's recommendations, discovers how insensitive Packer is and asks Michael to get him under control. Michael and Packer have coffee in the lobby, where Packer says he wants to be a better person. Michael gets Packer to apologize, but everyone can tell that the apologies are insincere. Dwight and Jim scheme to get rid of Packer. They call him, pretending to be corporate offering him a job in Tallahassee, Florida, which Packer accepts. Michael overhears the call and goes to tell Packer that Dwight and Jim have tricked him. Before he has a chance, however, Packer insults Holly, and Michael decides to keep Dwight and Jim's scheme a secret and allow Packer to take the "job" in Florida. As Michael and Holly witness Packer drive away from the view in his office, Michael admits that Packer is "an ass" before they embrace.

When office administrator Pam Halpert gets a new computer for the receptionist's desk to replace the older model, Andy Bernard wants a new computer, too. Pam points out that if she were to get a new computer for one sales rep, she would have to get one for every sales rep. Unwilling to let it go, Andy convinces Erin Hannon to trade computers with him. Pam is angry when she finds out and forces him to switch the computers back. Andy confronts Pam about "humiliating" him in front of the office. In order to make it up to him, she tells him that the only way he can get a new computer is if his breaks. To accomplish this, he accepts all cookies, intentionally opens pop-up ads, and places food in the disc drive. Pam then buys Andy a new computer, but they scratch it up to make it not look brand new. When they pretend to argue about it in front of the office, Pam claims that she found it in the warehouse. Darryl Philbin confronts Pam later regarding finding the computer in the warehouse. As he knows everything that is in the warehouse and where it is stored, he leverages Pam to give him more sick days. Pam gleefully tells the interviewers that she is now "full-on corrupt".

== Production ==
This episode was written by Amelie Gillette, her first writing credit of the series. She was a writer for The A.V. Club before being hired for The Office. The episode was directed by longtime series director Randall Einhorn, and was his second credit for the season after "The Sting". The cold open, which featured Dwight eating canned foods from his survival shelter while his co-workers ridicule him, was actually filmed for the previous season and is featured in the blooper reel on the sixth season DVD and Blu-ray sets.

The Season Seven DVD contains four deleted scenes from this episode: Michael and Packer enter the office while Michael expresses his desire for Holly to agree to hiring Packer, Packer explains his weariness with life as a traveling salesman in a talking head, Michael and Holly argue about Packer, and Jim tries to convince Michael to leave Dwight's old desk empty following Packer's departure. Also included is footage cut from the scenes where Erin receives her new computer, Holly interviews Packer, Packer insults Kevin, and Andy and Pam make his new computer look used.

== Cultural references ==
Packer pretends to mistake Holly for actress Jennifer Aniston. Dwight angrily throws out Holly's miniature zen gardens and remarks, "What do you grow in this, bullcrap?" Packer calls Kevin, Holly, and Dwight, the "three muske-queers", a homophobic slur referencing the 1844 novel The Three Musketeers. Dwight notes that, had Kevin grown up in sumo culture, he would be considered a "promising up-and-comer". Holly makes a list of humorous individuals, ranging from most humorous to least: "Bill Cosby, Steve Martin, 'Charlie Bit My Finger,' Michael Scott […] Todd Packer". When asked if he would like hot chocolate, Packer notes that the only "hot chocolate" he likes is Vivica A. Fox. Jim mentions Justin Bieber, and Dwight says "Who is Justice Beaver?" This leads Jim to say sardonically, "A crime-fighting beaver". Following the episode's air date, the term "Justice Beaver" became a popular trend on Twitter, and led to a website in honor of the quote. When prank-calling Packer, Dwight continuously makes references to The Wizarding World of Harry Potter in Orlando, Florida.

== Reception ==
In its original American broadcast, "Todd Packer" was viewed by an estimated 6.121 million viewers and received a 3.2 rating/9% share. This means that it was seen by 3.2% of all 18- to 49-year-olds, and 9% of all 18- to 49-year-olds watching television at the time of the broadcast. This marked the lowest number of viewers for the series since the second season episode "Boys and Girls", which was viewed by 5.42 million viewers, as well as the lowest Nielsen rating for the series since the first season. Despite this, the episode became the highest-rated NBC program for the original week it aired and also became the sixteenth most-watched show for the week of broadcast among adults aged 18–49.

Myles McNutt of The A.V. Club, Gillette's former employer, awarded the episode a "B−" and noted that he did not like Todd Packer, nor the episodes where his character is intentionally supposed to be vile. He did, however, enjoy the fact that Packer's antics caused Jim and Dwight to unite in the face of a common enemy, a plot that McNutt said "had a scrappy feel to it". McNutt also called Kevin being "slowly broken by Packer's cruelty" an effective way to show how terrible Packer was to the morale of the office. He was, however, critical of Holly seeming unaware that "Michael may not be the best judge of whether or not someone is funny". At the end of his review, McNutt reminded readers that The A.V. Club specifically selected him as their new reviewer for the show because he did not know Gillette, thus avoiding a conflict of interest.

IGN writer Cindy White enjoyed the episode, but criticized the ending for being too similar to a scene from the original British version of The Office in which David Brent tells traveling salesman Chris Finch to "fuck off". She spoke highly of Jim and Dwight's storyline, writing that "I wish their final ruse had been a bit more original, but it served the purpose of getting rid of Packer". She gave the episode a 7.5 out of 10 rating, denoting a "good" episode.

Matt Richenthal of TV Fanatic awarded the episode four out of five stars and praised it for its temporary teaming up of Jim and Dwight. Alan Sepinwall enjoyed the continued exploration of Michael's maturation, but felt that because Packer was so infrequently seen on the show, he was stuck as "the American version of Finchy" from the original British series, and as such, did not fit into the show's dynamics. Sepinwall was further critical of the main story, calling it "flat and uncomfortable". However, he enjoyed the later part of Pam and Andy's storyline, as well as Jim and Dwight teaming up to beat Packer.
