= The Sting (The Office) =

- The Office episode
- Episode no.: Season 7 Episode 5
- Directed by: Randall Einhorn
- Written by: Mindy Kaling
- Cinematography by: Matt Sohn
- Editing by: David Rogers
- Production code: 7005
- Original air date: October 21, 2010
- Running time: 22 minutes

Guest appearance
- Timothy Olyphant as Danny Cordray

Episode chronology
← Previous "Sex Ed"	Next → "Costume Contest"
- The Office (American season 7)

"The Sting" is the fifth episode of the seventh season of the American comedy television series The Office and the shows 131st episode overall. It originally aired on NBC on October 21, 2010. The episode was written by co-executive producer Mindy Kaling and directed by Randall Einhorn. "The Sting" guest stars Timothy Olyphant as Danny Cordray.

The series depicts the everyday lives of office employees in the Scranton, Pennsylvania branch of the fictional Dunder Mifflin Paper Company. In the episode, a Dunder Mifflin client is stolen by a rival salesman named Danny Cordray (Olyphant), and Michael Scott (Steve Carell), Dwight Schrute (Rainn Wilson), and Jim Halpert (John Krasinski) decide to set up a sting in order to uncover his sales secret. Meanwhile, Andy Bernard (Ed Helms) starts a band when he learns that one of his old college friends has a successful music career.

"The Sting" is the first episode of the series to feature Olyphant, who appears in a recurring capacity during the seventh season. The episode received largely positive reviews from television critics, many of whom felt that while the main plot was not realistic, it was very humorous. "The Sting" was viewed by 6.87 million viewers and received a 3.4 rating among adults between the age of 18 and 49, marking a slight drop in the ratings when compared to the previous week. Despite this, the episode ranked second in its timeslot and was the highest-rated NBC series of the night that it aired.

== Synopsis ==
Dwight Schrute and Jim Halpert are sent on assignment to make a sales pitch to a client, and are eager to land the sale. However, Danny Cordray, a rival paper salesman from the very small Osprey company who steals more potential sales away from Dunder Mifflin than anyone, has also arrived for a sales pitch. Dwight also reveals that Danny had a romantic history with Pam Halpert four years previously. Jim and Dwight call in Michael Scott, who is ecstatic at getting a chance to make a sale, to come and try to save them. The company ends up taking Danny's offer, even after Michael promises at-cost paper sales and weekend delivery. The trio leaves the client's office and head back home, defeated.

During a brainstorm session, Michael, Jim, and Dwight decide to set up a sting operation to observe Danny's sales techniques. They set up Meredith Palmer as the CEO of the fictional company Solartech in Dwight's office, fitted with security cameras, and watch from another room. Danny is then sent in to try to make a sale. All starts well until Meredith attempts to seduce him. Dwight and Jim send in Oscar Martinez to save the sting, but Meredith strong-arms him into submission. After she does the same to Ryan Howard, Michael rushes in to call the whole thing off after Meredith's attempts to seduce Danny escalate. Danny becomes infuriated and walks off. Michael catches up to him and offers him a job, pointing out that with Sabre's better pricing, he could make more sales as a traveling salesman for them. He accepts the offer, and Michael introduces him as the new salesman to the office. The rest of the sales staff act disrespectful towards him, worrying that Danny will take their clients. Michael tells them how well sales numbers will go up with Danny as a part of the branch, and that he is not going to rescind Danny's job offer just because it makes the other salespeople uncomfortable. Before Dwight leaves for the day, he viciously insults Danny about his alleged mistreatment of Pam and client-stealing past, then immediately welcomes him to the company.

Andy Bernard starts a band after reading about how well one of his friends is doing in the music business. He manages to get Darryl Philbin and Kevin Malone to join him in writing a song, with Andy singing an anti-war song from the perspective of a little girl in falsetto. The song is poorly received by the rest of the office, specifically due to the “weird” notion of Andy singing in a little girl's point of view, and Andy returns to the drawing board. Seeing that Andy is dejected, Kevin and Darryl offer to stay and jam with him for a little extra time, and the trio come up with a lively song called "Bullfrog In Love".

== Production ==
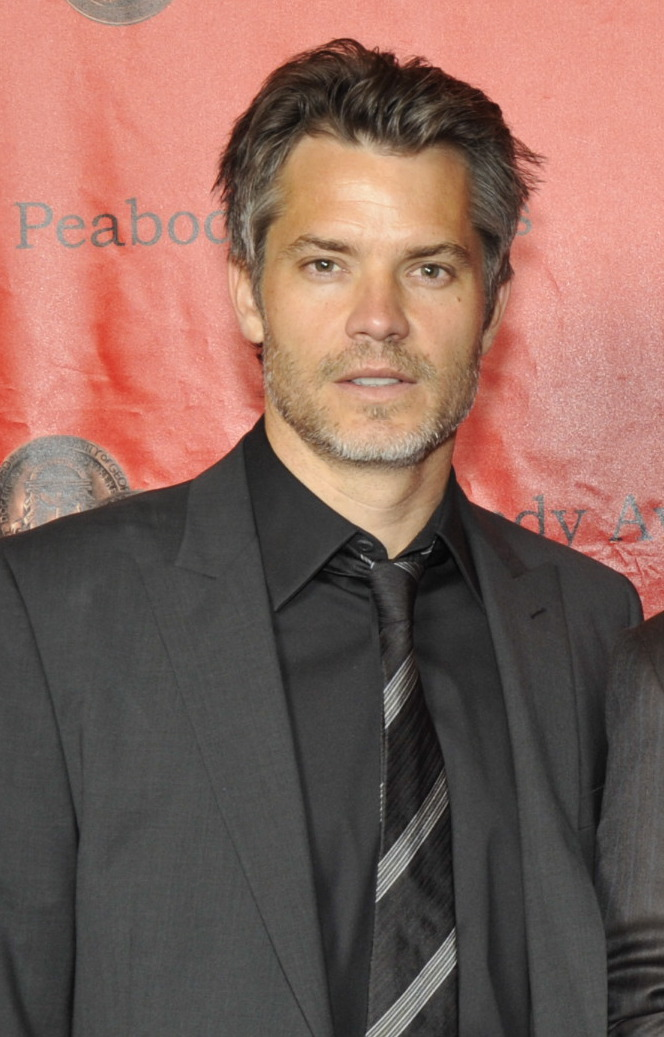
Timothy Olyphant guest starred as Danny Cordray in "The Sting"

"The Sting" was directed by Randall Einhorn and written by Mindy Kaling, who also plays Kelly Kapoor in the show. It was the first episode to feature Timothy Olyphant in a guest appearance as Danny Cordray, a rival paper salesman. Olyphant would return for the season's Halloween special, "Costume Contest", and would appear in a deleted scene for Carell's penultimate episode, "Michael's Last Dundies". Olyphant enjoyed his stint on the show, later telling IGN that filming both "The Sting" and his scenes for other episodes was "a blast" and "a kick to do" because The Office is "such a fun show, the nature of the whole thing. The way they do it is just so fun and easy."

The Season Seven DVD contains a number of deleted scenes from this episode. Notable cut scenes include Jim and Danny discussing Danny's success at selling his father's restaurant for a large amount of money, Michael expressing his delight at helping Jim and Dwight despite the fact that he is "an old man", Michael mistaking Danny for a male model, extended scenes of Andy's band, extra footage of Meredith flirting with Danny, Michael remembering that Danny was once a backpack model, and Danny saying that the only reason he will be working at Dunder Mifflin is because "they offered [him] a stupid amount of money".

== Cultural references ==
In the cold opening, Oscar shows the office his new bicycle, which Kevin notes is a Lance Armstrong model. Kelly is offended, because she is "team Sheryl Crow", a reference to the two's engagement and break up. The potential customer that Jim and Dwight are trying to woo shares the same name with famous athlete Steve Nash, and Jim has to explain to Dwight that the famous Nash is a point guard for the Phoenix Suns basketball team. Michael compares the plot to learn Danny's secret to the 1973 film The Sting, which starred Paul Newman and Robert Redford. Kelly notes that Danny reminds her of actor Josh Duhamel. The reason for Andy forming a band is that he discovers that his friend and rival Broccoli Rob (later played in the series by Stephen Colbert) collaborated with Trey Anastasio, the lead singer and songwriter from the jam band Phish, and wrote a song together. This plot device would later be mentioned in the ninth season episode "Here Comes Treble". Andy's band would become a minor story arc, and would reappear in the season eight episode "Pam's Replacement".

== Reception ==
In its original American broadcast on October 21, 2010, "The Sting" was viewed by an estimated 6.87 million viewers and received a 3.4 rating/9 percent share among adults between the ages of 18 and 49. This means that it was seen by 3.4 percent of all 18- to 49-year-olds, and 9 percent of all 18- to 49-year-olds watching television at the time of the broadcast. The episode's rating dropped 11 percent from the previous episode to its lowest ever fall telecast at the time. The episode ranked second in its timeslot, after an episode of the American Broadcasting Company (ABC) series Grey's Anatomy, and was the highest-rated NBC series of the night.

Myles McNutt of The A.V. Club rated the episode with an "A" grade. He felt the episode was the "highlight" of the season. McNutt applauded that Michael was portrayed in a way that was neither "too dumb or too ignorant" and that he was able to have the final moment where he showed that he was a skilled salesman. Despite noting that the sting was not realistic, he further enjoyed that Michael, Dwight, and Jim were allowed to react to the situation rather than becoming part of it. Jason Hughes of AOL's TV Squad gave the episode a positive review and praised the use of Meredith, calling her "hilarious and so spot-on". Furthermore, he, like McNutt, enjoyed that Michael was portrayed as competent in the end. Hughes also enjoyed the B-story and wrote that "it was a sweet moment when Darryl told Andy he didn't have to pay him any more to jam with them".

Entertainment Weekly's Margaret Lyons wrote that, while "its out-and-out silliness wasn't in the supertraditional Office style", she "totally dug it". Furthermore, she praised Kaling's writing, saying "Leave it to Mindy Kaling to deliver the best episode of The Office in a long, long time." Alan Sepinwall of HitFix gave the episode a mixed review. He felt the episode "was a complete cartoon" and also stated "It bore very little resemblance to what the show once was". Despite this he also stated, that "on its own completely absurd level, it worked" because it was very humorous; Sepinwall noted that he "found [himself] laughing a surprising amount of the time, even more than at previous episodes this season that felt more Office-like".

Bonnie Stiernberg of Paste magazine awarded the episode an 8.2 rating out of 10, noting that "The Office is at its best when it has one foot planted in reality and the other drifting off into the absurd." She also enjoyed that the show illustrated Michael's actual talents as a salesman. Furthermore, Stiernberg felt that Andy's subplot helped balance the "silliness" of Michael's main plot. Dan Forcella of TV Fanatic awarded the episode four-and-a-half stars out of five and praised Olyphant's acting, writing that he "just killed it" during his appearance. He also called the entry "a big step up from last week", largely due to its entertaining main plot and its "pleasant" B-story.
