= WUPHF.com =

- The Office episode
- Episode no.: Season 7 Episode 9
- Directed by: Danny Leiner
- Written by: Aaron Shure
- Cinematography by: Matt Sohn
- Editing by: Rick Weis
- Production code: 709
- Original air date: November 18, 2010

Guest appearances
- Kathy Bates as Jo Bennett (voice); Jack Coleman as Robert Lipton

Episode chronology
← Previous "Viewing Party"	Next → "China"
- The Office (American season 7)

"WUPHF.com" is the ninth episode of the seventh season of the American comedy television series The Office, and the 135th episode overall. Written by Aaron Shure and directed by Danny Leiner, the episode originally aired on NBC in the United States on November 18, 2010.

The series depicts the everyday lives of office employees at the Scranton, Pennsylvania branch of the fictitious Dunder Mifflin Paper Company. In the episode, Ryan Howard (B. J. Novak) and Michael Scott (Steve Carell) struggle to convince coworkers who have invested in Ryan's startup company that he can make it profitable. Meanwhile, Dwight Schrute (Rainn Wilson) hosts a hay festival in the parking lot of the building, distracting him from fulfilling a contract to Angela Martin (Angela Kinsey) to have sex. The episode received positive reviews and was nominated for the Writers Guild of America Award for Television: Episodic Comedy.

== Synopsis ==
Ryan Howard has convinced Michael Scott, Darryl Philbin, Stanley Hudson, Andy Bernard, and Pam Halpert to invest in his startup business, a cross-portal messaging system housed at WUPHF.com. (Note: As introduced in the episode "Whistleblower".) While Ryan touts a planned "investors ski weekend" and an offer to buy out WUPHF.com, he admits he only has nine days of funding left before his venture collapses. Ryan's subsequent sales pitch falls apart when he reveals that the potential buyer is the Washington University Public Health Fund, and everyone figures out their sole interest is the domain name because it contains their initials. While the other shareholders demand Ryan sell the company, Michael defends him, and because Michael is the majority shareholder, his decision stands.

Pam privately tells Michael that Ryan has never viewed Michael as a best friend, and is taking advantage of Michael's affection and loyalty for him. Pam reminds Michael that other people will lose their money if he and Ryan do not sell the company. Michael is silently hurt when Ryan refuses to have dinner with him and supports Michael's theoretical plan to get a second mortgage to fund WUPHF.com. While Michael refuses to sell the company, he pressures Ryan to save everyone's money and find a suitable course of action. Ryan, unable to make WUPHF.com profitable, decides to sell the company, to Michael's relief.

Meanwhile, Dwight Schrute hosts a hay festival in the parking lot for the Thanksgiving holiday, distracting him from a contractual obligation to have sex with Angela Martin. A frustrated Angela meets a charming, friendly man who is attending the festival with his young son. Angela discovers that he is a widower, and approves when he asks if he can call her sometime. Dwight appoints himself the "Hay Festival King", revealing that the entire purpose of the festival was to exorcise memories from his childhood, where his family would host hay festivals and he never was elected king for them. He arrives at his and Angela's warehouse rendezvous point to see their procreation contract has been stamped VOID.

Jim Halpert is in the midst of a record sales streak, but Angela informs Jim that Sabre instituted a commissions cap for the year and Jim maxed out his returns. Jim talks to Gabe Lewis, but Gabe cannot change the policy. Unmotivated to work, Jim struggles to entertain himself, and ends up editing CEO Jo Bennett's audiobook to trick Gabe into believing Bennett is reading her audiobook to him over the phone, forcing Gabe to stay late.

== Production ==
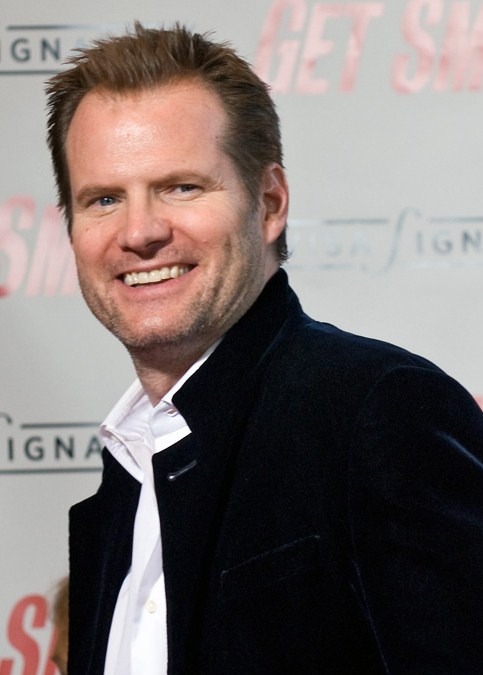
Jack Coleman (seen here in 2008) guest starred in this episode.

"WUPHF.com" was written by co-executive producer Aaron Shure, his fifth writing credit on the series, and directed by Danny Leiner, his first Office directing credit. Shure later commented that "The number of person hours that went into [the script]... crazy. 25 pages of notes from Jonathan Hughes and Kelly Hannon, writing assistants. And then we whittled that down to a beat sheet, and then to an outline, and then an initial draft, and then a lot changed after the table draft."

As usual for The Office, the actors stuck closely to the script with little improvisation, though Gabe Lewis's tangent about his gym's policy was improvised by Zach Woods.

While Dwight refers to his event as a hay festival and the venue as Hay Place, the production team used straw because hay is structurally more difficult to work with and carries the risk of combustion. The straw bales were rented from a farm in Palmdale, California.

To have Michael Scott singing a single line from the song "You May Be Right" by Billy Joel ("But it just may be a lunatic you're looking for"), the show had to pay $25,000 in licensing fees.

In a deleted scene, Michael seeks advice from Toby and overhears Sasha talking about Toby's ex-wife's new boyfriend over webchat.

== Reception ==
In its original American broadcast on November 18, 2010, "WUPHF.com" was viewed by an estimated 7.28 million viewers and received a 3.8 rating/10% share among adults between the ages of 18 and 49, improving from the prior week's episode.

For his work on this episode, Aaron Shure was nominated for a Writers Guild of America Award for Episodic Comedy.
