= The Inner Circle (The Office) =

- The Office episode
- Episode no.: Season 7 Episode 23
- Directed by: Matt Sohn
- Written by: Charlie Grandy
- Cinematography by: Sarah Levy
- Editing by: Claire Scanlon
- Production code: 7023
- Original air date: May 5, 2011

Guest appearances
- Will Ferrell as Deangelo Vickers; Cody Horn as Jordan Garfield

Episode chronology
← Previous "Goodbye, Michael"	Next → "Dwight K. Schrute, (Acting) Manager"
- The Office (American season 7)

"The Inner Circle" is the twenty-third episode of the seventh season of the American comedy television series The Office and the show's 149th episode overall. The episode originally aired on May 5, 2011, on NBC. The episode also marked Will Ferrell's final appearance as Deangelo, having signed up for four episodes. Cody Horn also makes her first guest appearance for the series as Jordan Garfield.

The series depicts the everyday lives of office employees in the Scranton, Pennsylvania branch of the fictional Dunder Mifflin Paper Company. In this episode, new office manager Deangelo begins picking favorites among the staff, revealing his true management style. After he only picks men to join his "inner circle", many of the female staffers begin to believe he is sexist.

The episode was written by Charlie Grandy and directed by Matt Sohn. The episode marks the first episode since Steve Carell left the series as a series regular. "The Inner Circle" received mixed reviews from critics, with many commenting on Ferrell's performance, with opinions ranging from positive to negative. According to Nielsen Media Research, the episode was viewed by an estimated 6.90 million households and received a 3.5 Nielsen rating and 10% share among adults between the ages of 18 and 49 marking a drop in the ratings from the previous episode, "Goodbye, Michael".

== Synopsis ==
New regional manager Deangelo Vickers picks favorites among the staff, including Kevin Malone, Jim Halpert, a sycophantic Gabe Lewis, and Darryl Philbin, who is attending business school thanks to Deangelo. He is also favorable towards Ryan Howard, who he believes is the head of the customer service department and Kelly Kapoor's direct supervisor. Kelly is irate at the situation, but Ryan agrees to be a more dutiful boyfriend in exchange for Kelly keeping up the charade. Andy Bernard desperately aspires to join the inner circle, while Deangelo attempts to win over Dwight Schrute, who is still apathetic toward the new boss. Angela Martin sees his style as sexist, as he never consults female department heads, and Pam Halpert agrees, as Deangelo has been acting coldly towards her; they persuade Jim to talk to Deangelo about it. To prove to the staff that he is not sexist, Deangelo hires a woman named Jordan Garfield, who has no business experience (having previously worked at Anthropologie) over other qualified candidates, including a friend of Pam's. Kelly attempts to tell Deangelo the truth about Ryan's position as a temp worker, but Ryan contradicts her, leaving Deangelo confused.

Jim is kicked out of the inner circle after reporting what the women of the office said, and an enthusiastic Andy replaces him (despite having denounced Deangelo as sexist). Pam interrupts a mock basketball session the inner circle is having in the office in order to quiet it down, and an annoyed Deangelo reinvites Jim back into the circle. Jim instead challenges him to try a real dunk, which Deangelo claims he can do, at the warehouse basketball hoop downstairs. Deangelo brings everyone down to the warehouse, including Dwight, who Deangelo finally loses his temper with and directly orders him downstairs or be fired (ironically earning Dwight's respect, as he "respond[s] to strong leadership"). Deangelo dunks from the free-throw line, then crashes down with the basketball stand on top of him. He is taken to the hospital, leaving Dunder Mifflin Scranton without a manager.

Deangelo makes it back to the office, still in his hospital gown, with an IV tube trailing from his arm. His attempts to tell a bar joke come out as random gibberish. Gabe and Jim lead him out of the office after Erin Hannon calls for an ambulance.

== Production ==
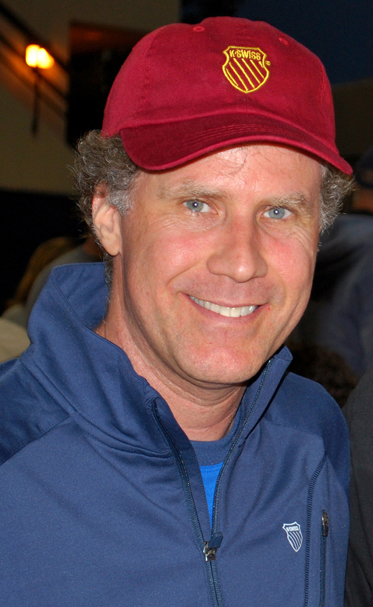
"The Inner Circle" marked Will Ferrell's fourth and last appearance on The Office.

The episode was written by supervising producer Charlie Grandy, his sixth writing credit of the series. It was directed by the series' cinematographer Matt Sohn, his second directing credit of the series. This is the first episode of The Office without former lead actor Steve Carell as Michael Scott. The feeling during filming was initially "weird", but the mood eventually changed to "very hopeful, excited and anticipatory feeling" according to Office showrunner Paul Lieberstein. The episode marked the final appearance in Will Ferrell's four-episode arc on the series after first appearing in "Training Day". The episode is also the first appearance of Cody Horn as Jordan Garfield, Deangelo's executive assistant, and the first of three new roles since Carell's departure. The role was originally said to be recurring at first with a chance of her becoming a series regular. She eventually did not return for the eighth season. In the final scene, Krasinski can be seen breaking character and putting his head down.

The official website for The Office included three cut scenes from "The Inner Circle" within a week of its release. In the first 38 second clip, Deangelo invites Dwight on a weekend trip to a Los Lobos concert which Dwight declines once he learns he can't drive the bus. In a talking head, Dwight reveals that Deangelo makes his skin crawl. In the second 144 second clip, Andy tries to become Deangelo's new executive assistant while in a talking head Pam decides to give up trying to impress Deangelo. It is also revealed in the same talking head that Michael named his new dog after Pam. In the third 82 second clip, Jim attempts to get back into the inner circle.

== Reception ==
=== Ratings ===
In its original American broadcast on May 5, 2011, "The Inner Circle" was viewed by an estimated 6.90 million households and received a 3.5 rating/10% share among adults between the ages of 18 and 49. This means that it was seen by 3.5% of all 18- to 49-year-olds, and 10% of all 18- to 49-year-olds watching television at the time of the broadcast. This marked a 17% drop in the ratings from the previous episode, "Goodbye, Michael", but marked a rise from the last regular episode, "Michael's Last Dundies". The episode tied for first in its timeslot beating Bones which received a 3.2 rating/9% share in the 18–49 demographic, CSI: Crime Scene Investigation which received a 2.3 rating/6% share and Nikita which received a 0.8 rating/2% share. The episode also tied for first in its timeslot with Grey's Anatomy. "The Inner Circle" was the fifth most-watched scripted show for the week of broadcast among adults aged 18–49.

=== Reviews ===
For now, at least, the show is no longer about discomfort, and it's no longer about drudgery. It's about all the quirky characters in an office, which isn't much different than any workplace sitcom that has been on TV in the last forty years. If this show didn't have seven years of history to back it up, this episode would have made you feel like you were watching Suddenly Susan without a laugh track.

— Joel Keller, TV Squad

The episode received mixed reviews from critics. The A.V. Club writer Myles McNutt compared the episode to "Training Day" commenting that "'The Inner Circle' is more successful than that episode ['Training Day'] on some levels", but "both episodes suffer from the same problem: They’re simply not very funny or meaningful, which I'd argue is even more problematic for "The Inner Circle" given its position in the season." He ultimately gave the episode a C−. TV Squad writer Joel Keller wrote that while "the episode did have its funny moments", "overall, you can just feel that the show has changed in a very fundamental way". Alan Sepinwall of HitFix criticized the writers for still not finding Deangelo's character out commenting that "the fact that the writers so clearly had no idea what to do with Ferrell doesn't fill me with confidence for whatever guest stars turn up in the final episodes – nor do I feel especially great right now about the idea of an outside character coming in as the permanent new regional manager."

IGN reviewer Cindy White praised the writing for Deangelo's character saying that "Ferrell is much better carrying the show on his own than being second banana to Carell. It seemed like he was having more fun with the role in this episode". She ultimately gave the episode a 7.0/10. New York's Phoebe Reilly wrote that "while it was nice to see the staff responding to someone new, it didn't feel like enough to make an audience antsy to come back after a long summer." Hillary Busis of Entertainment Weekly also gave the episode a mediocre review commenting that "judging by tonight's episode alone, the transition from the Carell era to the post-Carell era is going to be shaky, to say the least". "The Inner Circle" was voted the fourth lowest-rated episode out of 24 from the seventh season, according to an episode poll at the fansite OfficeTally. In another poll, the episode was voted the third lowest-rated episode out of 24 from the seventh season and was rated 6.86 out of 10.
