= Amelie Gillette =

American screenwriter

Amelie Gillette is an American newspaper columnist and television writer. She wrote the weekly infographic "The Tolerability Index" for The A.V. Club for 10 years and was a writer for the US version of The Office. She has written for many publications, including Spin, The Believer, and Blender.

== Early life ==
Gillette is from New Orleans, Louisiana. She attended New York University, where she wrote for Washington Square News. After graduation, she worked as a freelance writer and taught English in Italy.

== The A.V. Club (2006–2016) ==
Gillette began writing for The Onion's entertainment newspaper The A.V. Club in 2006. She wrote "The Hater" column and "The Tolerability Index" infographic, and was the featured performer of The Hater podcast. The last Hater column was published in 2010, but she continued to write "The Tolerability Index" until 2016. She has also written headlines for The Onion.

== Television writing (2010–present) ==
Gillette joined the writing staff of The Office beginning in its seventh season. She had met Office cast member Ellie Kemper a few times prior to joining The Office writing staff, since Kemper was a writer for The Onion and McSweeney's. She joined the staff of the NBC sitcom Animal Practice in 2012; however, the show was cancelled before her credited episode, "Wingmen," aired. The episode later appeared in a Spring 2013 "burn off."

== Personal life ==
Gillette is married to actor Mark Proksch.

== The Office episodes ==
- "Todd Packer"
- "Special Project"
