= Viewing Party =

- The Office episode
- Episode no.: Season 7 Episode 8
- Directed by: Ken Whittingham
- Written by: Jon Vitti
- Cinematography by: Matt Sohn
- Editing by: Claire Scanlon
- Production code: 7008
- Original air date: November 11, 2010
- Running time: 22 minutes

Episode chronology
← Previous "Christening"	Next → "WUPHF.com"
- The Office (American season 7)

"Viewing Party" is the eighth episode of the seventh season of the American comedy television series The Office, and the show's 134th episode overall. Written by Jon Vitti and directed by Ken Whittingham, the episode aired on NBC in the United States on November 11, 2010.

The series—presented as if it were a real documentary—depicts the everyday lives of office employees in the Scranton, Pennsylvania, branch of the fictional Dunder Mifflin Paper Company. In the episode, Erin Hannon (Ellie Kemper) and Gabe Lewis (Zach Woods) invite the office to Gabe's house for a Glee viewing party. Michael Scott cannot handle the fact that the office workers think of Gabe as their boss instead of him. Growing more jealous of Gabe and Erin's relationship, Andy Bernard (Ed Helms) goes to extremes in order to impress her. Dwight Schrute (Rainn Wilson) helps Pam Halpert (Jenna Fischer) with Cece, much to her husband Jim's (John Krasinski) chagrin.

The episode featured several direct references to the Fox series Glee, in addition to various other cultural references. "Viewing Party" was viewed by 7.15 million viewers and received a 3.6 rating among adults between the age of 18 and 49, marking a decrease in the ratings when compared to the previous week. The episode was also the highest-ranked NBC series of the night, and it received moderately positive reviews from critics with one main detractor; many reviewers enjoyed the character interaction and development.

== Synopsis ==
Michael Scott becomes frustrated when Kevin Malone refers to Gabe Lewis as his boss. Erin Hannon and Gabe invite the office to Gabe's house for a Glee viewing party. When the show starts, Michael and Gabe get into an argument over how high the volume should be. Michael retreats to Gabe's bedroom, hoping that his employees will follow him there. Meanwhile, Pam Halpert has been having a hard time with getting her daughter Cece to go to sleep at night, so Dwight Schrute picks her up, and she becomes quiet.

Jim Halpert changes the channel from the Glee episode so he can check sports scores. Oscar Martinez asks Jim to change the channel back to Glee, but discovers that Erin neglected to record the episode. To avoid his co-workers' anger, Jim goes into the bedroom to see Dwight holding a sleeping Cece. Angela comes in and demands that Dwight meet her outside for sex. Determined to end Cece's "reverse cycling", Pam persuades Dwight to stay with the baby under the condition that Jim feeds Dwight pizza and beer while Pam goes outside to tell Angela that Dwight cannot see her.

While observing Gabe's room, Ryan Howard tells Andy Bernard that a Chinese virility supplement that Gabe keeps in his room is incredibly potent. Once alone, Andy drinks the entire bottle of the supplement, which makes him intoxicated, prompting him to admit to Phyllis Vance he is jealous of Gabe's relationship with Erin. Phyllis volunteers to talk to Erin and find out if she is having sex with Gabe, but as Phyllis is fairly intoxicated herself, her inquiries segue into an explicit account of her sexual experiences with her husband Bob, which mortifies Erin. Andy's intoxication turns into sickness, and he retreats to Gabe's room and vomits on the bed. He is comforted by Gabe, who plays his self-composed soundscapes.

Irritated that no one joined him in walking out on Gabe, Michael goes outside and pulls the cable connection, causing it to turn off. Hysteria erupts, and Michael becomes self-conscious over the commotion he has caused. He goes outside to fix the cable. There he is discovered by Erin, who throughout the evening has been encouraging Michael to bond with Gabe. Michael, still indignant that his office views Gabe as his boss, is irritated by her efforts, but eventually realizes that Erin views him as a father figure. He jokes around and tells her to go to her room, and she joins the roleplay. As he leaves the party, Michael brings Gabe into the joke by threatening to kill him and his family if he breaks Erin's heart.

== Production ==
The episode was written by Jon Vitti, a long-time writer on The Simpsons. It was his first writing credit for The Office after joining the show in the seventh season as a consulting producer. It was directed by Ken Whittingham, who has directed several episodes of The Office previously.

The Season Seven DVD contains a number of deleted scenes from this episode. Notable cut scenes include Gabe inviting Stanley to his party and Stanley's uncharacteristically elated reaction, Michael making fun of Gabe and then noting in a talking head that he does not really know Gabe, Michael raiding Gabe's kitchen cabinet for pizza toppings, Michael comparing himself to Tom Hanks in the 1988 film Big and Gabe to Hanks in the 1993 film Philadelphia, Michael eating his vanilla granola and mini pasta pizza and pretending to enjoy it, and Pam and Jim marveling at Cece sleeping.

== Cultural references ==
Gabe compares the Scranton Strangler to the Waco siege; Erin incorrectly believes he is mispronouncing "wacko". Jim says that the Scranton Strangler car chase, witnessed in the episode's cold opening, is on the same level as "Balloon Boy" and Michael Jackson's funeral. The Glee episode viewed during the party is the season two episode "Duets". When turning up the volume at the party, Michael comments, "Turn it up to eleven. Spinal Cord", an obvious mis-reference to This Is Spinal Tap. Michael comments that his favorite character on Glee is "the invalid", a reference to character Artie Abrams. Abrams is played by Kevin McHale, who appeared in the season four episode of The Office, "Launch Party", as the pizza delivery boy.

== Reception ==
"Viewing Party" aired on NBC on November 11, 2010. In its original American broadcast, it was viewed by an estimated 7.15 million viewers and received a 3.6 rating/10 percent share among adults between the ages of 18 and 49. This means that 3.6 percent of all 18- to 49-year-old households watched the episode, and ten percent of that demographic had their televisions tuned to the channel at any point. The night that this episode aired, the NBC affiliate in Baltimore carried the Ravens vs. Falcons NFL game, meaning that ratings for the regular Thursday NBC programming were lower than usual.

Myles McNutt of The A.V. Club awarded the episode a "B". He compared it to the earlier seventh season episode "Sex Ed", writing that both featured "a Michael story wherein a large collection of unfortunate behaviors is capped off with a moment of sincerity"; however, McNutt criticized this narrative structure, calling it "a bit cheap". He felt that the Dwight, Jim, Pam, and Cece subplot "was successful in that it stayed true to the office dynamic", and that the actual viewing of the Glee episode was a "highlight" because it showcased the characters "fall[ing] into some really fun (and familiar) tropes." Bonnie Stiernberg of Paste magazine awarded the episode an 8.4 out of 10, and called it "a solid episode". She argued that "it left me wanting to tune in next week and see what’ll happen next", largely because of the "surprising amount of character development".

Dan Forcella of TV Fanatic awarded the episode four out of five stars. He was complimentary towards the main plot, and he felt empathy towards Michael because he felt that "Gabe is the absolute worst". In addition, Forcella wrote that Pam and Jim's subplot "had its moments, as well", and called the scene featuring Jim feeding Dwight pizza "fantastic". Alan Sepinwall gave the episode a critical review, calling it "dreadful". Although he said it was better than "Christening", he felt that "so, so much of the episode didn't work". Sepinwall felt that the major problem with the episode was that it was "lifeless" and "light on jokes", and only featured "Michael being petulant and crabby for a whole episode", rather than featuring him in a character study. He concluded that "Ellie Kemper and Steve Carell almost were able to save the episode in the closing moments with Erin's reaction to Michael declaring that he's not her father, [but] it came far too late in an episode that was more concerned with Andy vomit humor."
