= Michael's Last Dundies =

- The Office episode
- Episode no.: Season 7 Episode 21
- Directed by: Mindy Kaling
- Written by: Mindy Kaling
- Cinematography by: Matt Sohn
- Editing by: Claire Scanlon
- Production code: 7021
- Original air date: April 21, 2011
- Running time: 22 minutes

Guest appearances
- Will Ferrell as Deangelo Vickers; Jack Coleman as Robert Lipton

Episode chronology
← Previous "Training Day"	Next → "Goodbye, Michael"
- The Office (American season 7)

"Michael's Last Dundies" is the twenty-first episode of the seventh season of the American comedy television series The Office and the show's 147th episode overall. It originally aired on NBC on April 21, 2011. The episode was written and directed by co-executive producer Mindy Kaling. "Michael's Last Dundies" guest stars Will Ferrell as Deangelo Vickers and Jack Coleman as State Senator Robert Lipton.

The series depicts the everyday lives of office employees in the Scranton, Pennsylvania branch of the fictional Dunder Mifflin Paper Company. In the episode, Michael Scott (Steve Carell) trains his office replacement, Deangelo Vickers, on how to properly host the branch's annual Dundie Awards. Michael soon learns that Deangelo has a terrible problem with speaking in front of others. Meanwhile, Erin Hannon (Ellie Kemper) grows to dislike her boyfriend, Gabe Lewis (Zach Woods).

The episode—which was originally going to be called "Goodbye, Michael Part 1"—was the first installment in the series to be both written and directed by Kaling, who also portrays Kelly Kapoor on the series. The episode also marks the second appearance of Ferrell as Deangelo Vickers; Ferrell had signed onto the series to make Carell's exit transition easier. The episode received mostly positive reviews from television critics. "Michael's Last Dundies" was viewed by 6.849 million viewers and received a 3.3 rating among adults between the age of 18 and 49. The episode was the highest-rated NBC series of the week that it aired, as well as the sixth-most watched episode in the 18–49 demographic for the week it aired.

== Plot ==
Michael Scott announces to the employees that Deangelo Vickers will be his co-host at the Dundies, an annual award program created by Michael to motivate his employees. The idea of performance is worrisome to Deangelo, but Michael insists he take the job. Michael brings some of the staff together in the conference room to help Deangelo get prepared for the show, but he struggles to be humorous. Andy Bernard tries to help him, saying he should just think of performing like conducting a meeting, but Michael objects, wanting Deangelo to mimic his style. Michael tries a number of different things to help Deangelo, such as sitting on his stomach and making him listen to a Walkman at full volume so he cannot hear himself think, but none are effective.

Meanwhile, Jim and Pam Halpert see Erin Hannon eating lunch alone in her car. She explains that she has begun doing this to get some time away from Gabe Lewis, whom she is starting to despise. Pam advises Erin to tell Gabe her real feelings as soon as possible.

The employees celebrate the Dundies at an Italian restaurant named Louie Volpe's. Moments after being introduced, Deangelo disappears into the bathroom to vomit. Michael psychs him up, and the show begins. The show continues to go poorly, with most of Michael's jokes offending more than amusing the employees. Dwight wins the "Promising Assistant Manager" Dundie, but as he is still mad at Michael for not recommending he replace Michael, he tosses his award in the trash. Erin wins the "Cutest Redhead" award and gives a speech in which she breaks up with Gabe, who leaves in humiliation. Michael awards Deangelo with the "Best Dundies Host" award. The staff urges him to make a speech, but as he nervously yells over his Walkman, the ceremony is kicked out of the restaurant. Michael is upset that his last Dundies Award show was a disappointment, but the staff convinces him to continue the event at the office.

After Dwight, still angry with Michael, insults the Dundies and leaves, Michael and Deangelo continue the event in the conference room. After the last award, Andy leads the employees in serenading the soon-to-depart Michael with an altered version of the song "Seasons of Love"; Michael is touched.

== Production ==
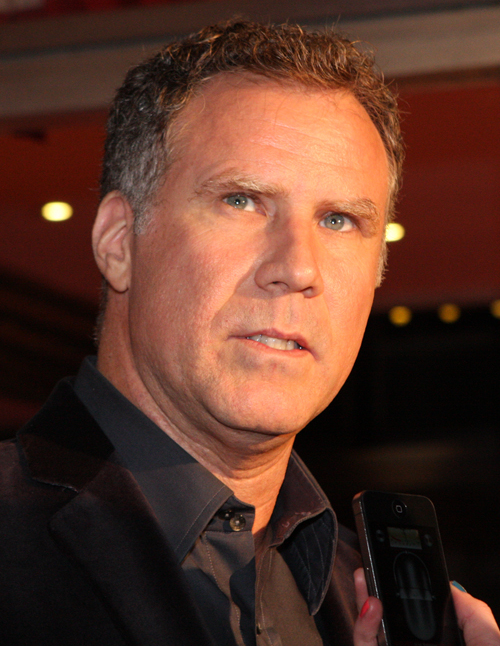
"Michael's Last Dundies" marked Will Ferrell's second appearance on The Office.

"Michael's Last Dundies" was written and directed by co-executive producer Mindy Kaling, the first time that she has both directed and written an episode of the series. Kaling was also the writer of the second season episode "The Dundies", an episode to which "Michael's Last Dundies" serves as a sequel in many ways. The episode was originally titled "Goodbye, Michael Part 1" before NBC announced that "Goodbye, Michael" would be an extended 36-minute episode and this episode was re-titled "Michael's Last Dundies". In the episode, a cue card features Dwight's last name spelled incorrectly as "Shrute". Kaling later admitted on Twitter that she had spelled the name that way "in every script I've written since 'Hot Girl'."

The episode is the second of Will Ferrell's four-episode guest stint on the series. Ferrell signed on to appear in Carell's final three episodes, and the first episode without Carell, "The Inner Circle", to make Carell's transition easier. Ferrell initially called the producers and offered to appear in a few episodes in Carell's last season, because he is "a fan and wanted to commemorate Carell’s swan song". He had previously starred alongside Carell, in the 2004 film, Anchorman: The Legend of Ron Burgundy.

The Season Seven DVD contains a number of deleted scenes from this episode. Notable cut scenes include Michael talking about his last Dundies using David Letterman routines as examples, Dwight booing Deangelo in order to adequately prepare him for his actual speech, Phyllis and Angela accepting their awards, Michael interviewing Danny Cordray (Timothy Olyphant) at his house, and Andy talking to Erin about loading the printer so that she can take her mind off of Gabe.

== Cultural references ==
In this episode, Michael Scott describes the Dundies as "like the Golden Globes but less mean", referring to Ricky Gervais' hosting of the 2011 Golden Globe Awards, which left critics questioning if he had gone "too far". As executive producer of the American series and co-creator of the original British series, Gervais stated on his blog that the line was intended as "a little in-joke". Near the beginning of the episode, Deangelo compares Meredith Palmer's house to the aftermath of Hurricane Katrina. Michael says that "When Larry King died, they didn't just cancel his show", showing that Michael is unaware that Larry King was not deceased. Later, he says that "they got Piers Morgan to come in and do his show" instead. The final song that the office sings to Michael is a parody of "Seasons of Love" from the Broadway musical Rent. Dwight later reveals in a talking head that he is always the padawan, and never a Jedi, a play on the expression "Always the bridesmaid, never the bride" which references the Star Wars franchise. Michael notes that he wanted his last Dundies celebration to be like the 1990 film The Godfather Part III, rather than the "confusing" 1972 film The Godfather I, which he notes had "three big laughs". Additionally, the episode contains several references to the film The King's Speech, notably during the scene in which Deangelo gives his speech at the Dundies while listening to his Walkman played at a high volume.

== Reception ==
In its original American broadcast, "Michael's Last Dundies" was viewed by an estimated 6.849 million households and received a 3.3 rating/10% share in the 18–49 demographic. This means that it was seen by 3.3% of all 18- to 49-year-olds, and 9% of all 18- to 49-year-olds watching television at the time of the broadcast. This marked a significant drop in the ratings from the previous episode, "Training Day". Despite this, the episode became the highest-rated NBC program for the original week it aired and also became the sixth-most-watched show for the week of broadcast among adults aged 18–49.

'Michael’s Last Dundies' obviously wants to take on a particular meaning given that final song [...] As a result, I think it is perfectly fair to hold the show accountable for the fact that the rest of it was built around a transparent set of bits being played by two actors, not two characters, and to wish that the big picture was more than just a musical afterthought in Carell’s next-to-last episode.

— Myles McNutt, The A.V. Club

The episode received a moderately positive review from Cindy White of IGN. She said "the laughs were scarce this episode" but the lack of humor was compensated by the "emotional highlights". However, she praised the performances of many of the supporting cast. She ultimately gave the episode a 7 out of 10, denoting a "good" episode. Alan Sepinwall of HitFix felt that the episode was "very up-and-down", largely due to inconsistent writing. He did, however, feel that the ending song was "beautiful" and "enough to justify" the episode. Dan Forcella of TV Fanatic awarded the episode four-and-a-half stars out of five and called it "funny and sweet" and "a perfect penultimate episode for Steve Carell".

Myles McNutt of The A.V. Club awarded the episode a "B−". He felt that it was appropriate that Steve Carell's time on the series was bookended largely by the Dundies; he noted that the episode in which the awards were introduced—the eponymous second season entry—served as "a second pilot of sorts" for the series, and the idea to bring the Dundies back made sense at the time in order to see how the characters had grown. However, he felt that the episode at large did not live up to its source material, and that it was "occasionally funny but unfortunately meaningless". The ending song, however, in McNutt's opinion, was a highlight of the episode.

Will Ferrell's character received criticism in the episode. White criticized Deangelo Vickers, noting that she did not have a handle on the character and that he was too "downright normal" and "practically boring". McNutt argued that, while Ferrell "is not really the problem with the role" of Deangelo Vickers, the actions between Ferrell and Carell felt more like "hanging out to commemorate the former’s departure from a television show" rather than the two playing believable characters. He also felt that Deangelo "feels disruptive to the show’s narrative" because his character gets in the way of the plot. Sepinwall felt that parts of the episode fell flat because it spent "so much time giving Will Ferrell stuff to do". He further noted that "nobody has come up with a good reason for him being here other than that he's Will Ferrell."
