= Jack Coleman (actor) =

American actor & screenwriter (born 1958)

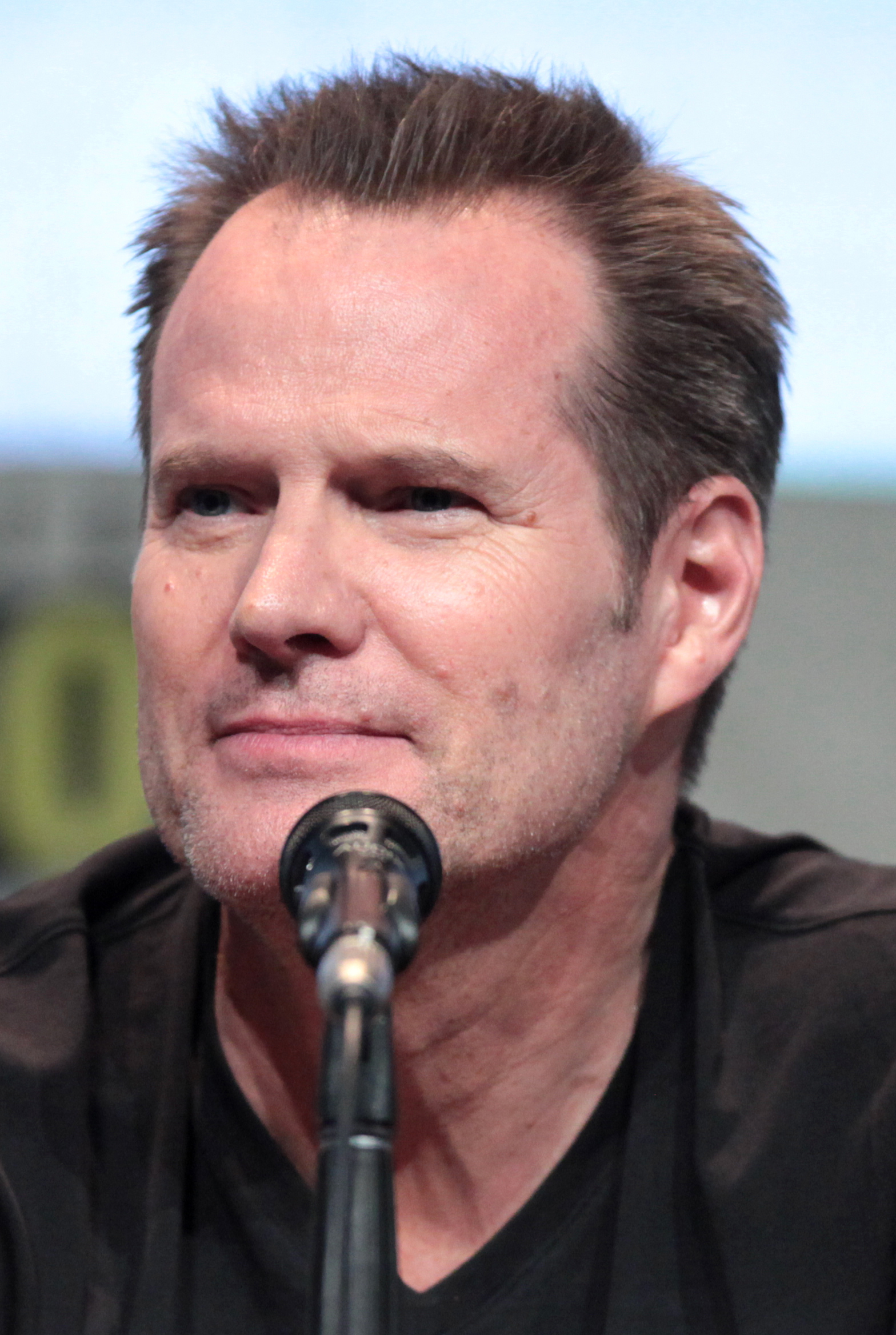
- Coleman in July 2015
- Born: John MacDonald Coleman; February 21, 1958 (age 68); Easton, Pennsylvania, U.S.
- Education: Duke University
- Occupation: Actor
- Years active: 1981–present
- Spouse: Beth Toussaint (m. 1996)
- Children: 1

John MacDonald Coleman (born February 21, 1958) is an American actor known as Steven Carrington on Dynasty (1982–1988), Noah Bennet in Heroes (2006–2010), State Senator Robert Lipton on The Office (2010–2013), and US Senator William Bracken on Castle (2012–2015).

== Early life and education ==
Coleman was born February 21, 1958, in Easton, Pennsylvania, in the Lehigh Valley region of eastern Pennsylvania. He is a sixth-generation descendant of Benjamin Franklin. He attended Solebury School in Solesbury Township, Pennsylvania, and Duke University, where he decided to pursue acting as a career. After graduating from Duke in 1980, he attended Eugene O'Neill Theater Center in Waterford, Connecticut.

== Career ==
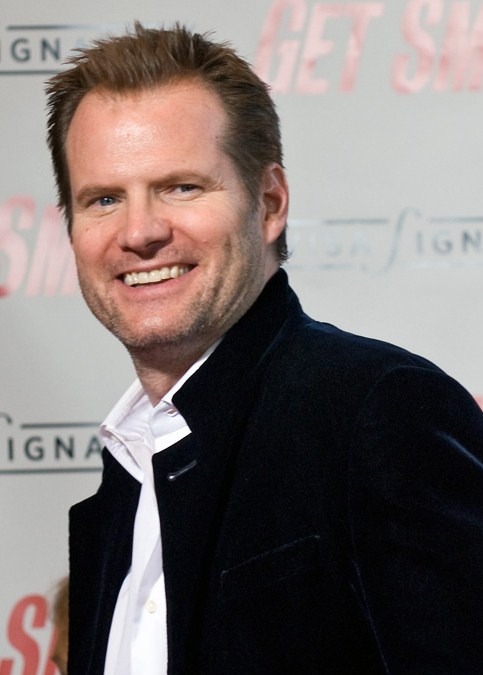
Coleman in June 2008

Coleman's first major role was in Days of Our Lives, where he appeared from 1981 to 1982 as the character of Jake Kositchek (aka The Salem Strangler). He also made an appearance on Celebrity Bullseye. In 1982, he joined the cast of Dynasty when he took over the role of Steven Carrington, one of the first gay characters on American television, his changed appearance explained as due to plastic surgery after an oil rig accident. He played the role until the end of the show's eighth season in 1988.

He was a regular on the short-lived series Nightmare Cafe (1992) and appeared on the miniseries Kingdom Hospital (2004). He made guest appearances in The Net, CSI: Miami, Nip/Tuck, Without a Trace, Diagnosis: Murder, and Entourage. He co-starred as Reed Callum, the father of Alyson and Amanda Michalka's characters, in the Disney Channel film Cow Belles.

He was nominated for his performance in the play Stand-up Tragedy at the Mark Taper Forum and won a Los Angeles Drama Critics Circle Award for his performance in Bouncers. He wrote the screenplays for Studio City, which he produced and acted in, and Can't Help Falling.

=== Heroes ===
Coleman was a main cast member of science-fiction series Heroes, in which he played Noah Bennet. Coleman states about portraying the character, "It's a combination of the light and dark. I don't want to just be a moustache twirling villain." In 2015, he reprised his role as Noah Bennet in an "event miniseries" Heroes Reborn, which served as a continuation of the original Heroes storyline.

=== 2010–present ===
Coleman appeared in an episode of The Mentalist in October 2010. He played the role of a wealthy, arrogant murder suspect named Max Winter. He also played a patient named Joe Dugan (a campaign manager of a New Jersey senator) in the House episode "Office Politics" in 2010.

In Hallmark Channel’s film Rock The House (2010), Coleman played a lawyer named Max who finds a way to reconnect with his daughter and his old sense of joy when he gets back together with his music-making friends from his teenaged years. Starting in November 2010, Coleman had a recurring role on The Office as Pennsylvania State Senator Robert Lipton, the love interest for both Angela Martin (Angela Kinsey) and Oscar Martinez (Oscar Nunez). He appeared in the episodes "WUPHF.com", "Classy Christmas", "Michael's Last Dundies","Goodbye, Michael", "Jury Duty", "Fundraiser", "Free Family Portrait Studio", "New Guys", "Here Comes Treble", "The Boat", "The Whale", "Customer Loyalty" and "Vandalism".

From 2011 to 2012, Coleman played Bill Forbes on the third season of the CW drama The Vampire Diaries. In 2011, he appeared on the CBS drama Criminal Minds, playing Bill Rogers, a serial rapist, in the episode "Hope". In July 2012, it was announced that Coleman joined the fifth season of Castle as a new antagonist for Stana Katic’s character Kate Beckett. He has appeared in the episodes "After the Storm", "Recoil", "In the Belly of the Beast", "Veritas", "XY", and "XX" playing Senator William Bracken.

Coleman joined USA Network’s Burn Notice as a recurring part of the drama's truncated (13-episode) seventh and final season. He played Andrew Strong, a ranking CIA officer who has seen it all. Noble, but also obsessive at times, Strong is a relentless taskmaster who pushes Michael (Jeffrey Donovan) to do whatever it takes to complete the mission.

In 2013, he played the closeted gay husband Daniel Douglas Langston of conservative Vice President Sally Langston on Scandal. In February 2014, he appeared in the CSI: Crime Scene Investigation episode "Love for Sale".

In 2019, he starred in the film adaptation of Graham Farrow's stage play Rattlesnakes.

== Personal life ==
Coleman married actress Beth Toussaint in 1996. They have a daughter, Tess, born in 1999.

== Filmography ==
=== Film ===
Year	Film	Role	Notes
1988	The Pursuit of Happiness	Stan	
1994	Foreign Student	Rex Jennings	
1997	Spawn	Doctor	
1997	Time Under Fire	Lance McCarthy	
1998	The Landlady	Patrick Forman	
2003	Studio City	Andrew Mason	
2008	Beautiful Loser	Jimmy	
2011	The Contract	The Patron	Short
2013	Emit	Rance Wofford	Short
2015	The Tank	Reed Baker	
2016	The Submarine Kid	Mr.Koll	
2019	Rattlesnakes	Richie Hanson	

=== Television ===
Year	Title	Role	Notes
1981–1982	Days of Our Lives	Jake Kositchek	Main role
1982–1988	Dynasty	Steven Carrington	Main role 148 episodes
1984	Glitter	Rusty Walker	Episode: "In Tennis, Love Means Nothing"
1985	Finder of Lost Loves	Dr. Eric Jordan	Episode: "Wayward Dreams"
1985	The Love Boat	Scott Barrett	Episode: "The Racer's Edge"
1986	The Colbys	Steven Carrington	Episode: "The Wedding"
1989	Bridesmaids	Matt	Television film
1990	Daughter of Darkness	Devlin	Television film
1990	Children of the Bride	Dennis	Television film
1991	The Return of Eliot Ness	Gil Labine	Television film
1992	Nightmare Cafe	Frank Nolan	Main role (6 episodes)
1993	Rubdown	Marion Pooley	Television film
1995	Trapped in Space	Grant	Television film
1995	Diagnosis: Murder	Eddie Gault	Episode: "A Blast from the Past"
1995	Burke's Law	Ted D'Arcy	Episode: "Who Killed the Sweet Smell of Success?"
1995	Touched by an Angel	Jeff Ritchy	Episode: "Angels on the Air"
1997	Angels in the Endzone	Peter Harper	Television film
1997	Medusa's Child	Dean Cooper	Television film
1998	The Naked Truth	Colin Terell	2 episodes
1998–2000	Oh Baby	Rick	Recurring role (11 episodes)
1998	The Net	Dr. Steven Graf	Episode: "Transplant"
1999	Replacing Dad	Dr. Mark Chandler	Television film
1999	Last Rites	Agent Gary Blake	Television film
2001	Special Unit 2	George Armstrong	Episode: "The Drag"
2001	Providence	Larry	Episode: "The Mating Dance"
2002	Becker	Tony	Episode: "The 100th"
2003	According to Jim	Sean Curran	Episode: "No Harm, No Fowl"
2004	Kingdom Hospital	Peter Rickman	Main role; 13 episodes
2004	Nip/Tuck	Dr. Avery Atherton	Episode: "Rose and Raven Rosenberg"
2004	CSI: Miami	Martin Gillespie	Episode: "Murder in a Flash"
2004	Without a Trace	Roy Ducek	Episode: "Trials"
2006–2010	Heroes	Noah Bennet	Main role; 74 episodes
2006	Cow Belles	Reed Callum	Television film
2006	Entourage	Bradley	Episode: "What About Bob?"
2009	Polar Storm	Dr. James Mayfield	Television film
2010	The Mentalist	Max Winter	Episode: "Red Carpet Treatment"
2010	House	Joe Dugan	Episode: "Office Politics"
2010–2013	The Office	State Senator Robert Lipton	14 episodes
2011	Rock the House	Max Peterson	Television film
2011	Criminal Minds	Bill Rogers	Episode: "Hope"
2011–2012	The Vampire Diaries	Bill Forbes	5 episodes
2012	Crash & Burn	Jack Coleman	Television film
2012–2014	Ultimate Spider-Man	Doctor Strange (voice)	3 episodes
2012–2015	Castle	Senator William H. Bracken	6 episodes
2013	Burn Notice	Andrew Strong	11 episodes
2013	Scandal	Daniel Douglas Langston	6 episodes
2014	Salvation	Daniel	Television film
2014	CSI: Crime Scene Investigation	Jim Logan	Episode: "Love For Sale"
2014	Hulk and the Agents of S.M.A.S.H.	Doctor Strange (voice)	Episode: "Stranger in a Strange Land"
2015	Heroes Reborn	Noah Bennet	TV miniseries
2015–2026	Chicago P.D.	"Disco Bob" Ruzek	8 episodes
2015	Avengers Assemble	Doctor Strange (voice)	Episode: "Widow's Run"
2017	Do I Say I Do?	Robert	Television film
2018	How to Get Away with Murder	Mr. Dean	Episode: "He's a Bad Father"
2018	Hawaii Five-O	Agent Miller	2 episodes
2021	Ordinary Joe	Dr. Douglas Banks	Recurring role
2022	Westworld	Senator Ken Whitney	Episode: "Well Enough Alone"
2025	Leverage: Redemption	Arizona Mike	Episode: "The Weekend in Paris Job"
