= Hugh Dane =

American actor (1942–2018)

- Born: October 21, 1942; Phoenix, Arizona, U.S.
- Died: May 16, 2018 (aged 75); Los Angeles, California, U.S.
- Occupation: Actor
- Years active: 1989–2018

Hugh Dane (October 21, 1942 – May 16, 2018) was an American character actor. He was best known for playing Hank the security guard on the television sitcom The Office from 2005 to 2013.

== Acting career ==
Dane's professional acting career began with a role in the 1989 video game, It Came from the Desert, before moving on to his first television role in a two-part episode of Hunter. In 1991, Dane acted in his first film role as a corrections officer in the crime-thriller Ricochet. In the following years, Dane played small roles in popular television series' such as The Fresh Prince of Bel-Air, Hangin' with Mr. Cooper, Boy Meets World, Martin, Friends, Sister, Sister, Monk and Girl Meets World.

Dane received the most recognition for his role as Hank, the head of security, in The Office. He also played the role of a judge in Netflix's Wet Hot American Summer: First Day of Camp.

In 1999, Dane returned to film, acting in such movies as Restraining Order, Joy Ride, Reflections: A Story of Redemption, Ralph & Stanley, Beautiful Dreamer, For Heaven's Sake, StarStruck, and Bridesmaids.

== Death ==
Dane died on May 16, 2018, at the age of 75 from pancreatic cancer.

== Filmography ==
=== Film ===
Year	Title	Role	Notes
1991	Ricochet	Corrections Officers	
1999	Restraining Order	D.A. Pringle	
2000	Black Sea Raid	CIA Director	
2000	The Visit	Mr. McDonald	
2001	Joy Ride	Man at Door	
2004	Reflections: A Story of Redemption	The Guardian	Short
2005	Ralph & Stanley	Willy	Short
2005	Girl on a Bed	Rondell	
2006	Beautiful Dreamer	Chester	
2008	For Heaven's Sake	Dr. Lowe	
2010	StarStruck	Howard	
2010	Little Fockers	Doctor	
2011	Bridesmaids	Annie's Mistaken Fella	
2019	Rumble Strip	Angus	(final film role)

=== Television ===
Year	Title	Role	Notes
1990	Hunter	The Father	2 episodes
1991–1992	The Fresh Prince of Bel-Air	Nelson / Fred Lomax Jr.	2 episodes
1993	Hangin' with Mr. Cooper	Xavier	Episode: "Piano Lesson"
1994	Boy Meets World	Coach	Episode: "The B-Team of Life"
1994	Martin	Elmo	Episode: "Love is in Your Face: Part 2"
1995	Friends	Jim	Episode: "The One With The Baby On The Bus"
1996	Sister, Sister	Walter	Episode: "Big Twin on Campus"
2002	The Steve Harvey Show	Silky	Episode: "My Fair Homegirl"
2003	The West Wing	Judge	Episode: "Jefferson Lives"
2004	Monk	Sgt. Lane	Episode: "Mr. Monk and the Missing Granny"
2005–2013	The Office	Hank, the Security Guard	22 episodes
2006	Everybody Hates Chris	Man Drinking	Episode: "Everybody Hates Jail"
2011	New Girl	Old Customer	Episode: "Bad in Bed"
2015	Girl Meets World	Phil	Episode: "Girl Meets Fish"
2015	Wet Hot American Summer: First Day of Camp	Judge	Episode: "Electro/City"
2017	Curb Your Enthusiasm	Bus Passenger	Episode: "Namaste"
