= Office Ladies =

Rewatch podcast

- Genre: Rewatch
- Language: English

Cast and voices
- Hosted by: Jenna Fischer; Angela Kinsey

Music
- Opening theme: "Rubber Tree" by Creed Bratton

Publication
- No. of episodes: 260, 51 Half Episodes
- Original release: October 16, 2019
- Provider: Audacy
- Updates: Weekly

Related
- Related shows: The Office
- Website: officeladies.com

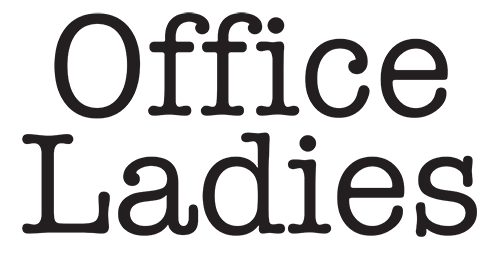
Office Ladies logo

Office Ladies is a rewatch podcast hosted by Jenna Fischer and Angela Kinsey which premiered on the Earwolf platform on October 16, 2019. It is also produced by Earwolf. In each episode, Fischer and Kinsey, who co-starred on the American television mockumentary sitcom The Office as Pam Beesly and Angela Martin respectively, discuss scene-by-scene each of the show's episodes and offer behind-the-scenes commentary as well responses to fan questions. They are sometimes joined by guests that include former co-stars, producers and writers. The podcast successfully covered every episode of The Office's nine-season run. The managing producer is Codi Fischer (no relation to Jenna) and Sam Kieffer is the show's audio engineer. The producer is Cassi Jerkins, and the associate producer is Aynsley Bubbico.

In May 2022, inspired by their podcast and friendship, Fischer and Kinsey released a book titled The Office BFFs: Tales of The Office from Two Best Friends Who Were There offering insight into their experiences while on The Office.

In August 2024, Office Ladies moved to the Audacy platform, just a few episodes until they completed the rewatch. After completing their rewatch of the entire series on October 30 of the same year, the podcast was rebranded as Office Ladies 6.0, (Note: In reference to Michael Scott describing Katy Moore (played by Amy Adams) as "Pam 6.0" in the episode "Hot Girl.") and focused on more specific deep dives, interviews, and character studies. In addition, they began rerunning their initial episodes (starting with "The Pilot" on November 5) under the name "Second Drink." (Note: In reference to something Pam says to Jim Halpert in "The Dundies.") In 2025, Fischer and Kinsey broke down episodes in the first season of The Office spin-off, The Paper, and conducted interviews with those cast members as well.

== List of episodes ==
No.	Original release date	Episode title	Featured guest(s)
1	October 16, 2019	"The Pilot"	
2	October 23, 2019	"Diversity Day"	
3	October 30, 2019	"Health Care"	Rainn Wilson
4	November 6, 2019	"The Alliance"	Philip D. Shea
5	November 13, 2019	"Basketball"	
6	November 20, 2019	"Hot Girl"	
7	December 4, 2019	"The Dundies"	
8	December 11, 2019	"Sexual Harassment"	
9	December 18, 2019	"Office Olympics"	Paul Feig
10	January 8, 2020	"The Fire"	
11	January 15, 2020	"Halloween"	Creed Bratton
12	January 22, 2020	"The Fight"	
13	January 29, 2020	"The Client"	Melora Hardin Catherine Zeta-Jones reads the summary of the episode.
14	February 5, 2020	"Performance Review"	Larry Wilmore
15	February 12, 2020	"Email Surveillance"	Ken Jeong, Joel McHale
16	February 19, 2020	"Christmas Party"	
17	February 26, 2020	"Booze Cruise"	Greg Daniels
18	March 4, 2020	"The Injury"	
19	March 11, 2020	"The Secret"	
20	March 18, 2020	"The Carpet"	
21	March 25, 2020	"Boys and Girls"	
22	April 1, 2020	"Valentine's Day"	Andy Buckley
23	April 8, 2020	"Dwight's Speech"	
24	April 15, 2020	"Take Your Daughter to Work Day"	
25	April 22, 2020	"Michael's Birthday"	
26	April 29, 2020	"Drug Testing"	
27	May 6, 2020	"Conflict Resolution"	
28	May 13, 2020	"Casino Night"	John Krasinski
29	May 20, 2020	"Gay Witch Hunt"	Oscar Nunez
30	May 27, 2020	"The Convention"	
31	June 10, 2020	"The Coup"	
32	June 17, 2020	"Grief Counseling"	Jennifer Celotta
33	June 24, 2020	"Initiation"	Rainn Wilson, B. J. Novak
34	July 1, 2020	"Diwali"	Mindy Kaling
35	July 8, 2020	"Branch Closing"	Charles Esten
36	July 15, 2020	"Casino Night Revisited"	Ken Kwapis
37	July 22, 2020	"The Merger"	
38	July 29, 2020	"The Convict"	Jeffrey Blitz, Wayne Wilderson
39	August 5, 2020	"A Benihana Christmas"	Rashida Jones, Jennifer Celotta
40	August 12, 2020	"Back from Vacation"	
41	August 19, 2020	"Traveling Salesmen"	
42	August 26, 2020	"The Return"	Ed Helms
43	September 2, 2020	"Ben Franklin"	Andy Daly
44	September 9, 2020	"Phyllis' Wedding"	Ken Whittingham, Phyllis Smith
45	September 16, 2020	"Revisited: First half of Season 3"	Dave Rogers
46	September 23, 2020	"Business School"	
47	September 30, 2020	"Cocktails"	
48	October 7, 2020	"The Negotiation"	David Denman
49	October 14, 2020	"Safety Training"	
50	October 21, 2020	"Product Recall"	
51	October 28, 2020	"Women's Appreciation"	
52	November 4, 2020	"Beach Games"	
53	November 11, 2020	"The Job Part 1"	Paul Lieberstein
54	November 18, 2020	"The Job Part 2"	
55	November 25, 2020	"Revisited: Season 1"	
56	December 2, 2020	"Fun Run Part 1"	Kate Flannery
57	December 9, 2020	"Fun Run Part 2"	
58	December 16, 2020	"Dunder Mifflin Infinity Part 1"	
59	January 6, 2021	"Dunder Mifflin Infinity Part 2"	
60	January 13, 2021	"Launch Party Part 1"	
61	January 20, 2021	"Launch Party Part 2"	Kevin McHale
62	January 27, 2021	"Money Part 1"	
63	February 2, 2021	"Money Part 2"	
64	February 10, 2021	"Revisited: Second half of Season 3"	Randall Einhorn, Jackie Debatin
65	February 17, 2021	"Local Ad"	
66	February 24, 2021	"Branch Wars"	
67	March 3, 2021	"Survivor Man"	
68	March 10, 2021	"The Deposition"	
69	March 17, 2021	"Dinner Party"	Steve Carell, John Krasinski, Melora Hardin, Rainn Wilson, Ed Helms, Beth Grant, Paul Feig
69.5	March 24, 2021	"Happy Spring Break and A Look Back on Booze Cruise"	Greg Daniels
70	March 31, 2021	"Chair Model"	
71	April 7, 2021	"Night Out"	Kate Flannery, Noel Petok
72	April 14, 2021	"Did I Stutter?"	
73	April 21, 2021	"Job Fair"	
74	April 28, 2021	"Goodbye Toby Part 1"	
74.5	May 3, 2021	"Bonus Episode: Monday Motivation"	
75	May 5, 2021	"Goodbye Toby Part 2"	Jordan Duffy, Joshua Snyder
75.5	May 12, 2021	"A Look Back at Grief Counseling"	Jennifer Celotta
76	May 19, 2021	"Weight Loss Part 1"	
77	May 26, 2021	"Weight Loss Part 2"	
78	June 2, 2021	"Business Ethics"	Amy Ryan
79	June 9, 2021	"Baby Shower"	
80	June 16, 2021	"Revisited: Season 4"	Carey Bennett
81	June 23, 2021	"Crime Aid"	
82	June 30, 2021	"Employee Transfer"	
83	July 7, 2021	"Customer Survey"	Stephen Merchant
84	July 14, 2021	"Business Trip"	Rich Sommer
85	July 21, 2021	"Frame Toby"	
85.5	July 28, 2021	"A Look Back at Branch Closing"	Charles Esten
86	August 4, 2021	"The Surplus"	
87	August 11, 2021	"Moroccan Christmas"	
88	August 18, 2021	"The Duel"	
88.5	August 25, 2021	"A Look Back at Conflict Resolution"	
89	September 1, 2021	"Prince Family Paper"	
90	September 8, 2021	"Stress Relief Part 1"	
91	September 15, 2021	"Stress Relief Part 2"	
92	September 22, 2021	"Lecture Circuit Part 1"	
93	September 29, 2021	"Lecture Circuit Part 2"	
94	October 6, 2021	"Blood Drive"	
95	October 13, 2021	"Golden Ticket"	Rainn Wilson
96	October 20, 2021	"New Boss"	
97	October 27, 2021	"Two Weeks"	
98	November 3, 2021	"Dream Team"	
99	November 10, 2021	"Michael Scott Paper Company"	
100	November 17, 2021	"Heavy Competition"	
100.5	November 24, 2021	"A Look Back at Diwali"	
101	December 1, 2021	"Broke"	
102	December 8, 2021	"Casual Friday"	Brian Baumgartner
103	December 15, 2021	"Cafe Disco"	
103.5	December 22, 2021	"Happy Holidays and A Look Back at Christmas Party"	
103.9	December 29, 2021	"Happy New Year and A Look Back at Traveling Salesmen"	
104	January 5, 2022	"Company Picnic"	
105	January 12, 2022	"Gossip"	
106	January 19, 2022	"The Meeting"	
107	January 26, 2022	Interview with Mike Schur	Mike Schur
108	February 2, 2022	"The Promotion"	
109	February 9, 2022	"Niagara Part 1"	Greg Daniels, Anna Camp
110	February 16, 2022	"Niagara Part 2"	
111	February 23, 2022	"Mafia"	
112	March 2, 2022	"The Lover"	
113	March 9, 2022	"Koi Pond"	
114	March 16, 2022	"Double Date"	
115	March 23, 2022	"Murder"	
115.5	March 30, 2021	"Happy Spring Break and A Look Back at Chair Model"	
116	April 6, 2022	"Shareholder Meeting"	
117	April 13, 2022	"Scott's Tots"	B. J. Novak
118	April 20, 2022	"Secret Santa"	Billie Joe Armstrong reads the summary for the episode.
119	April 27, 2022	"The Banker"	
120	May 4, 2022	"Sabre"	
121	May 11, 2022	"The Manager and the Salesman"	
121.5	May 13, 2022	"Chapter 1 from The Office BFFs Audiobook"	
122	May 18, 2022	"The Office BFFs Book Q&A"	
123	May 25, 2022	"The Delivery Part 1"	
124	June 1, 2022	"The Delivery Part 2"	
125	June 8, 2022	"St. Patrick's Day"	
126	June 15, 2022	"New Leads"	
127	June 20, 2022	"Happy Hour"	
128	July 13, 2022	"Secretary's Day"	Ellie Kemper
129	July 20, 2022	"Body Language"	
130	July 27, 2022	"The Cover-Up"	
131	August 3, 2022	"The Chump"	
132	August 10, 2022	"Whistleblower"	
133	August 17, 2022	"Nepotism"	
133.5	August 24, 2022	"A Look Back at Beach Games"	
134	August 31, 2022	"Counseling"	
135	September 7, 2022	"Andy's Play"	Ed Helms
136	September 14, 2022	"Sex Ed"	Nancy Carell
137	September 21, 2022	"The Sting"	Craig Robinson
138	September 28, 2022	"Costume Contest"	
139	October 5, 2022	"Christening"	
140	October 12, 2022	"Viewing Party"	
141	October 19, 2022	"WUPHF.com"	Aaron Shure
142	October 26, 2022	"China"	
143	November 2, 2022	"Classy Christmas, Part 1"	
144	November 9, 2022	"Classy Christmas Part 2"	
145	November 16, 2022	"Ultimatum"	
145.5	November 23, 2022	"A Look Back at Company Picnic"	
146	November 30, 2022	"The Seminar"	
147	December 7, 2022	"The Search"	
148	December 14, 2022	"PDA"	Greg Daniels
149	December 21, 2022	"Holiday Mailbag"	
149.5	December 28, 2022	"A Look Back at Casino Night"	John Krasinski
150	January 5, 2023	"A Conversation with Billie Eilish"	Billie Eilish
151	January 11, 2023	"Threat Level Midnight"	B. J. Novak
152	January 18, 2023	"Todd Packer"	
153	January 25, 2023	"Garage Sale"	
154	February 1, 2023	"Training Day"	
155	February 8, 2023	"Michael's Last Dundies"	
155.5	February 15, 2023	"A Look Back at Frame Toby"	
156	February 22, 2023	"Goodbye, Michael, Part 1"	Greg Daniels
157	March 1, 2023	"Goodbye, Michael, Part 2"	Greg Daniels
158	March 8, 2023	"Interview With Steve Carell"	Steve Carell
159	March 15, 2023	"The Inner Circle"	
160	March 22, 2023	"An Interview With Will Ferrell"	Will Ferrell
160.5	March 29, 2023	"A Look Back on Hot Girl"	
160.9	April 5, 2023	"A Look Back on Heavy Competition"	
161	April 12, 2023	"Dwight K. Schrute, (Acting) Manager"	
162	April 19, 2023	"Search Committee Part 1"	
163	April 26, 2023	"Search Committee Part 2"	Rainn Wilson
163.5	May 3, 2023	"Movie Breakdown: Speed"	
163.9	May 5, 2023	"An Interview With Beth Grant"	Beth Grant
164	May 10, 2023	"The List"	
165	May 17, 2023	"The Incentive"	
166	May 24, 2023	"Lotto"	Mark Proksch
167	May 31, 2023	"Garden Party"	Josh Groban
168	June 7, 2023	"Spooked"	
168.5	June 14, 2023	"A Look Back on Fun Run Part 1"	Kate Flannery
168.9	June 21, 2023	"A Look Back on Koi Pond"	
169	June 8, 2023	"Doomsday"	
170	July 5, 2023	"Pam's Replacement"	
171	July 12, 2023	"Gettysburg"	
172	July 20, 2023	"Mrs. California"	
173	July 26, 2023	"Christmas Wishes"	Ameenah Kaplan
174	August 2, 2023	"Trivia"	
174.5	August 9, 2023	"A Look Back at The Carpet"	
174.9	August 16, 2023	"A Look Back on Michael's Birthday"	
175	August 23, 2023	"Pool Party"	
176	August 30, 2023	"Jury Duty"	
177	September 6, 2023	"Special Project"	
178	September 13, 2023	"Tallahassee"	
178.5	September 20, 2023	"A Look Back at Double Date"	
179	September 27, 2023	"After Hours"	
181	October 11, 2023	"Dear Office Ladies"	
182	October 18, 2023	"Last Day in Florida"	
183	October 25, 2023	"Get the Girl"	
184	November 1, 2023	"Welcome Party"	
185	November 8, 2023	"Angry Andy"	Claire Scanlon
186	November 15, 2023	"Fundraiser"	
186.5	November 22, 2023	"A look back at Sabre"	
187	November 29, 2023	"An interview with Zach Woods"	Zach Woods
188	December 6, 2023	"Turf War"	
188.5	December 11, 2023	"Office Ladies Live: Fan Mailbag"	
189	December 13, 2023	"Free Family Portrait Studio"	
189.5	December 20, 2023	"A look back at Secret Santa"	
189.9	December 29, 2023	"A look back at Christening"	
190	January 3, 2024	"New Guys"	
191	January 10, 2024	"Roy's Wedding"	Tim Meadows
192	January 17, 2024	"Andy's Ancestry"	
193	January 24, 2024	"Work Bus"	
193.5	January 17, 2024	"Office Ladies Announcement!"	
194	January 31, 2024	"An Interview With Bryan Cranston"	Bryan Cranston
194.5	February 5, 2024	"Monday Motivation With Kendra Adachi"	Kendra Adachi
195	February 7, 2024	"Here Comes Treble"	
195.5	February 14, 2024	"A Look Back on Valentine's Day"	
196	February 21, 2024	"The Boat"	
197	February 28, 2024	"The Whale"	
198	March 6, 2024	"An Interview With Kelly Cantley"	Kelly Cantley
199	March 13, 2024	"The Target"	
200	March 20, 2024	"Dwight's Christmas"	Sam Kieffer
200.5	March 27, 2024	"A Look Back on Murder"	
200.9	April 3, 2024	"A Look Back on Scott's Tots"	B. J. Novak
201	April 10, 2024	"Lice"	
202	April 17, 2024	"Suit Warehouse"	
203	April 24, 2024	"Customer Loyalty"	
204	May 1, 2024	"Junior Salesman"	
204.5	May 8, 2024	"A Look Back on Nepotism"	
205	May 15, 2024	"An Interview With John Krasinski"	John Krasinski
206	May 22, 2024	"Vandalism"	Lee Kirk
207	May 29, 2024	"Couples Discount"	
208	June 5, 2024	"An Interview with Jake Lacy"	Jake Lacy
208.5	June 12, 2024	"A look back on Counseling"	
209	June 19, 2024	"An Interview with Phyllis Smith"	Phyllis Smith
210	June 26, 2024	"Moving On Part 1"	
211	July 3, 2024	"Moving On Part 2"	
212	July 10, 2024	"An Interview with Bob Odenkirk"	
212.1	July 17, 2024	"A look back on Weight Loss Part 1"	
212.2	July 24, 2024	"A look back on Weight Loss Part 2"	
212.5	July 31, 2024	"A look back on Business Ethics"	Amy Ryan
212.9	August 7, 2024	"A look back on Baby Shower"	
213	August 14, 2024	"The Farm"	
214	August 21, 2024	"Promos"	
215	August 28, 2024	"Stairmageddon"	Leslie David Baker
216	September 4, 2024	"Paper Airplane"	
217	September 11, 2024	"An Interview with Catherine Tate"	Catherine Tate
218	September 18, 2024	"Livin' the Dream, Pt 1, with Michael Imperioli"	Michael Imperioli
219	September 25, 2024	"Livin' the Dream, Pt 2"	
219.5	October 1, 2024	"Office Ladies News, The Plan & Dragons"	
220	October 9, 2024	"Jenna's News & A.A.R.M. Pt 1"	
221	October 16, 2024	"A.A.R.M. Pt 2"	
222	October 23, 2024	"Finale Pt 1"	
223	October 30, 2024	"Finale Pt 2"	
224	November 6, 2024	"An Interview with Allison Jones"	Allison Jones
225	November 13, 2024	"All About Michael Scott"	
226	November 20, 2024	"Webisodes: The Accountants"	
227	December 4, 2024	"Star Wars Holiday Special"	
228	December 11, 2024	"An Interview with Kathy Bates"	Kathy Bates
228.3	December 13, 2024	"Bonus Christmas Episode with Brian Baumgartner"	Brian Baumgartner
229	December 18, 2024	"Superfan Episode: Hot Girl"	
230	January 8, 2025	"Is Toby the Scranton Strangler? With Paul Lieberstein"	Paul Lieberstein
231	January 15, 2025	"An Interview with Dave Rogers"	Dave Rogers
232	January 22, 2025	"An Interview with Timothy Olyphant"	Timothy Olyphant
233	January 29, 2025	"All About Kevin Malone"	
234	February 5, 2025	"Webisode: Subtle Sexuality"	
235	February 12, 2025	"The Edge Pt 1"	
236	February 19, 2025	"The Edge Pt 2"	
236.5	February 26, 2025	"Office Ladies Announcement & Lazy Genius' It's a New Year... Let's Name What's Working"	
237	March 5, 2025	"All About Pam Beesly"	
238	March 12, 2025	"Peacock Superfan: The Fire"	
239	March 19, 2025	"An Interview with Clark Duke"	Clark Duke
239.3	March 21, 2025	"Friday Chit Chat 1"	
240	March 26, 2025	"20th Anniversary of The Office with Greg Daniels"	Greg Daniels
241	April 9, 2025	"Mailbag & Fan Theories"	
241.3	April 11, 2025	"Friday Chit Chat 2"	
242	April 16, 2025	"Webisodes: The Podcast & The Office Ladies Podcast Pilot"	
243	April 23, 2025	"All About Stanley Hudson"	
244	April 29, 2025	"An Interview with Lindsey Broad"	Lindsey Broad
244.3	May 1, 2025	"Friday Chit Chat 3"	
245	May 6, 2025	"Dinner Party Horror Stories"	
246	May 13, 2025	"Webisode: The Mentor"	
247	May 20, 2025	"Peacock Superfan: Boys and Girls with Director Dennie Gordon	Dennie Gordon
248	May 27, 2025	"An Interview with Gene Stupnitsky and Lee Eisenberg"	Gene Stupnitsky and Lee Eisenberg
249	June 4, 2025	"Best Friends Day"	
249.3	June 6, 2025	"Friday Chit Chat 4"	
250	June 11, 2025	"Office Ladies Meet Pod Meets World"	Danielle Fishel, Will Friedle, Rider Strong
251	June 18, 2025	"Finer Things Club"	
252	June 25, 2025	"All About Angela Martin"	
252.7	July 2, 2025	"A Look Back on An Interview with Michael Schur"	Michael Schur
253	July 9, 2025	"An Interview with Tony Hawk"	Tony Hawk
253.3	July 11, 2025	"Friday Chit Chat 5 with Colin Anderson"	Colin Anderson
254	July 16, 2025	"The BBC Pilot with Lucy Davis"	Lucy Davis
255	July 23, 2025	"Office Ladies Do Game of Thrones"	
256	July 30, 2025	"An Interview with Leanne Morgan"	Leanne Morgan
256.5	August 6, 2025	"A Look Back on a Conversation with Billie Eilish"	Billie Eilish
256.7	August 8, 2025	"The Paper Interviews #1 with Domhnall Gleeson"	Domhnall Gleeson
257	August 13, 2025	"Webisode: The Third Floor"	
257.7	August 15, 2025	"The Paper Interviews #2 with Chelsea Frei"	Chelsea Frei
258	August 20, 2025	"Fly on the Wall with Jenna Fischer"	
258.7	August 22, 2025	"The Paper Interviews #3 with Sabrina Impacciatore"	Sabrina Impacciatore
259	August 27, 2025	"An Interview with Wendi McLendon-Covey"	Wendi McLendon-Covey
259.7	August 28, 2025	"The Paper Interviews #4 with Ramona Young & Gbemisola Ikumelo"	Ramona Young and Gbemisola Ikumelo
260	September 2, 2025	"All About Phyllis Lapin"	
261	September 10, 2025	"'The Paper' Pilot"	Greg Daniels, Michael Koman
261.7	September 17, 2025	"A Look Back on An Interview with Zach Woods"	Zach Woods
262	September 24, 2025	"All About Creed Bratton"	Creed Bratton
262.3	September 26, 2025	"Friday Chit Chat 6"	
263	October 1, 2025	"The Golden Girls Deep Dive Podcast with Jenna Fischer and Angela Kinsey"	Patrick Hinds, Jennifer Simard
264	October 8, 2025	"Michael's Improv Class With Michael Naughton"	Michael Naughton, Marcus Folmar, Conner McCabe
265	October 15, 2025	"Office Meet Cutes"	
265.5	October 17, 2025	"Friday Chit Chat 7"	
266	October 22, 2025	"Office Food"	
267	October 29, 2025	"Office Ladies do The Matrix"	
268	November 5, 2025	"An Interview with Tig Notaro"	Tig Notaro
269	November 12, 2025	"How We Met the Office Ladies"	
270	November 19, 2025	"Peacock Superfan: Customer Survey"	
270.7	November 26, 2025	"A Look Back on An Interview With Bryan Cranston"	Bryan Cranston
271	December 3, 2025	"Fan Convention & Stage Door"	
272	December 10, 2025	"An Interview With Teri Weinberg"	Teri Weinberg
272.3	December 12, 2025	"A Look Back on the Star Wars Holiday Special"	
273	December 17, 2025	"Peacock Superfan: Basketball with Karly Rothenberg"	Karly Rothenberg
273.1	December 19, 2025	"Holiday Chit Chat With Kate Flannery"	Kate Flannery
273.5	December 23, 2025	"A Look Back on Christmas Party"	
273.8	December 31, 2025	"A Look Back on The Paper Pilot"	Greg Daniels, Michael Koman
274	January 7, 2026	"The Paper Ep 2: The Five W's"	
275	January 14, 2026	"The Paper Ep 3: Buddy and the Dude"	Mary Hollis Inboden, Creed Bratton
275.3	January 16, 2026	"Friday Chit Chat 8"	
276	January 21, 2026	"The Paper Ep 4: TTT vs the Blogger"	
277	January 28, 2026	"The Paper Ep 5: Scam Alert!"	
277.3	January 30, 2026	"Friday Chit Chat: Kid Snacks & John Wick Receipts"	
278	February 4, 2026	"SNAFU with Ed Helms"	Ed Helms
279	February 11, 2026	"The Paper Ep 6: Churnalism"	
280	February 18, 2026	"The Paper Ep 7: I Love You"	
281	February 25, 2026	"The Paper Ep 8: Church and State"	
281.3	February 27, 2026	"Friday Chit Chat with Rainn Wilson"	Rainn Wilson
282	March 4, 2026	"The Paper Ep 9: Matching Ponchos"	
283	March 11, 2026	"The Paper Ep 10: The Ohio Journalism Awards with Chelsea Frei"	Chelsea Frei
284	March 18, 2026	"Office News & Blackmail"	
285	March 25, 2026	"Actor Awards & Jenna's Birthday"	
285.3	March 27, 2026	"Friday Chit Chat with Kendra Adachi"	Kendra Adachi
286	April 1, 2026	"A Look Back on An Interview with Steve Carrell"	Steve Carrell
287	April 8, 2026	"Two Truths & A Lie with Joel McHale"	Joel McHale
288	April 15, 2026	"The Office & HIMYM: Favorite Cold Opens"	Josh Radnor, Craig Thomas
289	April 22, 2026	"Office Ladies Do: Grease 2!"	
289.3	April 29, 2026	"Bonus: Mother's Day Tributes"	
290	April 29, 2026	"All About Jan Levinson (Gould) with Melora Hardin"	Melora Hardin
291	May 5, 2026	"Travel Journals"	
292	May 13, 2026	"Billie Eilish vs Office Trivia"	Billie Eilish, Jack Metzger

== Animated series ==
On August 12, 2021, Fischer and Kinsey premiered the Office Ladies Animated Series on Comedy Central's YouTube channel. The series was a co-production with the animation studio Cartuna who used audio from the podcast to create animated reenactments from each episode. It ran for a total of 10 episodes.

Episode Number	Original Release Date	Episode Title
101	August 12, 2021	Hot Girl
102	August 12, 2021	Sexual Harassment
103	August 19, 2021	Health Care
104	August 26, 2021	The Dundies
105	September 2, 2021	The Fire
106	September 9, 2021	Performance Review
107	September 16, 2021	Christmas Party
108	September 23, 2021	The Injury
109	September 30, 2021	Dwight's Speech
110	September 30, 2021	Conflict Resolution

== Awards ==
Year	Association	Category	Nominee(s)	Result	Ref.
2019	Discover Pods Awards	Best TV and Movie's Podcast	Office Ladies	Won	
2020	Shorty Awards	Best Podcaster	Jenna Fischer and Angela Kinsey	Nominated	
2021	iHeartRadio Podcast Awards	Best Comedy Podcast	Office Ladies	Nominated	
2021	iHeartRadio Podcast Awards	Best Ad Read Podcast	Office Ladies	Won	
2021	iHeartRadio Podcast Awards	Podcast of the Year	Office Ladies	Won	
2021	Webby Awards	Best Television & Film Podcast	Office Ladies	Nominated	
2021	Ambies	Best Entertainment Podcast	Office Ladies	Nominated	
2022	iHeartRadio Podcast Awards	Best Television & Film Podcast	Office Ladies	Nominated	
2023	iHeartRadio Podcast Awards	Best Ad Read Podcast	Office Ladies	Nominated	
2025	Webby Awards	Best Co-Hosts	Jenna Fischer and Angela Kinsey	Honored	

== See also ==
- List of film and television podcasts

== Notes ==
1. In reference to Michael Scott describing Katy Moore (played by Amy Adams) as "Pam 6.0" in the episode "Hot Girl."
2. In reference to something Pam says to Jim Halpert in "The Dundies."
