= The Job (The Office) =

- The Office episodes
- Episode nos.: Season 3 Episodes 24 & 25
- Directed by: Ken Kwapis
- Written by: Paul Lieberstein; Michael Schur
- Cinematography by: Randall Einhorn
- Editing by: David Rogers; Dean Holland
- Production code: 323/324
- Original air date: May 17, 2007
- Running time: 42 minutes

Guest appearances
- Creed Bratton as Creed Bratton; Rashida Jones as Karen Filippelli; Andy Buckley as David Wallace; Nicholas D'Agosto as Hunter

Episode chronology
← Previous "Beach Games"	Next → "Fun Run"
- The Office (American season 3)

"The Job" is the third season finale of the American version of The Office and the show's 52nd and 53rd episodes overall. In this episode, Michael prepares for his interview for the corporate job and names Dwight as his successor, whose managing methods are unpopular. Jan arrives at the office to see Michael and everyone is shocked when it appears she has undergone breast augmentation. Jim and Karen also interview for the corporate position, and Pam deals with the consequences of her earlier outburst.

The episode was written by Paul Lieberstein and Michael Schur, and was directed by Ken Kwapis. It was cut down from an hour and twelve minutes to forty-two minutes, making it the season's second hour-long episode after "A Benihana Christmas". Kwapis carefully shot Jim's reaction shots, as he did not want to reveal Jim's choice of Karen or Pam to the audience. The cast were unaware how the season would end, as multiple endings were shot by the crew. Filming wrapped up in April 2007.

The finale first aired in the United States on May 17, 2007 on NBC. An estimated 7.9 million viewers watched the episode; it earned a 3.9/12 ratings share among adults 18–49, making it rank first for the night. Television critics gave positive reviews to the finale, with many finding the ending scene between Jim and Pam satisfying. It won the Writers Guild of America Award for Best Screenplay – Episodic Comedy and the Primetime Emmy Award for Outstanding Single-Camera Picture Editing for a Comedy Series. In addition, Jenna Fischer received a nomination for Primetime Emmy Award for Outstanding Supporting Actress in a Comedy Series.

== Plot ==
Confident that he will get the corporate job in New York City, Michael Scott sells his condo and names Dwight Schrute his successor as Regional Manager. Pam Beesly cheerfully withstands her colleagues' teasing over her speech from "Beach Games", and tells Karen Filippelli that she is not sorry about what she said but regrets putting Karen in an awkward position. Kevin Malone asks Jim Halpert whom he finds more attractive between Karen and Pam. Jim declines to answer, feigning interest in Kevin's reasoning.

Jan Levinson arrives at the office to win Michael back. In a panic, Michael consults the women of the office. Pam tells him not to reconcile with Jan. Michael agrees, but reverses course when he sees that she has had a breast augmentation. Jim and Karen drive to New York City together and spend the night before their interviews. Karen tells Jim that if either of them gets the job, both should move to New York. She promises to do so, but is met with awkward silence when she asks Jim to reciprocate. Dwight begins his regime, assigning Andy Bernard the role of his number two (albeit because he is the only one to apply) and asking Pam to be his secret "Assistant to the Regional Manager". Dwight's motivational style, predicated on awarding "Schrute Bucks" redeemable for rewards like several extra minutes for lunch, is unpopular. He and Andy repaint the walls of Dwight's new office black in order to instill intimidation.

At Corporate, Michael learns from CFO David Wallace that he is interviewing for the job currently held by Jan, who will be fired. Michael goes to Jan's office after the interview and bumbles into revealing her impending termination. Jan storms into Wallace's office, interrupting Karen's interview, and refuses to leave. After Jan is escorted out by security, Wallace tells Michael that he will not be getting the position. Michael endorses both Karen and Jim for the job. On the drive back to Scranton, Jan tells Michael that she will make their relationship her "full-time job" and that the painkillers she has had to take following the breast augmentation give her violent mood swings, both of which make Michael uncomfortable.

Jim's interview with Wallace goes well until he discovers an encouraging note from Pam along with a yogurt lid medal (from the episode "Office Olympics"), throwing him off. Jim recalls a conversation with Pam after her confession on the beach. He discreetly admits that he left Scranton because of her rejection and that he feels that he has "never really come back," meaning that he has been actively fighting his feelings for her. Pam tells him that she wishes that he would come back.

Pam tells the cameras that she accepts that it would not work out between her and Jim. He bursts into the room and asks her out to dinner. Stunned, she agrees.

Wallace offers the job to Ryan Howard, who accepts and immediately breaks up with Kelly Kapoor.

== Production ==
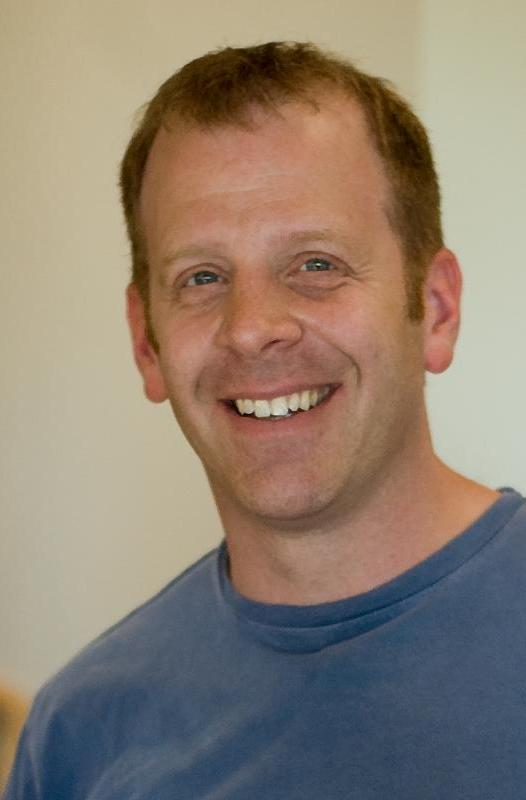
"The Job" was co-written by Paul Lieberstein, who plays Toby Flenderson on the series.

"The Job" was written by Paul Lieberstein and Michael Schur. It was directed by Ken Kwapis, who had, around the same time, directed The Office actors John Krasinski, Brian Baumgartner, Mindy Kaling, and Angela Kinsey in the 2007 film License to Wed. Script reading for the episode took place on a beach during the filming of the season's twenty-third episode, "Beach Games". Actress Kate Flannery remarked that "we were so excited that we almost had another hot dog eating contest. Not. It's a great script. Lots of questions answered. Lots. The Office fans have been anxiously awaiting a one-hour episode, and guess what? You got it." The original cut of the episode was an hour and twelve minutes long, and had to be edited down to forty-two minutes of screentime. It was the second Office episode to fill the entire hour timeslot; the first was the third-season episode "A Benihana Christmas".

Krasinski received a haircut due to production on another film, Leatherheads (2008), which he thought "ended up working perfectly" for the season finale. Co-creator Greg Daniels had wanted Jim to get a haircut for a while, as he thought it would "change [him] up a little bit." Krasinski thought it was "really smart" to make it seem like Karen's idea. Kwapis was careful with Jim's reaction shots in the episode, as he did not want to "tip anything" to the audience about Jim's choice of Karen or Pam. Kwapis explained, "That to me was actually one of the big challenges of the episode, is how to keep you on your toes in terms of not knowing where that story was going." Jim's scene with Pam on the beach was filmed during production of the previous episode, "Beach Games", and was initially intended to be the cold open of "The Job" before Michael Schur suggested it be moved. Kwapis shot multiple endings, and the cast was unaware how the season would end.

Jenna Fischer enjoyed doing her individual scenes with Rainn Wilson because their characters rarely interacted one-on-one. The filming of these scenes took place on the last days of production for the season, and not many people were still on set. The episode finished shooting in April 2007. Two weeks before the finale, actor Oscar Nunez gave brief allusions in an interview with Entertainment Weekly, "There will be some movement. Major things moving. Major shifts that affect the entire office. So there's some good stuff coming up. That's all I can say."

== Reception ==
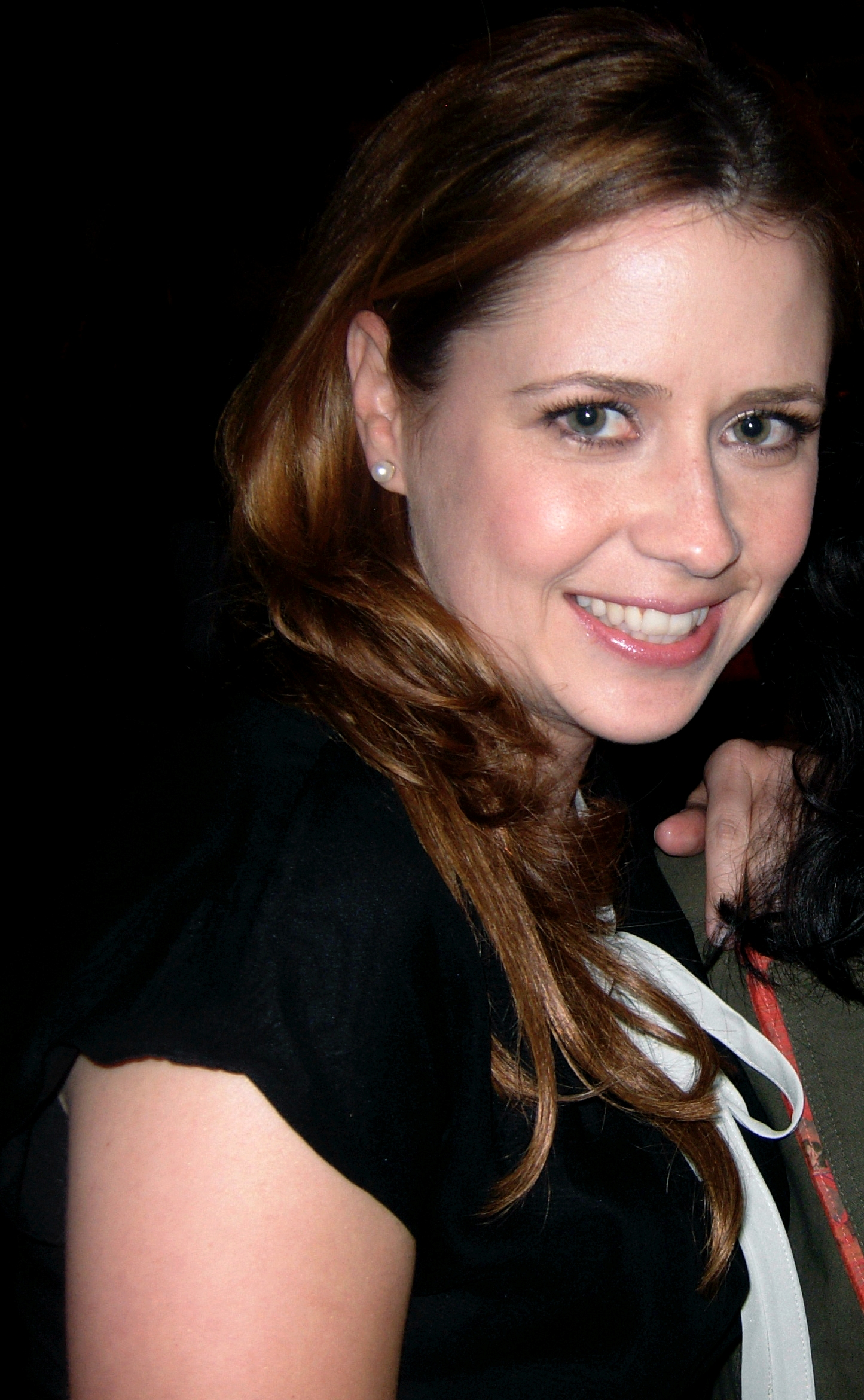
IGN opined that Pam's "reaction when Jim asks her to dinner is as honest and believable as any moment on television and reminds us why we care so much about this relationship."

The episode first aired in the United States on May 17, 2007, several days after NBC announced a fourth season. "The Job" attracted 7.9 million viewers and earned a 3.9/12 ratings share among adults 18 to 49. It ranked first for the night in that demographic, and was NBC's highest among adults and total viewers in its timeslot since the broadcast of "Cocktails". Among total viewers, The Office ranked third in its timeslot (behind a CBS tribute to the retiring Bob Barker and ABC's first season finale of Ugly Betty).

The season finale received generally positive reviews from television critics. Entertainment Weekly columnist Abby West wrote that it "was hands down one of the most satisfying hours of television I have ever had the pleasure of watching," explaining that it created "entirely new dynamics" for the fourth season, hit "all major beats," and had "real story progression" and heart. Give Me My Remote writer Kath Skerry declared that the episode was "brilliantly written, acted, and well paced. It was filled with twists and turns that I didn’t see coming. And I know that it sounds cliche, and I know saying it sounds cliche, sounds cliche. Maybe I’m being cliche but I don’t care. I am what I am – a full fledged Office addict who got exactly what she wanted, and in fact needed from the finale." James Poniewozik of Time magazine voiced similar sentiments, believing the finale to be a "good if not great season-ender, and if the conclusion didn't have the holy-crap factor of The Kiss last year, Pam's closeup reaction to Jim's return during her interview was—like everything Jenna Fischer does on this show—winning and sweet." Poniewozik disliked how the season left Karen, calling it "an uncharacteristic way to end this love triangle, which was distinguished by the writers' refusal to make anyone the bad guy."

The best thing about the season-long Jam saga was that the writers, with Fischer's able help, made it about more than the receptionist's lonely pining for some guy. Ultimately—and this was beautifully set up, going back to Pam's art show and before—it was about Pam missing herself, needing to become confident, brave and self-sufficient. She was delighted when Jim came back to her, but the nice thing is (and this is something the British Office never managed with melancholy Dawn) she had already found happiness unto herself.

— James Poniewozik, Time magazine

IGN's Travis Fickett rated "The Job" 8.2/10. He believed that the episode "pulled off some rather brilliant turns" with the storylines concerning Jan and Jim, Karen, and Pam; additionally noting that the episode was at its weakest during Dwight's take-over scenes in Scranton since he knew Michael would be returning and that Ryan's selection "makes for some interesting scenarios for next season." AOL TV contributor Jay Black highlighted scenes he found humorous, including Dwight's preferred choice of an assistant and Michael's reaction to Jan's implants. He gave the episode "7 Shrute Bucks out of 7." Various cast members were also lauded for their performances, including Jenna Fischer, John Krasinski, and Melora Hardin.

In an article written after the episode's broadcast, actress Kate Flannery observed that "lots of questions" were answered and that it was "like a movie". Referring to the agreed-to date between Jim and Pam, Flannery said, "The point is that the elephant in the room has not only been addressed but asked to dinner. Makes Season 4 seem filled with possibilities – like an empty glass in front of a full bar." In an article written around the time of actor Steve Carell's last performance on The Office in 2011, IGN's Cindy White listed Michael's quote about Jan's "breast enhancement" as among the best of the series. Dan Philipps, another writer for IGN, ranked Jim's date proposal among the best moments for the couple, stating that "after toying with fans' expectations for two whole seasons, the series' writers finally allowed fans to breathe a sigh of relief. For many, the moment was well worth the wait."

For their writing of "The Job", Paul Lieberstein and Michael Schur won the Writers Guild of America Award for Best Screenplay – Episodic Comedy, beating The Office episodes "Local Ad" and "Phyllis' Wedding" as well as episodes of 30 Rock, Flight of the Conchords, and Pushing Daisies. At the 59th Creative Arts Emmy Awards, editors David Rogers and Dean Holland won for Outstanding Single-Camera Picture Editing for a Comedy Series. For her work in "The Job", Jenna Fischer received a nomination for Outstanding Supporting Actress in a Comedy Series, but lost to Jaime Pressly for her performance in My Name is Earl.
