= The Delivery (The Office) =

- The Office episodes
- Episode nos.: Season 6 Episodes 17/18
- Directed by: Seth Gordon (Part 1); Harold Ramis (Part 2)
- Written by: Daniel Chun (Part 1); Charlie Grandy (Part 2)
- Cinematography by: Randall Einhorn (Part 1); Matt Sohn (Part 2)
- Editing by: Claire Scanlon (Part 1); David Rogers (Part 2)
- Production code: 618/619
- Original air date: March 4, 2010
- Running time: 44 minutes

Guest appearances
- Part 1: Nelson Franklin as Nick; Part 2: Linda Purl as Helene Beesly; Sarah Baker as Josie; Kelen Coleman as Isabel Poreba; Evan Gaustad as Dale; Melissa Rauch as Kathy Duke; James Urbaniak as Rolf Ahl

Episode chronology
← Previous "The Manager and the Salesman"	Next → "St. Patrick's Day"
- The Office (American season 6)

"The Delivery" is a two-part episode of the sixth season of the American comedy series The Office. The episode aired on NBC on March 4, 2010. Since it is an hour-long episode, it is considered to be the 17th and 18th episodes in the season's episode count. It is the 117th and 118th episode overall.

In this episode, Pam starts having contractions but insists on waiting until midnight to go to the hospital in order to get an extra night at the hospital, irritating Jim. The office tries to distract her with food and entertainment. She eventually goes to the hospital and gives birth to a daughter, Cecelia Marie Halpert. Meanwhile, Michael, inspired by the success of Pam and Jim's relationship, sets up Erin with Kevin. Dwight, sent over to find Pam's iPod, discovers mold in Pam and Jim's house and remodels their entire kitchen, and also considers entering a pre-natal contract with ex-girlfriend Angela, for he feels he needs a baby for business reasons.

Part one is written by Daniel Chun and directed by Seth Gordon, while part two is written by Charlie Grandy and directed by Harold Ramis. The episode received mixed reviews from critics and came first in its time slot, helping NBC be the third highest-rated network of the night.

== Plot ==
Pam Halpert and Jim Halpert both acquire sales while making small talk about their baby's upcoming birth. Dwight Schrute wants to do the same and asks Angela Martin to be the mother. Angela is initially excited, but becomes annoyed after Dwight draws up a parenting contract with absurd demands.

Michael Scott anxiously waits for Pam and Jim's baby to be born; Jim urges Pam to let him take her to the hospital, but Pam would rather wait until midnight like she and Jim wanted to do initially (arriving after midnight means a longer hospital stay under the terms of their health insurance). The rest of the office perform absurd activities to distract her from the pain. When Jim reaches his breaking point, Pam reveals that their baby is a girl, which calms Jim's nerves a bit, but then she tells him that her water broke.

Since Pam and Kevin Malone get hungry at the same times, they have enjoyed regular meals together, and Kevin prepares her one final "Ultra Feast" before she gives birth. When the contractions appear to become extreme, Jim, Michael, and Kevin all think it is time for her to go to the hospital. Pam still refuses, and breaks down admitting that she is scared to give birth. Jim initially assures her that everything will be all right, but goes into a panic when he is informed she is now at 2 minutes in between contractions (5–7 minutes is the suggested time to leave for the hospital). Pam finally relents and Michael drives her and Jim to the hospital, with Dwight "escorting" them. Pam realizes she has forgotten her iPod with her desired birth music on it so they request that Dwight retrieve it from their house, asking that he not "touch anything". After 19 hours of labor, Cecelia Marie Halpert is born.

Pam's breastfeeding does not go well, and though a male lactation consultant is summoned to provide apparently successful coaching, Cecelia still fails to latch properly. Against the advice of the nurse, Jim and Pam opt to have Cecelia spend the night with them instead of in the nursery, and are kept up long hours tending to her. A sleep-deprived Pam accidentally nurses a baby who belongs to a new mother in the same hospital room. As Jim and Pam get ready to leave the hospital, Pam manages to breast feed Cecelia while Jim gets the car.

Michael sees the birth as proof that he is a successful office matchmaker. He sets up Kevin on a lunch date with Erin Hannon, making Andy Bernard jealous and finally driving him to ask her out himself, to which she happily accepts as Michael looks on.

At the Halpert residence, Dwight embarks on a search for the iPod only to find mold under the sink and moves in for several days while he reconstructs the cabinets. Dwight and Angela make the final revisions to the parenting contract, but Dwight begins to have second thoughts after an encounter with Pam's friend Isabel, with whom he had a one night stand at Jim and Pam's wedding. He signs the contract, but decides to hold it off.

== Production ==
The first part of the episode was written by Daniel Chun, his second writing credit for the series after "Murder", and directed by Seth Gordon, his second directing credit for the series after "Double Date". The first part was slated to be directed by Rainn Wilson, who plays Dwight Schrute on the series, but due to scheduling conflicts The Office showrunner Paul Lieberstein asked Gordon to step in. By coincidence, during filming Gordon's wife was pregnant and her due date was one week away, so he kept his phone on in case of an early delivery. The second part was written by Charlie Grandy, his fourth writing credit of the series, and directed by Harold Ramis, who also directed "A Benihana Christmas," "Safety Training" and "Beach Games." The episode also guest stars Nelson Franklin playing Nick the IT Administrator who would appear in later episodes, and Linda Purl who played Helene, Pam's mother who previously dated Michael.

Jim and Pam's daughter, Cecilia Marie Halpert, was named after Pam actress Jenna Fischer's niece, who was born one week before filming. Since the production could not use actual newborn babies, Cecelia was played by several five week old babies who had been born prematurely. For the scene where Pam nurses Cecilia while Jim picks up the car, Fischer had to use a pacifier hidden under her breastfeeding apron to get the baby to stop crying, but later in production she was outfitted with a custom-made brassiere with extra padding to make her breasts appear filled with milk and a breakaway nipple piece with a pacifier built in.

During pre-production Angela Kinsey, who plays Angela Martin on the show, brought up how during breastfeeding she had to use a (female) lactation specialist and that it was incredibly uncomfortable and awkward. This inspired the writers to the idea of Jim being disturbed at Pam having to use a male lactation specialist. Feeling Fischer might be uncomfortable having a man handle her breasts, Lieberstein suggested that Fischer's fiancée, Lee Kirk, play the lactation specialist, since he was a trained actor. Kirk had to audition for the role, but later remarked that "if there was ever a layup in the audition world, I mean, this was like a six foot hoop. It was like, 'Just please drop the ball in the basket and make everyone's life easier.'" The prop department had placed a breastfeeding pamphlet on the set, which Kirk read through to educate himself on the part he was playing. The scene was filmed on Groundhog Day, and Fischer took the opportunity to ask Ramis about his acclaimed film Groundhog Day. Kirk recalled, "I remember when you went up to him, we all had sort of — I think everyone was thinking it — and finally you said it. And when he started to talk about Groundhog Day, everyone just kind of came over. We all just moved over and just sat there and listened to him talk about it. It was really, really fun — really exciting."

The delivery room and hall were filmed on a sound stage set. The swaddling scenes were difficult because Fischer and Jim actor John Krasinski were both very good at swaddling and the actress who played the nurse was bad at it, which was the complete opposite of the characters they were playing.

While the episode has a failed attempt at pairing Kevin and Erin, actor Brian Baumgartner revealed he actually pitched to the writers them becoming a couple for considering "their energies matched in a weird way", and also to let Kevin "mature a little bit".

During editing, the producers expressed concern that the episode made it appear that Jim's anxiety was irrational, so the "talking head interview" scene where Jim consults birthing books for the recommended time to leave for the hospital was added in a re-shoot.

== Reception ==
In its original American broadcast, part one of "The Delivery" was watched by 8.71 million viewers, with a 4.5 rating and a 12 share in the 18–49 demographic, with part two increasing in viewers to 9.35 million and a 4.9 rating and a 13 share winning its timeslot both times and helping NBC come third ahead of ABC and The CW. The episode ranked 10th in the weekly 18–49 ratings and ranked 24th in total viewers weekly ratings. It was the last episode of The Office to be viewed by over 9 million viewers.

Dan Phillips of IGN gave the episode a 6.6 saying that Pam's lactation problems and Kevin's lack of personality while dating Erin made consistently amusing plots, "But sadly everything that the episode's half-hour gets right doesn't make up for the painfully uncomfortable and largely unfunny first half." He particularly objected to the length that Pam's refusal to go to the hospital is stretched out, since the entire office supporting her irrational decision even after her water breaks was "uncomfortable and unbelievable". Ken Tucker of Entertainment Weekly gave the episode a positive review saying "Last night managed to combine a thoroughly believable and funny central idea—that Pam would try to delay going to the hospital to get some extra time, gaming the office’s “stupid HMO”—with a batch of fine Michael scenes and a thoroughly didn’t-buy-it-for-a-second Dwight subplot." Nathan Rabin of The A.V. Club gave the episode a B+ saying "It felt a little padded and implausible and lurched from one radically different tone to another but it was also very funny and intriguingly prickly and real when it wasn't being cartoonish and over the top. It wasn't a home run."

Joel Keller of TV Squad gave the episode a mixed review saying "As usual with most one-hour 'Office' episodes, the first half was better than the second. But even the first half of this one had some problems".
