= The Coup (The Office) =

- The Office episode
- Episode no.: Season 3 Episode 3
- Directed by: Greg Daniels
- Written by: Paul Lieberstein
- Cinematography by: Randall Einhorn
- Editing by: Dean Holland
- Production code: 302
- Original air date: October 5, 2006
- Running time: 22 minutes

Guest appearances
- Creed Bratton as Creed Bratton; Charles Esten as Josh Porter; Ed Helms as Andy Bernard; Rashida Jones as Karen Filippelli

Episode chronology
← Previous "The Convention"	Next → "Grief Counseling"
- The Office (American season 3)

"The Coup" is the third episode of the third season of the American comedy television series The Office and the show's thirty-first episode overall. It first aired on October 5, 2006, on NBC in the United States.

The series depicts the everyday lives of office employees in the Scranton, Pennsylvania branch of the fictional Dunder Mifflin Paper Company. In this episode, Jan Levinson (Melora Hardin) becomes unimpressed with how Michael Scott (Steve Carell) is controlling his branch, so Dwight Schrute (Rainn Wilson) tries to take his job and an office power play ensues. Meanwhile, Pam Beesly (Jenna Fischer) conducts a lunchtime fashion show, and the Stamford branch plays Call of Duty as a team-building exercise, something Jim Halpert (John Krasinski) does not do well in.

The episode was written by co-executive producer Paul Lieberstein and directed by executive producer Greg Daniels. Several cast members noted that the episode contained Shakespearean elements, such as Angela Martin's similarities with the Macbeth character Lady Macbeth. According to Nielsen Media Research, the episode was viewed by 4.1% of all 18- to 49-year-olds, and 11% of all 18- to 49-year-olds watching television at the time of the broadcast. Critical reception was largely mixed, with several reviewers criticizing Jim's Stamford storyline.

== Plot ==
Jan Levinson berates Michael Scott when she discovers that he calls the entire office into the conference room every Monday to watch a movie. Angela Martin prods Dwight Schrute to ask Jan to give him Michael's job. After her awkward meeting with Dwight, where he declares he can be a better boss than Michael, Jan calls Michael and demands he get his branch under control.

The Stamford branch plays Call of Duty under the guise of a team-building exercise. New to the game, Jim Halpert plays poorly and draws the ire of his teammates. As he leaves for home, Jim pretends to toss a grenade at Karen Filippelli, who responds by creating a pretend explosion with paper clips. Karen longingly watches Jim leave.

Meanwhile, Pam Beesly decides to revamp her wardrobe after her separation from Roy Anderson and orders some new clothes. When Pam's clothes are shipped to the office, Kelly Kapoor insists that Pam perform a lunchtime fashion show to show off a new blouse. When it draws unwanted attention, Pam concludes that it is too revealing.

Michael leads Dwight to believe that he has been given control of the branch before revealing the ruse. Dwight begs for his job and for Michael's forgiveness while Angela and the rest of the office watch. Dwight offers to do Michael's laundry for a year. When it appears that Michael is on the verge of firing Dwight, Michael insists that they "hug it out, bitch." Dwight quickly returns to being Michael's loyal right-hand man, but Michael is still resentful, and forces Dwight to stand atop a box in the middle of the office, wearing a sign that says "LIAR"—and then promise to do Michael's laundry for a year.

== Production ==
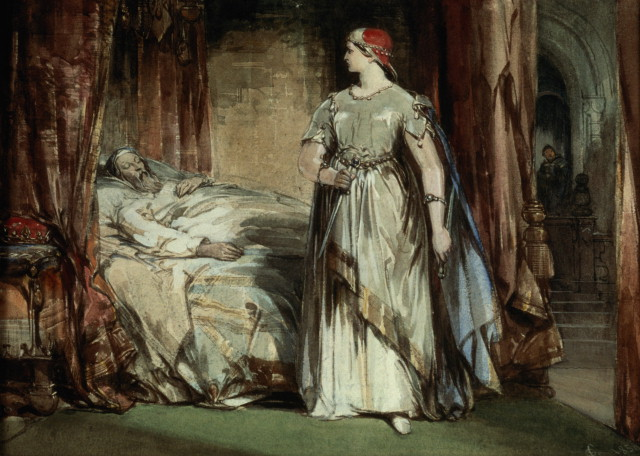
Angela's storyline in this episode has been compared to Lady Macbeth's (pictured) in the play Macbeth.

"The Coup" was written by co-executive producer Paul Lieberstein, who plays series regular Toby Flenderson, and was directed by executive producer and series creator Greg Daniels. Several cast members believed the episode contains Shakespearean themes, in particular elements of the Macbeth character Lady Macbeth in Angela's storyline. Lady Macbeth was depicted as an ambitious woman who "exerted an evil influence over her husband," characteristics that fit with Angela attempting to push her lover, Dwight, into power. In her weekly blog for TV Guide, actress Kate Flannery previewed the episode, "Behind every great man is a pushy woman. Or in this case, a pushy, short, judgmental blonde named Angela. It's the ultimate Adam-and-Eve saga. Angela is about to push the apple in Dwight's face as she persuades him to try to take Michael's place at Dunder Mifflin."

In preparation for some episode scenes, Rashida Jones "took some serious Call of Duty" lessons from the writers, as they all played the online game. In the DVD audio commentary, Rainn Wilson stated that he was happy that the series could "have the nuanced stuff and then the really broad stuff"; he referred specifically to Michael confronting Dwight in this episode as well as to the season's twenty-third episode "Beach Games", where "people are running around in inflatable outfits bashing each other." Also in the audio commentary, Jones suggested that Dwight's punishment – being forced to wear a "liar" sign and stand silently on some boxes in the middle of the office – was reminiscent of the iconic photo of the Abu Ghraib torture and prisoner abuse.

The season three DVD contains a number of deleted scenes that were edited from the episode. These include Creed revealing that he sleeps under his desk four nights a week, Dwight and Angela flirting in the break room after he tries to persuade her to join Movie Monday, Dwight responding to Angela's initial suggestions that he should push Michael out by saying "Michael has the best sales figures in the company's history—I'll never come close to his numbers", Michael becoming suspicious when Pam interrupts to tell him that he has a phone call, Pam responding to Kevin's unwanted attention to her neckline, and Creed reacting to having Dwight as the new boss.

== Reception ==
Overall, "The Coup" had its moments, but it's far from being among the best Office episodes to date. Dwight being shamed and groveling for mercy on Michael's floor was funny (and disturbing) but not as satisfying as when Pam & Jim pull an elaborate prank on Mr. Schrute. Here's hoping the series kick-starts the Pam-Jim storyline again soon, before we start wondering why those documentary cameras are still following Jim way over in the Stamford branch.

— Brian Zoromski, IGN

"The Coup" first aired on October 5, 2006, in the United States on NBC. It received a Nielsen rating of 4.1/11. This means that it was seen by 4.1% of all 18- to 49-year-olds, and 11% of all 18- to 49-year-olds watching television at the time of the broadcast. The episode placed as the 24th most-watched episode for the week in that demographic.

The episode received mixed reviews from television critics. IGN columnist Brian Zoromski rated "The Coup" 7.8/10, indicating it as a "good" episode. He felt that after the "brilliant" episode from the previous week, "The Coup" was "somewhat anticlimactic, as Jim doesn't interact at all with the Scranton branch and the Pam-Jim storyline is pretty much ignored." Despite his disappointment with Jim's storyline, Zoromski commented that the "best moments of the episode were the completely random ones, such as Dwight knowing that Jan wears blouses from Liz Claiborne and earrings from Ann Taylor." AOL TV's Michael Sciannamea was also unhappy with Jim's scenes, writing that they were "beginning to grate on [him]. Is every branch office at Dunder Mifflin filled with crazies? How then does the company stay in business? I think it would have been funnier if Jim ended up in an office where it's nothing but work and no play at all. The Call of Duty bits didn't do much for me."

Kath Skerry of Give Me My Remote called Dwight's groveling "hilarious," but was unsure about Jim and Karen's ending scene, explaining that it "was adorable. Too adorable. And I’m not quite ready to handle the fact that I’m not HATING the idea of Jim and Karen. I feel like I’m betraying Pam. I’m still a JAM shipper all the way, but it’s nice to see Jim smile again." Skerry concluded that "there were some seriously funny, laugh out loud moments tonight, but I don’t think this episode is going to make my favorites list. But even when The Office isn’t at its best, it’s still hands down the best comedy on TV." Television Without Pity graded the episode with an A−. In the audio commentary, Wilson noted that "The Coup" is "not a fan favorite," though it was submitted for an Emmy Award. For his work on this episode, Paul Lieberstein was nominated for a Writers Guild of America Award for Best Screenplay – Episodic Comedy.
