= Beach Games =

- The Office episode
- Episode no.: Season 3 Episode 23
- Directed by: Harold Ramis
- Written by: Jennifer Celotta; Greg Daniels
- Cinematography by: Randall Einhorn
- Editing by: David Rogers
- Production code: 322
- Original air date: May 10, 2007
- Running time: 28 minutes

Guest appearances
- Creed Bratton as Creed Bratton; Rashida Jones as Karen Filippelli; Andy Buckley as David Wallace

Episode chronology
← Previous "Women's Appreciation"	Next → "The Job"
- The Office (American season 3)

"Beach Games" is the twenty-third episode of the third season of the American version of The Office and the 51st of the series. In this episode, the office goes to a nearby lake for some "beach games". It is revealed that Michael (Steve Carell) is being interviewed for a position at corporate and that the winner of the beach games will become regional manager. Meanwhile, Dwight (Rainn Wilson) and Angela (Angela Kinsey) sabotage Andy (Ed Helms), and Pam (Jenna Fischer) spends her day taking notes of the office workers' activities.

The episode was written by Jennifer Celotta and Greg Daniels and directed by Harold Ramis. Filming took place at a fake beach near Hansen Dam, as it was "the bleakest lake [they could] find." The crew had to deal with hot temperatures during the day and "frigid" weather at night. One of Helms' scenes involved him being trapped on a lake in a sumo wrestling outfit, forcing him to wear a harness and be pulled by a boat crewed by a member of the production team. For the fire walk, orange and yellow gels and lava rocks were used, and gas lines were installed to produce flames.

An estimated 7.2 million viewers watched "Beach Games" on its first American broadcast on May 10, 2007, resulting in the episode placing fourth for the night in its timeslot. It received mainly positive reviews from television critics, and many cited the sumo suit scenes and the coal walk scene as particular highlights. Most critics praised Pam's speech at the end of the episode.

== Plot ==
When Michael Scott is invited by CFO David Wallace to interview for a position at Dunder Mifflin corporate headquarters in New York City, he assumes he will get the job. He holds a Survivor-like competition at Lake Scranton to determine his successor. The office staff travel to the lake by bus, except for Toby Flenderson, whom Michael will not allow to attend.

Michael selects the "tribe" captains (Jim Halpert, Dwight Schrute, Andy Bernard and Stanley Hudson) and instructs Pam Beesly to take detailed notes on the events, which include egg and spoon races and hot dog eating contests. Unaware of the purpose of the exercise, the employees do not take it seriously. However, when Michael reveals he is interviewing for the job in New York, Andy and Dwight step up their efforts. Stanley tries to be enthusiastic but quickly gives up. Jim and Karen Filippelli call David and schedule interviews for the same position that Michael is pursuing.

To support her secret lover Dwight, Angela Martin sabotages Andy, leaving him adrift in the lake in an inflatable sumo wrestling costume. Michael's final event is a walk across hot coals. Initially, only Pam volunteers, but Michael refuses to let her compete, saying she lacks the courage to be a manager. However, Michael cannot even bring himself to do it. Dwight throws himself on the coals, refusing to leave until he is given the job, and he writhes in agony until he is dragged off.

As a last-ditch effort to salvage the day, Michael assembles a "Tribal Council" stand-up comedy competition. Jim declines to participate, and reveals that he has applied for the position in New York. While they are doing this, Pam wanders off and runs barefoot across the hot coals. Feeling a new sense of confidence because of the experience, she interrupts the Tribal Council to berate her colleagues for treating her poorly, citing the fact that almost no one attended her art show. She rounds on Jim, and tells him that she called off her wedding because of him, that it is "fine" that he is with someone else now, but that she misses the fun that they had as best friends before he transferred. As she runs to cool her feet in the water, Michael praises her show of courage but says his replacement must have a background in sales.

== Production ==
"Beach Games" was written by co-executive producer Jennifer Celotta and series creator Greg Daniels, and was directed by Harold Ramis, whose credits include the episodes "A Benihana Christmas" and "Safety Training". Celotta and Daniels came up with the idea for the opening scene while researching medical symptoms at WebMD; they began considering ideas for the episode's cold open, and decided to write on what "we're doing right now," resulting in Michael researching symptoms. Michael's later conversation with David Wallace set an important foundation for both the season and the series, as it established that several people would be competing for a corporate job and solidified the CFO as an important character. The actor who plays Wallace, guest star Andy Buckley, was then working at Merrill Lynch as a stockbroker.

Director Harold Ramis filmed much of the episode at a site near Hansen Dam, deemed "the bleakest lake [they could] find."

Originally the crew sought to film at a lake that resembled Lake Scranton. However, upon arriving at one in the area they found that it was too beautiful, as they had wanted a lake that was the equivalent of the dour office: "the bleakest lake [they could] find." Eventually, much of the episode was filmed at a fake beach at the reservoir of Hansen Dam, where it was "a thousand degrees during the day and minus 40 at night," Celotta remarked in the DVD audio commentary. "We had tents pumping air conditioning that didn't work all day long," according to Brian Baumgartner. And at night, the production crew set up heaters everywhere because the weather became "frigid".

Actress Kate Flannery later said that the days of filming were extremely "hot", and she became sick of hot dogs after eating many of them in the contest seen in the episode. The cast members spit out the hot dogs into a shared bucket between takes, an act that sometimes activated Ed Helms' gag reflex. The cast members found the sumo suits uncomfortable, both due to the hot weather and the inability to sit down. Actress Angela Kinsey previewed before the episode broadcast that she would "forever look at John Krasinski differently, because he looked so hilarious to me" wearing his sumo suit. For the scenes of Helms floating in the lake in his sumo suit, the actor wore a wetsuit, a harness, and a fishing line that snaked out through his sleeve, the purpose being to drag him farther out on the lake. A crew member pulled him in a row boat; the crew would film a take of the scene, and then would have to wait fifteen minutes to do it again.

To create a safe enough fire pit to allow the actors to walk on it, the crew used a "light box buried in the ground with orange and yellow gels on it, and lava rocks on top," according to Ramis. Gas lines were also buried in the sand to supply a steady stream of flames. Many of the scenes and lines of dialogue were improvised, such as Andy throwing a rock at a duck and Jim guiding an unsuspecting Karen into the water. For Pam's speech, Daniels and Celotta knew it was important, and discussed with Ramis for about 45 minutes about how best to shoot it. Many different takes were shot, and Celotta thought Fischer "was so amazing, take after take after take." Ramis believed the past 28 episodes had contained a slow build-up to this scene. Daniels wrote most of the speech, though Celotta did contribute some parts.

The third season DVD contains a number of deleted scenes. Notable cut scenes included Jim receiving a call informing him of the job opening, Michael annoying Pam by telling her to grill the hot dogs faster, Dwight sumo wrestling with Stanley, Ryan asking to participate in the fire walk, and Andy failing to flag down a passing car. Jim receiving the call was cut in favor of him hearing about the job opening from Michael and then calling corporate, because the writers felt it showed how Jim had grown to have more initiative and a more corporate-like approach.

== Cultural references ==
On the bus, the cast sing songs such as the Kenny Rogers song "The Gambler" and The Flintstones theme song. Ramis encouraged them to sing, as he had never ridden on a bus where people did not sing. Also in the episode, Michael wears Sandals gear and a beaded necklace, a reference to his Jamaican vacation in "Back from Vacation". According to Helms and the episode's writers, the plot references the reality television series Survivor and The Bachelor, and The Apprentice. Before their work on The Office, the camera men used in this episode shot Survivor for four years. Several media outlets noted similarities between Michael and Jeff Probst, the host of Survivor.

== Reception ==
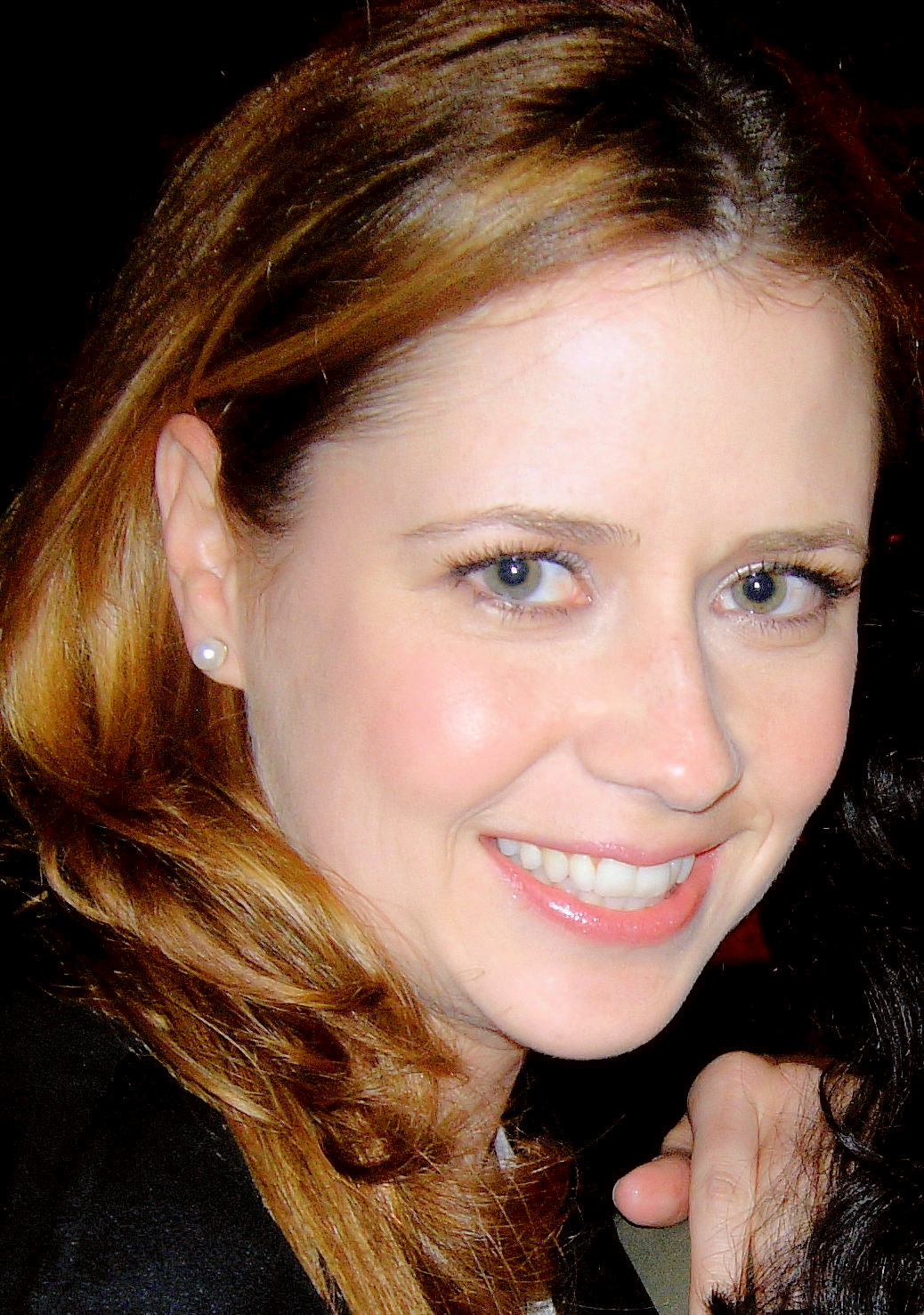
Pam's speech, given by actress Jenna Fischer, was mostly lauded by television critics.

The episode first aired in the U.S. on May 10, 2007, attracting 7.2 million viewers and a 3.9/11 ratings share among adults aged 18 to 49. It ranked fourth in its timeslot behind episodes of Survivor: Fiji, Ugly Betty, and Are You Smarter Than a 5th Grader?. It was a special 28-minute "supersized" episode.

Entertainment Weekly columnist Abby West considered Pam's speech to be "a terrific payoff for those of us invested (some might say too much) in the Jim-Pam-Karen love triangle." West also praised other aspects of the episode, such as the fire walk and the sequences with Stanley; to her, "everyone brought his or her A game (in hilarity, if not in effort) to the race to succeed Michael." IGN's Travis Fickett rated "Beach Games" 8.5/10, an indication of a "great" episode. Like West, he highlighted Stanley for praise, and also liked Helms being trapped on the lake. Fickett concluded that "while this episode's closing scene doesn't have the impact of Jim telling Pam he was in love with her at the end of Season 2, it is one of those long awaited moments that we knew was coming. And Jenna Fischer, as Pam, handles it perfectly. Once again the Scranton branch is facing some big changes, and the show has us eagerly awaiting the season finale."

Give Me My Remote writer Kath Skerry liked the cast's scenes with the sumo suits, but saved most of her praise for Pam's speech. She declared that it "was AMAZING. Jenna Fischer blew me away with that speech. It's what I have been hoping for since the first episode of this season. It didn't end with Jim swooping in and kissing Pam but there's still one episode left in the season. So that's what we have to ponder over the next week." Jay Black of AOLTV also enjoyed the episode. He wrote, "I thought that it was a bit more low key than some of the previous episodes (hilarious sumo outfits not withstanding) and that suited me just fine. I thought that Michael's ridiculousness, always a difficult balancing act, was reigned-in to just this side of believable where it belongs. I thought that it was filled with a great assortment of gags, both character-based and farcical." However, Black was critical of Pam's speech because it felt both "forced" and out of character for Pam to publicly state her feelings.
