= LolliLove =

- DVD cover featuring Gunn and Fischer
- Directed by: Jenna Fischer
- Screenplay by: Jenna Fischer; Peter Alton; James Gunn (uncredited)
- Story by: Jenna Fischer
- Produced by: Stephen Blackehart
- Starring: James Gunn; Jenna Fischer; Linda Cardellini; Jason Segel; Judy Greer; Lloyd Kaufman
- Cinematography: Peter Alton
- Edited by: Peter Alton
- Music by: Willie Wisely; Peter Alton
- Production company: LolliLove Productions
- Distributed by: Troma Entertainment
- Release dates: November 21, 2004 (St. Louis International Film Festival); March 7, 2006 (DVD)
- Running time: 64 minutes
- Country: United States
- Language: English
- Budget: $1,500

LolliLove is a 2004 American mockumentary co-written by, directed by and starring Jenna Fischer. The film satirizes a hip, misguided Southern California couple who decide to make a difference in the lives of the homeless by giving them lollipops with a cheery slogan on the wrapper.

== Cast ==
- James Gunn as James
- Jenna Fischer as Jenna
- Jason Segel as Jason
- Linda Cardellini as Linda
- Judy Greer as Judy
- Lloyd Kaufman as Father Lloyd
- Peter Alton as Narrator
- Larry Fitzgibbon as Larry

== Production ==
The film stars James Gunn, Fischer's then-husband, and Peter Alton, who were also co-writers, though about half of the film's dialogue was improvised by the cast. Fischer talked about the creative process behind the film in an interview with a St. Louis magazine:

I started by writing a plot outline. I invited my friends over to the house and I filmed us acting out the scenes. At that point, all of the dialogue was improvised. I gave very general character notes and people just ran with it. I used the tapes to write the script. I expanded the characters and streamlined the dialogue. I found some things that worked and some that didn’t. We all met about six months later to shoot the film. We had a full script at that time. I still encouraged improvisation and some of our best stuff is improvised. But I made sure we did scene as scripted at least once. That way, I knew I had the right material for editing.

The film mixes fact and fiction: Gunn's and Fischer's characters are named James and Jenna Gunn, the film was shot in their actual home, and it incorporates footage from their real-life wedding and home movies.

Principal photography cost $1,500 and was completed in 12 days. The film premiered at the St. Louis International Film Festival (in the hometown of Fischer and Gunn) in November 2004 and appeared at the Sonoma Valley Film Festival and the TromaDance Film Festival in 2005, and screened during the Cannes Film Festival market in May 2006. It was released on DVD by Troma Entertainment on March 7, 2006.

== Reception ==
The film received mostly positive reviews. A reviewer for Variety described it as "spot-on satire" and "chuckle-packed and satisfyingly tasteless" and wrote that the film "nails the condescending vapidity, manufactured drama and ludicrous self-importance of reality shows". Adam Hackbarth, who interviewed Fischer, recommended the film as a "gritty and hilarious Trojan horse assault on the typical self-loving weekend philanthropist." Upon the film's DVD release, the DVDTalk review said it is "one of the best films of the year - a riotous comedy about charity and the homeless. Really," in spite of being released by Troma Films, and credits director Fischer with infusing "the terribly tricky genre with just the right amount of raucous realism." In Film Threat, the film is described as "so damned believable that it’s difficult, at times, to watch. Director Jenna Fischer has done a remarkable job here and if she continues on this esoteric and off-beat path she may find herself among the ranks of Christopher Guest and company." Nathan Rabin of The A.V. Club found it "funny, smart and casually satirical," but noted, "even at sixty-five minutes it still feels a little padded, like a killer short film on steroids."

== Awards ==
- For her role in the film, Fischer was awarded a Screen Actors Guild Emerging Actor Award.
- For her feature directorial debut, Fischer won the 2005 Kodak Independent Soul Award at the 2005 Tromadance film festival, hosted by the company that James Gunn previously worked for, where he created the cult classic Tromeo and Juliet.
