= Back from Vacation =

- The Office episode
- Episode no.: Season 3 Episode 12
- Directed by: Julian Farino
- Written by: Justin Spitzer
- Cinematography by: Randall Einhorn
- Editing by: Dean Holland
- Production code: 311
- Original air date: January 4, 2007
- Running time: 21:10

Guest appearances
- Creed Bratton as Creed Bratton; Ed Helms as Andy Bernard; Rashida Jones as Karen Filippelli; David Koechner as Todd Packer; Craig Robinson as Darryl Philbin

Episode chronology
← Previous "A Benihana Christmas"	Next → "Traveling Salesmen"
- The Office (American season 3)

"Back from Vacation" is the twelfth episode of the third season of the American comedy television series The Office and the show's 40th episode overall. It first aired on January 4, 2007, on NBC, and it was the first episode to air after the December holiday hiatus. "Back from Vacation" was the first script written by Justin Spitzer for the series. Julian Farino served as the episode director.

The series depicts the everyday lives of office employees in the Scranton, Pennsylvania, branch of the fictional Dunder Mifflin Paper Company. In this episode, Michael Scott (Steve Carell) returns from his vacation in Jamaica and has a luau in the warehouse to celebrate. It is revealed that he went to Jamaica with Jan Levinson (Melora Hardin) when a racy photograph of him and Jan is circulated. Meanwhile, Karen Filippelli (Rashida Jones) and Jim Halpert (John Krasinski) have an argument over Karen's living situation, leading to Pam Beesly (Jenna Fischer) offering him advice.

According to Nielsen Media Research, the episode was watched by an estimated 8.80 million viewers. Among the 18–49 demographic, it earned a 4.3/11 ratings share and helped NBC finish in first place for the night. "Back from Vacation" received praise from critics, with Carell's performance receiving positive attention in particular.

== Plot ==
Michael Scott returns from his Jamaican vacation rejuvenated, and directs the Party Planning Committee to throw a luau-themed party in the warehouse to accompany the annual inventory. Pam Beesly informs Michael that Hannah Smoterich-Barr, an employee from the recent merger, had quit while he was away. When Pam notices Jan Levinson in the margins of a photo from Michael's vacation, he admits to the documentary crew that he and Jan went to Jamaica together.

Michael attempts to send another vacation photograph to Todd Packer as proof of the trip, but mistakenly chooses "Packaging" instead of "Packer" from the address menu, sending the photograph to the entire shipping warehouse, including Darryl Philbin, the warehouse supervisor. The photo is quickly forwarded throughout the office and beyond. Michael enlists Dwight Schrute's assistance in preventing its spread, but these efforts are largely ineffective.

Karen Filippelli has been upset with Jim Halpert because he expressed objections to the prospect of Karen moving into an apartment two blocks from his own. Pam convinces Jim that he is being unreasonable, and Jim accepts her advice and apologizes to Karen. Pam tells the documentary crew that she was glad to help Jim, but is then shown later to be crying in private, secretly in love with him and heartbroken over the fact that he is with Karen instead. Dwight walks in on her crying. He awkwardly attempts to console her, although he misunderstands: "So, you're PMSing pretty bad, huh?"

During the luau/inventory, Jan arrives at the office to speak with Michael in private. Michael is terrified that Jan is there to confront him over the widely spread photo, but she appears to be unaware of it, instead confessing her attraction to him against all reason and kissing him.

== Production ==
"Back from Vacation" was written by Justin Spitzer, a staff writer who joined The Office in its third season. The episode was his first script for the series. Spitzer found Jan's final scene with Michael – in which he expects she will yell at him for their circulated picture but instead informs him they are staying together – especially tricky to write. Unsure of how to craft the scene, Spitzer eventually requested advice from the other series' writers. They decided that Jan would give a "psychobabble" response to Michael. Sitting on a panel of television writers at Northwestern University, Spitzer briefly described her reasoning, "Jan’s nuts. She has some bad psychiatrist giving her bad advice." He praised the benefits of a "good writers room," in which "scenes go to this place you never could have gone to alone."

"Back from Vacation" was directed by Julian Farino, who later was responsible for directing "The Deposition", a fourth season episode that featured some of the ramifications of Michael's circulated picture. Recurring actors Creed Bratton, Ed Helms, Rashida Jones, Craig Robinson, and David Koechner appeared as guest stars in "Back from Vacation". This was the final episode to feature background character Louanne.

The season three DVD contains a number of deleted scenes, such as Michael arriving from Jamaica at the airport, wearing warm-weather clothes, Dwight, Meredith, Angela and Kevin separately reacting to the news that Michael took Jan to Jamaica, and Jan maintaining the ruse that she was in Scottsdale while talking to a coworker at Corporate, who is viewing the photo on his computer. Additional scenes include Dwight complaining about Jim's pranks while Michael was on vacation, Roy helping Ryan with inventory, Andy challenging Dwight to a box-stacking race, and Meredith climbing on a shelf, which falls and traps her.

== Reception ==
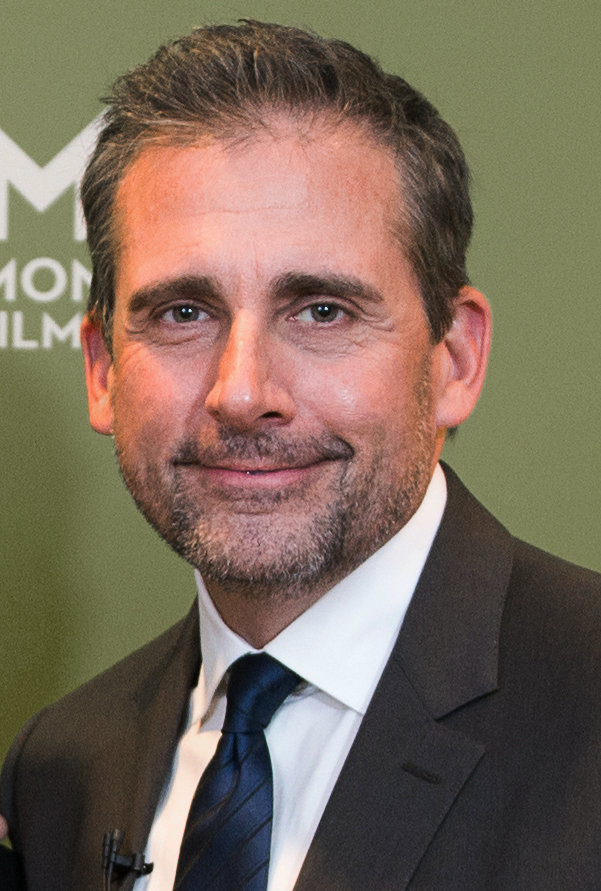
Steve Carell's performance in the episode was a particular source of praise.

"Back from Vacation" first aired on January 4, 2007 in the United States on NBC. It was the first episode of the season to air after the end of the December holiday break. According to Nielsen Media Research, an estimated 8.80 million viewers watched the episode. It earned a 4.3/11 ratings share among adults aged 18 to 49, meaning that it was seen by 4.3 percent of all 18- to 49-year-olds, and 11 percent of all 18- to 49-year-olds watching television at the time of broadcast. The Office and its lead-in show, My Name Is Earl, helped NBC finish in first place for the night in that demographic.

The episode attracted positive reviews from critics. Brian Zoromski of IGN rated "Back from Vacation" 9.7/10, an indication of an "amazing" episode. Stated highlights included the opening sequence, Carell's performance, and Pam's storyline with Jim and Karen. Zoromski concluded in his review that "with so much attention to detail, realistic character reactions, and very few completely over-the-top comedy moments, 'Back from Vacation' is one of the best Office episodes yet this season. We're very glad they're back." AOL TV's Michael Sciannamea expressed surprise that Jan accompanied Michael on his vacation and immediately wanted to discover more about their relationship. He was also intrigued with Dwight's attempt to cheer up Pam, until the PMS joke when he thought it "would have been very interesting if Dwight had been a real comfort to her and offered his friendship." Sciannamea concluded that "this was just a terrific episode. Well written, well acted, and had you begging for more at the end. What more can you ask for?"

Writing for Entertainment Weekly, Abby West focused on Carell's acting, explaining that "the way that Michael's desire to boast and his healthy fear of offending Jan played out on Steve Carell's face was fantastic. From his braggadocio on the phone with Todd Packer (Packer!) to his death march up the stairs to face Jan, it was a thing of beauty." BuddyTV's Oscar Dahl believed that "Back from Vacation" was "one of the two or three best of the season", opining that "simplicity" was the key to the series' success. Dahl continued, "Each episode's premise can be entirely mundane and inconsequential. It will still mine laughs from the situation at hand. We also had some nice development in the Jim-Pam-Karen triangle, with Pam giving Jim relationship advice, then bawling her eyes out afterwards. Maybe the best scene in the episode saw Dwight comfort her." Television Without Pity graded the episode with an A.
