= The Office (American TV series) season 3 =

Season of television series

The Office
- Season 3
- DVD cover
- Showrunner: Greg Daniels
- Starring: Steve Carell; Rainn Wilson; John Krasinski; Jenna Fischer; B. J. Novak; Melora Hardin; David Denman; Ed Helms; Leslie David Baker; Brian Baumgartner; Kate Flannery; Mindy Kaling; Angela Kinsey; Paul Lieberstein; Oscar Nunez; Phyllis Smith
- No. of episodes: 25

Release
- Original network: NBC
- Original release: September 21, 2006 – May 17, 2007

Season chronology
- ← Previous; Season 2 Next → Season 4

The third season of the American sitcom The Office premiered in the United States on NBC on September 21, 2006, and concluded on May 17, 2007. The season had a total of 25 half-hours of material, divided into 16 half-hour episodes, five 40-minute "super-sized" episodes, and two one-hour episodes. The Office is an American adaptation of the British TV series as a mockumentary portraying the daily lives of office employees in the Scranton, Pennsylvania branch of the fictitious Dunder Mifflin Paper Company. The season stars Steve Carell, Rainn Wilson, John Krasinski, Jenna Fischer, and B. J. Novak, with supporting performances from Melora Hardin, David Denman, Ed Helms, Leslie David Baker, Brian Baumgartner, Kate Flannery, Mindy Kaling, Angela Kinsey, Paul Lieberstein, Oscar Nunez, and Phyllis Smith.

The season marked the move of main character Jim Halpert (John Krasinski) from Scranton to Stamford, and also introduced Rashida Jones as Karen Filippelli, and Ed Helms as Andy Bernard—both members of Dunder Mifflin Stamford—as recurring characters. Helms would later be promoted to series regular. The main plot for the early episodes of the season deals with a recurring problem in seasons one and two—the problem of company downsizing—while in the last half of the season, intra-office relationships (specifically those among Pam, Jim, and Karen; Dwight and Angela; and Michael and Jan Levinson) also become major plot points.

The third season of The Office aired on Thursdays at 8:30 p.m. (ET). The season saw its ratings increase from the previous. In addition, it continued the critical praise that had started during the show's second season. The season was released on DVD in a box set containing four discs. While the DVD features all 25 episodes, the episodes "Traveling Salesmen" and "The Return" were condensed into one episode. The set contained commentaries from creators, writers, actors, and directors on some of the episodes, while also containing deleted scenes from all of the episodes. It was released by Universal Studios Home Entertainment.

== Production ==
The Office was officially renewed for a third season before the second-season episode "The Carpet" aired on January 26, 2006. Series star Jenna Fischer noted that while it is rare "to hear news of a pickup so early", the decision came early because of how pleased NBC was with the show's burgeoning success.

This season of the show was produced by Reveille Productions and Deedle-Dee Productions, both in association with NBC Universal Television Studio. The show is based on the British series created by Ricky Gervais and Stephen Merchant, who are executive producers on the show and wrote the third-season episode "The Convict". This season was produced by Greg Daniels, who also served as its showrunner. Returning writers included Daniels, Michael Schur, Gene Stupnitsky, Lee Eisenberg, Jennifer Celotta, Mindy Kaling, Paul Lieberstein, and B. J. Novak. New writers for the season included Brent Forrester, Justin Spitzer, and Caroline Williams.

This season's episodes were directed by twelve different directors: Of these individuals, Daniels, Ken Kwapis, Ken Whittingham, Randall Einhorn, Tucker Gates, Jeffrey Blitz, and Harold Ramis all directed multiple episodes, whereas Roger Nygard, Miguel Arteta, Julian Farino, Joss Whedon, and J. J. Abrams each directed an episode apiece. Gordon, Kwapis, Whittingham, and Daniels had all previously directed episodes during seasons one and two. While The Office was mainly filmed on a studio set at Valley Center Studios in Van Nuys, California, the city of Scranton, Pennsylvania, where the show is set, was used for shots of the opening theme.

After reports that claimed the show would be "ending in March" were released, Fischer clarified in a TV Guide article that this date referred only to the season finale and that the show had been renewed for another season. However, this season's finale would eventually air in May, rather than March.

== Cast ==
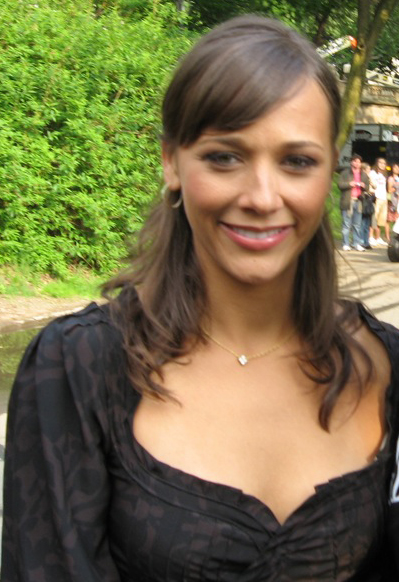
Rashida Jones had a recurring role in the third season as Karen Filippelli.

The Office employed an ensemble cast. Most of the main characters, and some supporting ones, are based on characters from the British version of the show. While these characters normally have the same attitudes and perceptions as their British counterparts, the roles have been redesigned to better fit the American show. The show featured a large cast size, many of whom were known for their improvisational work.

=== Main ===
- Steve Carell as Michael Scott, Regional Manager of the Dunder Mifflin Scranton Branch. Loosely based on David Brent, Gervais' character in the British version, Scott is a dim-witted and lonely man, who attempts to win friends as the office comedian, usually making himself look bad in the process.
- Rainn Wilson as Dwight Schrute, who, based upon Gareth Keenan, is the Assistant to the Regional Manager, although the character frequently fails to include "to the" in his title.
- John Krasinski as Jim Halpert, a sales representative and prankster, who is based upon Tim Canterbury, and is in love with Pam Beesly, the receptionist.
- Jenna Fischer as Pam Beesly, who is based on Dawn Tinsley. She is shy, but is often a cohort with Jim in his pranks on Dwight.
- B. J. Novak as Ryan Howard, who for the first two seasons is a temporary worker, but is promoted to sales representative in this season.

=== Starring ===
- Melora Hardin as Jan Levinson, Michael's boss and love interest.
- David Denman as Roy Anderson, Pam's ex-fiancé and a warehouse worker.
- Ed Helms as Andy Bernard, a preppy salesman with anger issues, who is transferred from the Stamford branch.
- Leslie David Baker as Stanley Hudson, a grumpy salesman.
- Brian Baumgartner as Kevin Malone, a dim-witted accountant.
- Kate Flannery as Meredith Palmer, a promiscuous supplier relations representative.
- Mindy Kaling as Kelly Kapoor, the shallow and talkative customer service representative.
- Angela Kinsey as Angela Martin, a judgemental accountant, who serves as Dwight's love interest.
- Paul Lieberstein as Toby Flenderson, the sad-eyed human resources representative.
- Oscar Nunez as Oscar Martinez, an intelligent accountant, who is also gay.
- Phyllis Smith as Phyllis Vance, a motherly saleswoman.

=== Recurring ===
- Rashida Jones as Karen Filippelli, a saleswoman transferred from the Stamford branch, who serves as Jim's new love interest.
- Creed Bratton as Creed Bratton, the office's strange quality assurance officer.
- Craig Robinson as Darryl Philbin, the warehouse manager.
- Andy Buckley as David Wallace, Dunder Mifflin's CFO.
- Charles Esten as Josh Porter, Regional Manager of the Dunder Mifflin Stamford branch.

== Reception ==
=== Ratings ===
Ratings for each episode of The Office that aired this season.^{i}

The third-season premiere "Gay Witch Hunt" received a 5.7/9 in the Nielsen ratings, meaning that on average 5.7 percent of households were tuned in at any given moment and 9 percent of all televisions in use at the time were tuned into the program. The premiere was watched by 9.1 million viewers, and marked a slight increase from the second season premiere "The Dundies". At the onset of the season, the show began to eclipse the viewership of its lead-in program, My Name Is Earl. The season hit a low with the nineteenth episode "The Negotiation", which was viewed by 6.74 million viewers. The season finale, "The Job" was viewed by 7.88 million viewers, also an increase from the second-season finale "Casino Night". By the end of the 2006–07 season, it placed 68th, a one-place slip from the previous season. Despite this, the show's third season was slightly more watched than the previous: it averaged 8.3 million viewers, and scored a 4.1/11 in the Nielsen ratings, meaning that on average 4.1 percent of households 18–49 years old were tuned in at any given moment and 11 percent of all televisions in use at the time were tuned into the program. This season of The Office also ranked as the 28th-most watched series in the 18–49 demographic.

=== Reviews ===
The third season of The Office was met with critical acclaim. Review aggregator website Metacritic gave the third season of the show an 85 out of 100 rating, which indicates "universal acclaim". Travis Fickett of IGN wrote that, in its third season, The Office was one of the "smartest, funniest and most likable shows" on television. Entertainment Weekly writer Meeta Agrawal praised the show for separating the action between Jim in Stamford and the rest of the characters in Scranton—a creative choice, Agrawal argued, that many other shows would have likely fumbled. Ultimately, Agrawal gave the season an "A−". Francis Rizzo III of DVD Talk called the season "an outstanding year for the Scranton crew" and praised the "unbelievably funny 21 episodes in between" the opener and the finale as reasons as to why it was "a great stand-alone season from easily one of the funniest shows on TV."

The third season was the first season to feature hour-long episodes, "A Benihana Christmas" and "The Job". While the following season would be criticized for its overuse of hour-long episodes, both of season three's longer episodes received a favorable reception.

=== Awards ===
The third season of The Office received seven nominations for Primetime Emmys at the 59th Primetime Emmy Awards, and won the award for Outstanding Writing for a Comedy Series for the episode "Gay Witch Hunt", as well as the award for Outstanding Single-camera Picture Editing For A Comedy Series for "The Job". The Office was also nominated for the Emmy for Outstanding Comedy Series, with the award going to 30 Rock. Other nominations included Outstanding Lead Actor in a Comedy Series for Steve Carell for his portrayal of Michael Scott, Outstanding Supporting Actor for Rainn Wilson for his portrayal of Dwight Schrute, Outstanding Supporting Actress for Jenna Fischer for her portrayal of Pam Beesly, Outstanding Directing for a Comedy Series for Ken Kwapis for directing the episode "Gay Witch Hunt", and another nomination for Outstanding Writing for a Comedy Series for Michael Schur for the episode "The Negotiation".

== Episodes ==
In the following table, "U.S. viewers (million)" refers to the number of Americans who viewed the episode on the night of broadcast. Episodes are listed by the order in which they aired, and may not necessarily correspond to their production codes.

No. overall	No. in season	Title	Directed by	Written by	Original release date	Prod. code	U.S. viewers (millions)
29	1	"Gay Witch Hunt"	Ken Kwapis	Greg Daniels	September 21, 2006	3001	9.11
Months have passed since the events of the season two finale "Casino Night". during that time, Jim has transferred to the Stamford branch, and Pam has broken off her engagement with Roy. Michael learns that Oscar is gay, and with Dwight, contacts Jim regarding buying a "gaydar" machine to figure out who else in the office is gay. Michael accidentally outs Oscar to everyone. Feeling bad, Michael hosts a meeting about homosexuality, where he attempts to present himself as open-minded and progressive, and ends up forcing Oscar into kissing him. This results in Dunder Mifflin giving Oscar a three month paid vacation and a company car. Meanwhile, Jim attempts to adjust to life at the Stamford branch, with his new co-workers Andy and Karen. Jim's attempts to make Andy the "new Dwight" fail when Andy reacts violently to one of Jim's pranks.
30	2	"The Convention"	Ken Whittingham	Lee Eisenberg & Gene Stupnitsky	September 28, 2006	3006	7.78
Michael and Dwight leave for a sales convention in Philadelphia, where they meet Josh, the manager of Dunder Mifflin Stamford, and Jim. Michael feels threatened by Josh, and attempts to one-up him by throwing a party in his hotel room. When no one shows up, Jim takes pity on Michael, telling him that he is a good boss and was not the reason he left Scranton. Meanwhile, Kelly sets Pam up on a blind date that goes poorly. Concurrently, Michael ends up making a big sale without putting in much effort.
31	3	"The Coup"	Greg Daniels	Paul Lieberstein	October 5, 2006	3002	8.89
Michael's managerial tactics lead Angela and Dwight to conspire to take Michael's job. Dwight meets with Jan, who, after listening to Dwight's propositions, later calls to inform Michael that his own employees are conspiring against him. Michael informs Dwight that Jan has promoted him to regional manager in an attempt to make Dwight confess. However, Dwight immediately takes over the office and begins making sweeping changes. Michael, unable to control his anger, reveals to Dwight that he knows everything. Dwight begs for forgiveness and offers to do his laundry to make it up to him. Meanwhile, at Dunder Mifflin Stamford, Josh's managerial tactics include playing Call of Duty as a team-building exercise. Unfortunately, Jim is less than competent at the game.
32	4	"Grief Counseling"	Roger Nygard	Jennifer Celotta	October 12, 2006	3003	8.83
Michael learns that his former boss Ed Truck has died. Seeing that his employees are not shaken by the news, Michael begins to ponder his own mortality. While mourning, Michael learns that a bird was killed by flying into a window earlier that morning, and he decides to have a funeral for the bird later that day. Meanwhile, at Dunder Mifflin Stamford, Jim and Karen embark on a quest for Karen's favorite potato chips.
33	5	"Initiation"	Randall Einhorn	B. J. Novak	October 19, 2006	3005	8.46
Dwight takes Ryan out to the Schrute Family Beet Farm for an initiation session before his first sales call. The initiation, involving odd styles of hazing and bizarre parables, angers Ryan, who does not make the sale. Back at the office, Jan asks Pam to document Michael's activities for a day. Michael, oblivious, spends most of the day waiting in line for a free pretzel in the lobby.
34	6	"Diwali"	Miguel Arteta	Mindy Kaling	November 2, 2006	3004	8.81
Kelly invites the entire staff to a celebration of Diwali, the Hindu Festival of Light. At the festival, Michael is inspired by his conversation with Kelly's parents over Hindu marriage customs; he decides to impulsively proposal to his girlfriend, Carol, who promptly rejects hims before leaving. An emotionally distraught Michael then tries—and fails—to kiss Pam. In Stamford, Jim, Andy, and Karen stay late to do sales figures. Andy and Jim do shots to pass the time, which leads Karen to have to drive a drunk Jim home.
35	7	"Branch Closing"^{†}	Tucker Gates	Michael Schur	November 9, 2006	3007	8.05
Jan informs Michael that the Dunder Mifflin board has voted to close the Scranton branch, and for the Stamford branch to absorb the remnants of Scranton. Michael announces this to the office, leading the employees to plan for their futures. Michael, in a last-ditch effort to save his branch, leaves with Dwight to surprise Duner Mifflin's chief financial officer, David Wallace, at his home. They wait outside all day, but David never shows up, and they resign themselves to defeat. However, Josh, the regional manager of the Stamford branch, announces that he is leaving the company to take another job, and a decision is made for the Scranton branch to absorb the Stamford branch instead. Michael and Dwight celebrate, believing that they were the ones who brought about the change.
36	8	"The Merger"^{†}	Ken Whittingham	Brent Forrester	November 16, 2006	3008	8.43
Due to Dunder Mifflin Stamford closing, six members of the staff (Jim, Karen, Andy, Martin, Tony, and Hannah) move to and take jobs in Scranton. Michael attempts to welcome his new employees, but naturally ends up alienating and offending them; eventually he accidentally humiliates Tony, who announces that he is quitting. Michael becomes defensive, and fires him instead. Andy tries to ingratiate himself with Michael, causing Dwight to become jealous. Excited that he is back, Pam tries getting her old friendship back with Jim. Unfortunately, the situation grows awkward when she asks him out for coffee to catch up, only for him to turn her down and reveal that he has begun dating Karen.
37	9	"The Convict"	Jeffrey Blitz	Ricky Gervais & Stephen Merchant	November 30, 2006	3010	9.07
Michael learns that Martin, one of the former Stamford employees, is a reformed criminal. The staff learns that his time was spent in a white-collar prison, and begins to wonder if Martin's prison is better than Dunder Mifflin Scranton. Michael then gives a presentation on the miseries of prison, with most of his ideas fueled by the sensational portrayal of prison in pop culture. Bitter that he is not being taken seriously, he then locks his employees in the conference room. At the end of the day, Martin decides to quit rather than continue working with Michael.
38	10	"A Benihana Christmas"^{‡}	Harold Ramis	Jennifer Celotta	December 14, 2006	3009	8.44
39	11	"A Benihana Christmas"^{‡}	Harold Ramis	Jennifer Celotta	December 14, 2006	3014	8.44
Michael plans to invite Carol to Jamaica with him for Christmas, but she breaks up with him before he has a chance. Andy takes Michael to a local Benihana to cheer him up, and they both convince waitresses to come back to the Christmas party with them. Back at the office, a disagreement within the Party Planning Committee leads Karen and Pam to create their own Christmas party, separate from Angela's. When the majority of the office decide to go to Karen and Pam's party, Angela becomes upset, and seeing this, Karen and Pam decide to combine the parties. Soon after, Michael and Andy's dates leave them, but Michael nevertheless finds someone to go to Jamaica with him.
40	12	"Back from Vacation"	Julian Farino	Justin Spitzer	January 4, 2007	3011	8.80
Michael returns from Jamaica, and accidentally lets slip that he went with Jan. When he tries to send a revealing picture of Jan to Todd Packer, he inadvertently sends it to the warehouse, and soon the picture is spread throughout the entire company. Jim and Karen have an argument over Karen moving into an apartment close to where Jim lives, until Pam mediates a solution between them. Although she appears happy to have helped, she is later seen crying. Jan, who has yet to find out about the picture of her and Michael, later appears at the office and tells Michael that she wants a relationship.
41	13	"Traveling Salesmen"	Greg Daniels	Michael Schur & Lee Eisenberg & Gene Stupnitsky	January 11, 2007	3012	10.15
Dwight arrives late for an early morning meeting, where Michael announces that the members of the sales staff are teaming up for sales calls in an Amazing Race-esque challenge. Andy spends the day trying to convince Michael that Dwight is untrustworthy. Meanwhile, Kevin informs Angela that the branch's quarterly tax reports weren't received in New York, but Angela assures him that the problem was handled. When the teams return, Andy discovers that Dwight's morning tardiness was due to delivering the reports to New York for Angela. Andy presents Michael with Dwight's toll booth receipt and convinces Michael that Dwight is once again trying to obtain the regional manager position. Pressed by Michael on the reason for his trip to corporate, Dwight declines to reveal his relationship with Angela, resigning his position instead.
42	14	"The Return"^{†}	Greg Daniels	Lee Eisenberg & Gene Stupnitsky & Michael Schur	January 18, 2007	3013	9.32
Oscar's return from his vacation prompts Michael to host a Mexican-themed party. Meanwhile, Jim searches for someone to play a prank with, eventually turning to Pam; they steal Andy's phone, hide it in the ceiling and repeatedly call it, playing his homemade ring tone over and over. Andy becomes more angry each time the phone rings, and eventually punches a hole in the wall out of frustration. As a result of this outburst, Andy is sent to anger management training. Michael, increasingly distraught over Dwight's resignation, leaves and confronts him at Staples, inviting him back to Dunder Mifflin. After being confronted by Karen, Jim reveals to her that he still has feelings for Pam.
43	15	"Ben Franklin"	Randall Einhorn	Mindy Kaling	February 1, 2007	3015	10.01
The women of the office hold a bridal shower for Phyllis, while the men hold a bachelor's party for her groom-to-be, Bob Vance. After being convinced to hire a stripper for both the men and the women's parties by Todd Packer, Michael orders Jim and Dwight to choose the strippers. For the men's party, Dwight hires a stripper, while for the women's party, Jim hires a Ben Franklin impersonator.
44	16	"Phyllis' Wedding"	Ken Whittingham	Caroline Williams	February 8, 2007	3016	8.84
Phyllis lets Michael be a part of her wedding in return for allowing her to take extra time off work for her honeymoon. Michael attempts to dominate the festivities, and acts as the host of their reception. Pam is incredulous to see Phyllis has used most of the plans from her own cancelled wedding with Roy. Feeling lonely, she approaches Roy and strikes up conversation, and they leave the wedding together.
45	17	"Business School"	Joss Whedon	Brent Forrester	February 15, 2007	3017	8.84
In an attempt to get extra credit, Ryan invites Michael to his business school as a guest speaker. Michael attempts to make a motivational speech, unaware that Ryan has introduced him as an ineffectual manager of an out of touch company. Meanwhile, a bat is discovered in the office, leading Dwight to lead an attempt to capture it. That night, Pam displays her artwork at an art show, and is disappointed when few of her co-workers attend. Michael finally arrives after giving his speech and, in a moment of genuine kindness, compliments her work and buys her painting of the Dunder Mifflin office building.
46	18	"Cocktails"	J. J. Abrams	Paul Lieberstein	February 22, 2007	3018	8.25
The Dunder Mifflin CFO David Wallace holds a cocktail party at his house, which Jan, Michael, Jim, Karen and Dwight attend. Michael's antics around their "coming out" appear to annoy Jan, but she later attempts to have sex with him in a bathroom. Michael feels uncomfortable and turns her down, angering her. While all of this is going on, Jim and David Wallace bond by playing basketball. While at a bar, Pam reveals to Roy that Jim kissed her at the casino night. Roy is infuriated and proceeds to trash the bar, assisted by his brother. Pam immediately breaks up with Roy, who then declares that he's going to "kill" Jim.
47	19	"The Negotiation"^{†}	Jeffrey Blitz	Michael Schur	April 5, 2007	3019	6.74
Roy enters the office and attempts to attack Jim, but Dwight's timely intervention with pepper spray saves Jim from injury. Roy is immediately fired, but later apologizes separately to both Jim and Pam (telling the latter to pursue the former). Jim tries to thank Dwight for saving him, only for Dwight to steadfastly refuse to accept his thanks. Meanwhile, Michael and Darryl journey to New York to negotiate pay raises.
48	20	"Safety Training"	Harold Ramis	B. J. Novak	April 12, 2007	3020	7.71
Michael feels ashamed when, during a safety training course, the warehouse employees make fun of him for having a safer work environment. Determined to show that office life can be dangerous, he decides to demonstrate depression effects by faking a suicide attempt. His plan to jump off of the roof and onto a bouncy castle go awry when the employees discover what he is doing and are forced to talk him down. Meanwhile, Andy attempts to endear himself to Dwight after returning from anger management.
49	21	"Product Recall"	Randall Einhorn	Justin Spitzer & Brent Forrester	April 26, 2007	3025	7.56
Paper from Dunder Mifflin Scranton featuring an obscene watermark of two cartoon animals having sex left by a disgruntled paper-mill ex-employee is accidentally sent out to customers, throwing the business into damage control. The accountants attempt to provide service for angry customers, while Michael contacts the media in a misguided attempt to avoid scandal. Meanwhile, Jim and Andy go to a local high school to apologize personally to the principal, and they bump into Andy's girlfriend, who turns out to be a student there.
50	22	"Women's Appreciation"^{†}	Tucker Gates	Gene Stupnitsky & Lee Eisenberg	May 3, 2007	3021	6.99
After Phyllis is the victim of a flashing in the parking lot, Michael attempts to host a seminar on women's issues. When it doesn't go as expected, he takes the women of the office on a trip to the mall, while Dwight and Andy search for the flasher and distribute flyers. At the mall, Michael discusses his discomfort in his relationship with Jan, and the women advise him to break up with her. As Michael is breaking up with Jan via voicemail, she suddenly arrives at the office.
51	23	"Beach Games"^{†}	Harold Ramis	Jennifer Celotta & Greg Daniels	May 10, 2007	3022	7.17
David Wallace calls and informs Michael that he is a candidate for an opening position in the corporate office in New York. Believing himself the obvious choice for the job, Michael decides to choose a successor. He takes his employees to the beach and compels them to compete in challenges to determine which of them will take over his position, not realizing that Jim and Karen are also contenders for the job. In the evening, on a high after a firewalk, Pam confesses that she is tired of being ignored, and tells Jim that he was the reason she called off her wedding.
52	24	"The Job"^{‡}	Ken Kwapis	Paul Lieberstein & Michael Schur	May 17, 2007	3023	7.88
53	25	"The Job"^{‡}	Ken Kwapis	Paul Lieberstein & Michael Schur	May 17, 2007	3024	7.88
After evaluating their relationship, Michael decides to repel any advances that Jan makes towards him, but instantly changes his mind and gives her a second chance once he sees her with a breast enhancement. Michael, Jim, and Karen then all travel to New York to interview for the position that is opening in the corporate office. Before he leaves, Michael names Dwight as his successor in Scranton; after appointing Andy as his new number two, Dwight immediately goes about changing the appearance and structure of the office. In New York, Michael's interview ends as he learns that the new position is linked to Jan's upcoming dismissal. Jan learns of the move, and confronts David, with Michael following her. Jan, now unemployed, decides to move in with a hesitant Michael, who now returns to his position as Scranton manager. Jim's interview goes well until he finds a good-luck memento left for him by Pam. Realizing he cannot leave her again, he returns to the office alone, where he asks her on a date. The corporate job is given to an ecstatic Ryan, who immediately breaks up with Kelly.

== DVD release ==
The third season of The Office was released by Universal Studios Home Entertainment as a four-disc Region 1 DVD box set on September 4, 2007, followed by a Region 2 release on July 21, 2008. The set contains all 25 episodes—including the "super-sized" and one-hour installments—presented in a 1.78:1 aspect ratio with Dolby Digital 5.1 Surround sound and optional English and Spanish subtitles. Bonus features include audio commentaries on 8 episodes, as well as an assortment of deleted scenes. The collection also features a variety of digital and promotional content, such as the "Kevin Cooks Stuff in the Office" featurette, the "Lazy Scranton" and Dwight Schrute music videos, an interview with Joss Whedon, a series of "Toby Wraparounds", a blooper reel, excerpts from the 2006 NBC Primetime Preview and the 58th Annual Primetime Emmy Awards, and winning entries from the "Make Your Own Promo" contest.

== Explanatory notes ==
^† denotes a "super-sized" 40-minute episode (with advertisements; actual runtime around 28 minutes).
^‡ denotes an hour-long episode (with advertisements; actual runtime around 42 minutes).
^i Information on individual episode ratings can be found in the "Episodes" section.
