= A Benihana Christmas =

- The Office episodes
- Episode nos.: Season 3 Episodes 10/11
- Directed by: Harold Ramis
- Written by: Jennifer Celotta
- Cinematography by: Randall Einhorn
- Editing by: Dean Holland
- Production code: 309/314
- Original air date: December 14, 2006
- Running time: 42 minutes

Guest appearances
- Creed Bratton as Creed Bratton; Ed Helms as Andy Bernard; Rashida Jones as Karen Filippelli; Nancy Walls as Carol Stills; Brittany Ishibashi as Cindy; Stephen Saux as Justin Spitzer; Craig Robinson as Darryl Philbin; Kat Ahn as Amy; Kulap Vilaysack as Nikki

Episode chronology
← Previous "The Convict"	Next → "Back from Vacation"
- The Office (American TV series) season 3

"A Benihana Christmas" is the tenth and eleventh episodes of the third season of the American comedy television series The Office and the thirty-eighth and thirty-ninth episodes overall. It was written by Jennifer Celotta and directed by Harold Ramis. The episode originally aired in the United States on December 14, 2006, on NBC.

In the episode, Christmas time at the office leads to depression for Michael, when his girlfriend Carol (Nancy Walls) breaks up with him. Michael, Andy, Dwight, and Jim then go to a local Benihana restaurant, where Michael and Andy find dates with two of the restaurant's waitresses. Back at the office, after a conflict with a bossy Angela, Karen and Pam decide to create their own Christmas party. When the majority of the office decide to go to Karen and Pam's party, Angela becomes upset, and seeing this, Karen and Pam decide to combine the parties. Soon after, Michael and Andy's dates leave them, but Michael nevertheless finds someone to go to Jamaica with him.

== Plot ==
Carol Stills confronts Michael Scott about the Christmas card he sent her, in which he superimposed his head on the body of Carol's former husband in a family photo. She breaks off the relationship, leaving Michael heartbroken and stuck with a pair of tickets to Jamaica. For the past several months, Pam Beesly has led Dwight Schrute to believe that he is being recruited by the CIA, and her gift to Jim Halpert is that he can choose Dwight's first assignment. Jim declines the gift and claims that as the new office "Number Two" he should not be engaging in such activities, leaving Pam discouraged by a changed Jim.

Andy Bernard takes Michael to Benihana to help him forget his recent troubles; Michael drags Dwight and Jim along. The group stumbles upon an unexpecting couple at the table and Dwight fails when attempting to impress the chef with his knowledge of Japanese knives. Andy successfully isolates Dwight from the rest of the party and convinces Michael to ask out their waitress, Cindy. Meanwhile, Jim plays pranks on Dwight and realizes that his excuse for declining Pam's gift does not hold water.

Angela Martin kicks Karen Filippelli off the Party Planning Committee. In response, Pam reaches out to Karen, and the two plan a rival party. Jim appears uncomfortable with Pam and Karen's new friendship. Roy comes into the break room and chats with Pam. After he leaves, Karen suggests that Pam should date Roy. Pam pauses to tell Karen her history with Roy before instead replying with "maybe". The rival Christmas parties begin, and the office staff members are forced to choose sides. Pam and Karen's party is a hit, while Angela's is a dreary affair. Michael and Andy each return with a waitress as their "new girlfriend" (though neither is the one who waited on them at the restaurant). Angela accepts Pam's offer to merge the parties. The office employees unite by signing karaoke and exchanging gifts.

During Michael and Andy's turn to sing, Michael realizes he is unable to tell the two waitresses apart. To remedy this, he secretly marks his date's arm with a Sharpie. When he offers to take her to Jamaica, she declines. The two waitresses then leave the party after losing interest.

Jim consoles Michael by explaining that he just had a "rebound" relationship. Jim mentions that they are fun for a while, but then you keep on thinking about the girl that broke your heart, implying he still thinks about Pam (the girl who "broke his heart"). During the party, Michael secretly retreats to his office and makes a phone call asking an unknown person to go to Jamaica with him. The offer is accepted. Pam is crushed when she sees Jim and Karen exchange gifts. Jim is crushed when he sees Roy give a gift to Pam.

At the end of the day, Jim tells Pam that a helicopter will be arriving to take Dwight to a welcoming party at CIA headquarters in Langley, Virginia. As Dwight waits on the roof, he receives the text message: "You have been compromised. Abort mission. Destroy phone." Dwight throws his phone off the roof and walks away.

== Production ==
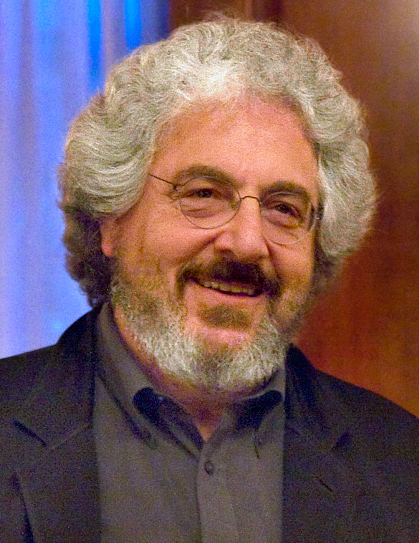
"A Benihana Christmas" was directed by Harold Ramis.

"A Benihana Christmas" was written by Jennifer Celotta and directed by Harold Ramis. Ramis would return to direct the third-season episodes "Safety Training" and "Beach Games", as well as the sixth-season episode "The Delivery" (Pt. II).

The episode was shot in a real Benihana restaurant in Encino, California. The production crew hired all of the restaurant's chefs and waitstaff, along with 78 background actors, to play in the episode. During filming, John Krasinski threw a shrimp across the table at Rainn Wilson. It bounced off Dwight's glasses and landed in the glass of water from which he was about to drink; according to actor Ed Helms, "It was a one-in-a-million shot that pretty much shut down the set for five or 10 minutes of applause." Ultimately, however, Ramis decided not to use the footage because it looked so improbable as to be unbelievable.

The actresses who played the women that Andy and Michael bring back to the office were different from the actresses who played the waitresses in the Benihana restaurant. According to the show's prop master, this was because Andy and Michael failed to pick up the original waitresses, and settled for "less attractive ones". However, at Paley Fest 2007, Greg Daniels admitted that the women they cast were "too good-looking", which led to the joke failing since the original script specifically called for Andy and Michael's dates to be unattractive.

== Reception ==
"A Benihana Christmas" was first broadcast on December 14, 2006, in the United States. According to estimates by Nielsen Media Research the episode was watched by an estimated 8.44 million viewers. The episode earned a 3.9/11 ratings share among adults aged 18 to 49, meaning that it was seen by 3.9 percent of all 18- to 49-year-olds, and 11 percent of all 18- to 49-year-olds watching television at the time of broadcast. Among that demographic, The Office finished in twenty-first place for the week among all of the major networks. On the day that the episode first aired, it was the second most watched show of the night, behind only CBS's Survivor: Cook Islands.

"A Benihana Christmas" was generally well received by critics. The episode was also given a 9.2 out of 10 rating by IGN. An IGN review stated:

This week marked the second year in a row The Office has done a Christmas episode, and it's already become such a great way to play the characters off each other, that we can't help but hope they continue the tradition every season. To be fair, at a full hour, this episode was perhaps a bit too much of a good thing, as the first 15 minutes or so were a bit sluggish. But even then, there were amusing moments to be had, such as Dwight arguing with Toby over whether he could cook a dead goose he brought in – [h]aving hit it with his car, he considered it a "Christmas miracle".
– Eric Goldman, IGN

Years after the episode originally aired, the storyline involving the Benihana waitresses received renewed scrutiny in the wake of acknowledgement of racism against Asian Americans. Kat Ahn, the actress who played the waitress that Michael brought back to the office, said in an interview with The Washington Post that she was disenchanted upon realizing she had been cast on the show "just... to be the joke". Ahn also posted a video on TikTok, which she explained: "The storyline with myself and the other Asian American actress is that we were the uglier versions of the actresses at the Benihana. Also that all Asian people look alike. We're one big monolith and just one big walking stereotype without any personality or any individuality, which is problematic. The whole joke was that all Asians look alike and that's why Michael Scott couldn't tell us apart." In a 2020 episode of the Office Ladies podcast, Jenna Fischer and Angela Kinsey noted that they cringed when re-watching the episode in 2020, and reflected that "the storyline would [not] have been written today."
