= Branch Closing =

- The Office episode
- Episode no.: Season 3 Episode 7
- Directed by: Tucker Gates
- Written by: Michael Schur
- Cinematography by: Randall Einhorn
- Editing by: Dean Holland
- Production code: 307
- Original air date: November 9, 2006
- Running time: 30 minutes

Guest appearances
- Creed Bratton as Creed Bratton; Charles Esten as Josh Porter; Ed Helms as Andy Bernard; Rashida Jones as Karen Filippelli; Craig Robinson as Darryl Philbin

Episode chronology
← Previous "Diwali"	Next → "The Merger"
- The Office (American season 3)

"Branch Closing" is the seventh episode of the third season of the American comedy television series The Office and the show's 35th overall. It was written by co-executive producer Michael Schur and directed by Tucker Gates. An edited version of the episode first aired on November 9, 2006, on NBC; later that night, a longer "producer's cut" edition was released, with deleted scenes edited into the full episode and broadcast on the website NBC.com. This uncut episode is the version included on the Season 3 DVD set.

The series depicts the everyday lives of office employees in the Scranton and Stamford branches of the fictional Dunder Mifflin Paper Company. In this episode, the Scranton branch has varied reactions to news that their branch will close. Michael Scott (Steve Carell) and Dwight Schrute (Rainn Wilson) head to the CFO's house to convince him not to close it. When head of the Stamford branch Josh Porter (Charles Esten) announces he is quitting, the employees find that the company's plans have changed.

According to Nielsen Media Research, an estimated 8.05 million viewers watched "Branch Closing" on its first broadcast. Critical reception to the episode was very positive, with one reviewer opining that it "expertly combines character-driven and situational humor, while realistically presenting a major change that advances the stories of all the characters. The result is a fantastically funny, enjoyable and realistic half-hour."

== Plot ==
Jan Levinson informs Michael Scott that the Scranton branch will close, with a few people transferred to Stamford and the rest laid off. Michael takes the news badly, and soon tells the rest of the office prematurely.

Michael and Dwight Schrute decide to confront CFO David Wallace at his home. Back at the office, Ryan Howard takes this opportunity to break up with Kelly Kapoor, Meredith Palmer tries to remember a promise that she made about sleeping with someone on the last day of work, Creed Bratton begins selling off the office equipment for profit, and Stanley Hudson begins relishing the thought of retiring with severance.

Stamford branch manager Josh Porter informs Jan he has obtained a better position at Staples after leveraging the anticipated promotion. This shock forces Jan to close Stamford instead, and she offers Jim Halpert the number two position in Scranton, but he is reluctant to accept it.

The Scranton branch is relieved when they hear they are saved, and Kelly is thrilled that she and Ryan do not have to break up after all. When Michael and Dwight get the news, they celebrate their success, believing, erroneously, that they accomplished it. After agonizing over the decision, Jim accepts the position and suggests to Karen Filippelli that she join him in Scranton. In a talking head interview, Karen admits that even though she does not think he is "into her," she is "kind of into him".

== Production ==
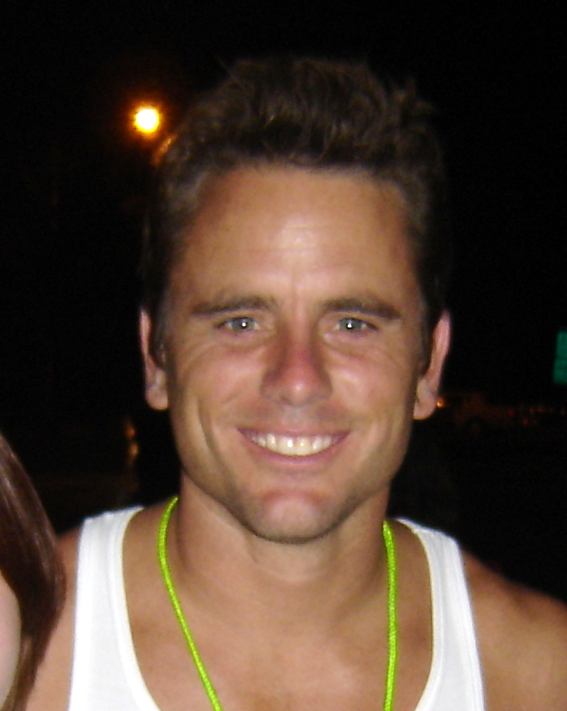
"Branch Closing" featured the last appearance of guest actor Charles Esten.

"Branch Closing" was written by co-executive producer Michael Schur and directed by Tucker Gates. On her MySpace blog, actress Jenna Fischer urged readers to watch the episode, declaring that "The stuff [Michael and Dwight] do together is the absolute funniest thing ever on our show. And also the most touching... The entire episode is amazing. I can't wait for you to see it." The episode featured recurring guest stars Ed Helms, Rashida Jones, Craig Robinson, and Charles Esten. This episode marks Esten's last appearance in the series.

The same night the episode first aired, NBC.com released a "producer's cut", which contained additional scenes and extra footage not shown in the first broadcast. Vivi Zigler, the executive vice president NBC digital entertainment and new media, explained that "this is a first-of-its-kind and a real bonus for fans of The Office. It's also a natural for this show which has continually pushed the envelope in the digital landscape. We're seeing an incredible audience reaction to the evolving digital extensions of our programming and anticipate this being one of their favorites."

In her weekly blog post for TV Guide, actress Kate Flannery wrote of the producer's cut, "Isn't that cool? I think the Office fans are going to really dig it. I love the Stamford characters. Everyone is so much fun to work with." This version contained two new story lines and other minor additions and changes, including Meredith remembering an agreement to have sex with a coworker on the final day of employment, Creed selling electronics and furniture from the office, Andy having a plan in case he gets laid off, and Ryan admitting that Kelly has a strange power over him.

== Reception ==
"Branch Closing" first aired on NBC in the United States on November 9, 2006. According to Nielsen Media Research, it was watched by an estimated 8.05 million viewers. The episode was broadcast again on March 1, 2007, in its normal timeslot, receiving a viewership of 6.5 million people and a 3.0/8 rating share among adults aged 18 to 49. This was consistent with other repeat airings of the series on Thursday nights; the episode also retained 100 percent of its adult audience from its lead-in, My Name Is Earl.

"Branch Closing" has received generally positive reviews from television critics. IGN's Brian Zoromski rated it 10 out of 10, making it one of only two third-season episodes he deemed a "masterpiece". He explained that the episode "is a perfect example of why The Office is the best-written comedy currently on the air. The episode expertly combines character-driven and situational humor, while realistically presenting a major change that advances the stories of all the characters. The result is a fantastically funny, enjoyable and realistic half-hour." Michael Sciannamea of AOL TV felt that because of the poor economy, the episode "surely hit home with quite a number of people," and added that it shows that Michael "does have a soul... you ended up rooting for him to save the day." Sciannamea highlighted Stanley's reaction to the branch closure as one positive element, though he criticized the Ryan–Kelly storyline as "tiresome".

Entertainment Weekly columnist Abby West lauded the episode, writing that it "had almost everything we could want: all the major players in the mix, an unexpected (not-really) twist, a juicy little revelation, and the short-term promise of a Jim/Pam reunion." She was pleased with the emphasis on Jim and the way he "wonderfully bookended the conflicting emotions Michael inspires". West also believed that the "writers did a great job of creating the sense of crisis that resulted in the Scranton branch instead absorbing Stamford (I never trusted that Josh guy) even though fans of the original knew it was going to end up that way." Television Without Pity graded "Branch Closing" with an A.
