= Safety Training (The Office) =

- The Office episode
- Episode no.: Season 3 Episode 20
- Directed by: Harold Ramis
- Written by: B. J. Novak
- Cinematography by: Randall Einhorn
- Editing by: David Rogers
- Production code: 320
- Original air date: April 12, 2007

Guest appearances
- Creed Bratton as Creed Bratton; Rashida Jones as Karen Filippelli; Craig Robinson as Darryl Philbin; Patrice O'Neal as Lonny Collins

Episode chronology
← Previous "The Negotiation"	Next → "Product Recall"
- The Office (American season 3)

"Safety Training" is the twentieth episode of the third season of the American comedy television series The Office and the show's forty-eighth episode overall. Written by B. J. Novak, who also acts in the show as sales representative Ryan Howard, and directed by Caddyshack and National Lampoon's Vacation director Harold Ramis, the episode aired in the United States on April 12, 2007, on NBC.

In the episode, Michael Scott (Steve Carell) attempts to prove life in an office is dangerous after Darryl Philbin (Craig Robinson) berates him about the dangers of the warehouse. The attempts lead him to the roof of the building, where he tries to show that depression caused by an office can lead to desperate circumstances. Meanwhile, gambling between the other employees of the office leads Karen Filippelli (Rashida Jones) to discover that she is still an outsider.

== Plot ==
When Michael Scott repeatedly disrupts Darryl Philbin's warehouse safety training session, Lonny Collins and Darryl mock the office workers' safety session in retaliation, claiming that office work does not entail physical danger. Offended by Darryl's disdain for office safety training, Michael decides to demonstrate the risk of depression and suicide by jumping off the roof, landing on a hidden trampoline. When Michael tests out the trampoline by dropping a watermelon from the roof, it bounces off and hits an office worker's car, prompting it to be replaced by a bouncy castle hidden from the general view of the parking lot. From the roof of the building, Michael talks dramatically about the dangers of depression. When the bouncy castle is discovered, Jim and Pam realize that Michael is "going to kill himself pretending to kill himself." The employees collectively talk Michael down from the roof, with Darryl doing most of the talking, to assure Michael that he is brave simply by living as himself. At the end, the car that was hit by the watermelon is revealed to be Stanley's, who is shocked to see the mess.

Meanwhile, the office staff begins betting on various things, from counting the jelly beans in Pam Beesly's candy dish to whether Creed Bratton will notice that his apple has been replaced with a potato. Karen Filippelli loses every bet, realizing that she is not yet as familiar with the office as she thought she was. Also, Andy Bernard is back after several weeks in anger management training, determined to make a fresh start with his co-workers. His attempts to go by the name Drew are unsuccessful, and Dwight Schrute decides to shun Andy for three years, although he often "unshuns" him to inform him of Michael's plans.

== Production ==
"Safety Training" was the second episode of the series directed by Harold Ramis. Ramis had previously directed the episode "A Benihana Christmas" earlier in the third season. The episode was the sixth of the series written by B. J. Novak, though Novak has downplayed his role, describing the script as "a group effort" involving significant contributions from everyone in the writing staff and from Ramis. Novak also acts in the show as Ryan Howard. The main plot idea, conceived during The Office's second season, was inspired by the true story of a football player and coach who pretended to get into a fight and threw a dummy off of a roof. The writing staff thought this seemed like something the character Michael Scott might do to pretend to commit suicide, and worked backward from there.

The writers were concerned about hitting the right emotional tone with the episode, and elements of the script were reworked right until the end of production. Writers Michael Schur and Greg Daniels argued at length just over Ryan asking Dwight if he would be okay wearing a long-sleeved T-shirt outside; Schur wanted the line cut because he thought it was unclear whether Ryan was being sarcastic or not. Brian Baumgartner, who portrays accountant Kevin Malone, stated concerning how director Harold Ramis impacted the show, "...our structure and how the show is written is all there and pretty much doesn't change. Harold [Ramis] might have ideas or specific changes that would change a moment." The idea of Dwight Schrute "shun"ing and then "un-shun"ing Andy Bernard came from staff writers Gene Stupnitsky and Lee Eisenberg, while the accompanying hand movement was improvised by actor Rainn Wilson. The cast and crew of The Office were so intimidated by actor Patrice O'Neal's massive size when he first guest-starred on the series that someone likened him to a sea monster; this ended up working its way into the script for "Safety Training".

Jim actor John Krasinski had changed his haircut to be in the movie Leatherheads, so for this episode he wore a hairpiece with a more reddish color than his natural hair.

The crew anticipated that they would need CGI effects to create the shot of the watermelon bouncing off the trampoline onto Stanley's car, but in one of the takes, the real watermelon bounced onto the car as scripted, eliminating the need for CGI.

== Reception ==
"Safety Training" received a 4.1/11 in the Nielsen ratings among people ages 18–49, meaning that 4.1 percent of all people 18–49 watched the episode, and 11 percent of all people 18–49 watching TV at the time viewed the episode. "Safety Training" received 7.7 million viewers overall.

The episode was almost universally praised by critics. Abby West of Entertainment Weekly complimented the writing of B.J. Novak in the episode, saying that "This was another gem... [Novak] kept a very nice light touch on the whole love triangle thing, only giving us that one wonderfully uncomfortable moment at Pam's desk when they were betting on how many jelly beans were in the container." IGN's Brian Zoromski rated it 10 out of 10, making it one of only two third-season episodes he deemed a "masterpiece". He stated that "Another truly brilliant episode of The Office aired this week, with more humor packed into the half-hour than you get in many feature-length comedies." Zoromski also praised the acting by minor characters, such as Creed Bratton and Mindy Kaling, who portrays customer service representative Kelly Kapoor.

BuddyTV Senior Writer Oscar Dahl stated that "What can you say? The Office is, if anything, only getting better. Last week's super-sized episode was absolutely spectacular, but tonight's might have been even better." Dahl went on to say that both storylines of the episode were the main contributors to the success of the episode.
