= Jenna Fischer =

American actress (born 1974)

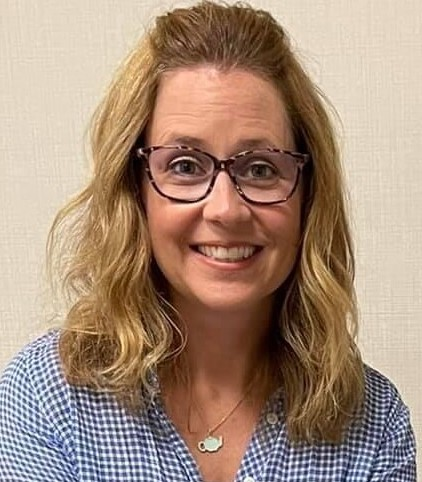
- Fischer in 2021
- Born: Regina Marie Fischer; March 7, 1974 (age 52); Fort Wayne, Indiana, US
- Education: Truman State University (BA)
- Occupation: Actress
- Years active: 1998–present
- Spouses: James Gunn (m. 2000; div. 2008); Lee Kirk (m. 2010)
- Children: 2

Regina Marie Kirk (née Fischer; born March 7, 1974), known professionally as Jenna Fischer, is an American actress and podcast host. She is best known for her role as Pam Beesly on the NBC sitcom The Office (2005–2013), for which she was nominated for the Primetime Emmy Award for Outstanding Supporting Actress in a Comedy Series in 2007; she was also a producer for the series' ninth and final season.

Fischer also had starring roles on the Sky 1 and NBC comedy-drama series You, Me and the Apocalypse (2015) and the ABC sitcom Splitting Up Together (2018–2019). She had starring roles in the comedy films Blades of Glory (2007), Walk Hard: The Dewey Cox Story (2007), The Promotion (2008), Hall Pass (2011), and The Giant Mechanical Man (2012), a film directed by her husband, Lee Kirk. She also had starring roles in the drama films Solitary Man (2009), Brad's Status (2017), and The 15:17 to Paris (2018). Fischer had supporting roles in Employee of the Month (2004), Slither (2006), and Mean Girls (2024).

Fischer is the co-host of the podcast Office Ladies alongside her The Office co-star, Angela Kinsey. Fischer's first book, The Actor's Life: A Survival Guide, was published in November 2017.

== Early life ==
Fischer was born in Fort Wayne, Indiana, and raised in St. Louis, Missouri. Her mother, Anne (née Miller), is a history teacher; her father, James E. Fischer, is an engineer. She has one younger sister, Emily, a third grade teacher. She first performed at the age of six, when she participated in an acting workshop taught by her mother at Henry School in St. Louis, a workshop also attended by actor Sean Gunn, with whom she grew up.

She later attended Pierremont Elementary School in Manchester, Missouri, and Nerinx Hall High School, a private all-girls Catholic school in Webster Groves, Missouri. She holds a Bachelor of Arts in theater, as well as a minor in journalism, from Truman State University, where she originally enrolled as a pre-law history major.

== Career ==
=== Early work and LolliLove ===
While attending college at Truman State University, Fischer performed with a touring Murder Mystery Dinner Theatre group. Upon her move to Los Angeles in 1998, she began performing Commedia dell'arte with the Zoo District Theatre Company, and was noticed by a talent agent during her appearance in their musical adaptation of the 1922 film Nosferatu. This led to her signing a contract with the agent.

Fischer struggled to break into film and television. Her first paying film role was in a sex education video for psychiatric patients upon their release from Ronald Reagan UCLA Medical Center. Three years elapsed from the time she arrived in California until she landed her first televised speaking role, playing a waitress on the TV sitcom Spin City in 2001. She subsequently had bit parts in small independent films, including Employee of the Month, Lucky 13, and The Specials, then progressed to guest roles on television series including Cold Case, Miss Match, Off Centre, Six Feet Under, Strong Medicine, That '70s Show, Undeclared, and What I Like About You.

Unsatisfied with her career's progress, Fischer took matters into her own hands, writing, directing and starring in her own mockumentary, LolliLove (her only directing credit), co-starring her then-husband James Gunn, and friends Linda Cardellini, Judy Greer, Lloyd Kaufman, and Jason Segel. She began participating in The Artist's Way, a self-led creativity seminar in book form. "From doing that book I got this idea ... When we started it, it wasn't even supposed to be a real movie. It was just going to be an improv project for James and I to amuse ourselves with."

LolliLove premiered in November 2004 at the St. Louis International Film Festival (Fischer's and Gunn's hometown), and was also shown at the TromaDance Film Festival. For her role, Fischer received the Screen Actors Guild Emerging Actor Award. Despite the film's contribution to her career, she admitted to a St. Louis arts and entertainment magazine that the experience dissuaded her from future directing: "The directing was exhausting and the writing was painful. It was very difficult to direct and star in a movie. We also had a very small crew so I did a lot of things a normal director doesn't have to do, like make the props and serve lunch. I was simultaneously getting into character, going over my lines, set dressing the next shot, coaching an actor, and brainstorming with my D.P. I'm good at multitasking, but that was too much for me. I couldn't enjoy any one part the way I would have liked. I think I'll stick to acting. That part was fantastic."

=== The Office and career expansion ===
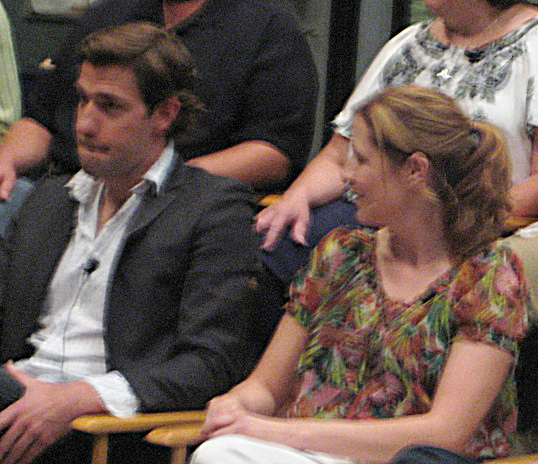
Fischer with The Office co-star John Krasinski in 2009

In 2005, after a succession of mostly improvised auditions similar to her LolliLove experience, Fischer landed the role of Pam Beesly on what became the NBC hit The Office, based on the original BBC series. Before her first audition, casting director Allison Jones told her: "Dare to bore me." While looking for acting work, Fischer herself spent several years as a receptionist and administrative assistant in Los Angeles offices.

"I'm so attached to Pam's journey", she told NPR in 2009. "I just love playing this character so, so much." Soon after The Office premiered, Fischer was focused on the series' success. In an April 2005 interview with her alma mater's student newspaper, she said: "Honestly, it would be great to get to play Pam for a long, long time ... I don't have real big aspirations to be a movie star. I would love to be on a long-running hit TV show. You end up playing a defining role."

For the third season of The Office, Fischer was nominated for Outstanding Supporting Actress in a Comedy Series at the 59th Primetime Emmy Awards in 2007. In January 2008, the cast of The Office won Outstanding Performance by an Ensemble in a Comedy Series at the 14th Screen Actors Guild Awards. Fischer, who was voted to deliver the acceptance speech on their behalf, said: "We really love working together. We love each other, we love working together, and being together. And as an ensemble, a lot of people in this group struggled for a long time as non-working actors—like 8, 12, 15, 20 years. So, we're always grateful, we don't take it for granted. Thank you so much."

Fischer appeared on Bravo's Celebrity Poker Showdown in 2006, participating in the series' eighth tournament, shot in New Orleans, Louisiana, and playing for Catholic Charities USA's Tsunami Relief. In 2007, she starred in the music video for Willie Wisely's single "Through Any Window", directed by longtime friend John Cabrera; she knew Wisely from work he had done on soundtracks for LolliLove and Tromeo and Juliet, one of her husband's films. In December 2007, during the Writers Guild of America strike, Fischer appeared at Sacred Fools Theater Company in episode 25 of Darque Magick, a serialized play written and directed by Jenelle Riley.

Also in 2006, she co-starred in Gunn's film Slither; Fischer said that Gunn gave her the role of Shelby as a "birthday present". In 2007, she filmed supporting roles in three feature films: The Brothers Solomon, with Will Arnett and Will Forte; Blades of Glory, with Arnett, Will Ferrell, Jon Heder and Amy Poehler; and Walk Hard: The Dewey Cox Story, with John C. Reilly, with whom she co-starred again in 2008's The Promotion, also starring Seann William Scott.

In 2009, Fischer completed shooting on the films Solitary Man and A Little Help; the latter opened in the summer of 2010 at the Seattle International Film Festival. Also that summer, she filmed on the Farrelly brothers comedy Hall Pass, which was released in February 2011. She was named a producer of the mid-August to October 2010 run of the critically acclaimed play Sad Happy Sucker, written by her husband Lee Kirk and directed by friend Sean Gunn. It previously ran as a theatre workshop in February and March 2007.

In July 2009, Fischer played left field for the National League team in the Taco Bell All-Star Legends and Celebrity Softball Game as part of the MLB All-Star Week festivities at Busch Stadium in St. Louis, Missouri, where she grew up. She was a spokeswoman for Proactiv Skincare Solutions that year and was the voice behind the Wisconsin Milk Marketing Board Grilled Cheese Academy website in 2010. In March 2010, she returned to co-chair an annual fundraiser auction for her alma mater Nerinx Hall High School, where she auctioned off a set visit to The Office and multiple autographed props from the series.

Fischer at the premiere of Brad's Status in 2017

After finishing The Office, Fischer starred in the off-Broadway play Reasons to Be Happy, written and directed by Neil LaBute, which ran from May to June 2013. She starred in the world premiere of Steve Martin's comedy Meteor Shower at the Old Globe Theatre in San Diego, California, from July 30 to September 18, 2016. She also worked with actors Greg Germann, Alexandra Henrikson, and Josh Stamberg.

In April 2018, Fischer was interviewed on Jimmy Kimmel Live! wearing only a towel and jeans when the zipper on her dress broke shortly before she went on. She came out on stage carrying the dress she'd intended to wear and commented to the audience: "I'm mentally freaking out [because] I'm on a talk show in a towel, but I'm physically very comfortable."

In September 2019, Fischer announced that she and Angela Kinsey would co-host a weekly The Office rewatch podcast called Office Ladies, which premiered in October. Its first episode was released October 16, 2019. Their guests have included actors John Krasinski, Oscar Nunez, and Rainn Wilson, and producers/directors Greg Daniels, Paul Feig, and Ken Kwapis. Fischer and Kinsey continued to produce the podcast during the COVID-19 pandemic by recording it in closet studios in their homes. In January 2021, Office Ladies won the 2021 iHeartRadio Podcast of the Year Award.

In February 2021, Fischer and Kinsey announced that they wrote a book, titled "The Office BFFs: Tales of The Office from Two Best Friends Who Were There", a collection of stories and photos about their friendship and time on The Office. The book was published on May 17, 2022, by HarperCollins Publishers LL as a hardcover, e-book, and audiobook.

In February 2023, Fischer was announced to play Mrs. Heron in the film adaptation of the Broadway musical Mean Girls, based on the 2004 film of the same name.

In October 2024, Fischer and Kinsey announced the next phase of Office Ladies, which will begin when they complete their rewatch. Beginning on November 6, Office Ladies will move to a twice-a-week format with the Wednesday episodes being called "Office Ladies 6.0". Future episodes, Fischer and Kinsey said, will feature new interviews, more stories from the set, their patented "deep dives" into random topics and in-depth character studies. In addition to "Office Ladies 6.0", they will rerun the rewatch over from the beginning, along with new material, in a podcast that will begin on November 11 called "Second Drink". According to Audacy, Office Ladies has more than 400 million downloads, and in Edison Research's stats for the Top 50 podcasts in the United States for the second quarter of 2024, the podcast appeared at No. 34, and more than a million listeners follow the podcast on Spotify.

== Personal life ==
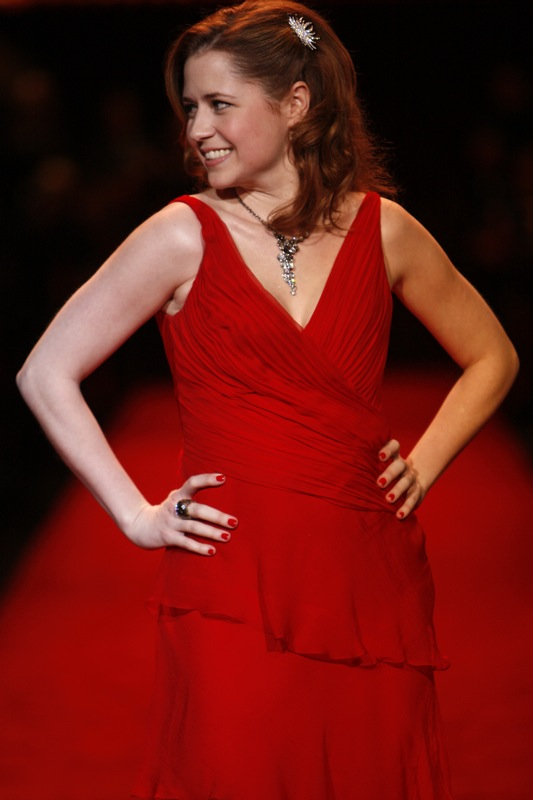
Fischer in 2008

After Fischer moved to Los Angeles, her childhood friend Sean Gunn helped her get a part in a showcase and then introduced her to his brother, filmmaker James Gunn. That small part in a showcase led to Fischer getting her first manager. She and James Gunn married in October 2000. They announced their separation in September 2007, and divorced in 2008. In 2010, Fischer helped Gunn cast Rainn Wilson, her The Office co-star, in Gunn's film Super.

In June 2009, Fischer's engagement to filmmaker Lee Kirk was announced. The two met and fell in love on the set of The Giant Mechanical Man, a film written and directed by Kirk, which premiered at the Tribeca Film Festival in April 2012.

Fischer told Vulture: "I attached myself as producer and actor to the movie. Then, for the next six or eight months or so, Lee was writing the movie, and he would turn in different drafts, and I would give him my thoughts. Very slowly, over those months, our meetings started turning into dates. I was hesitant to tell him that I was developing feelings for him because this is my first producing job. I wanted to be professional! And here I am, falling in love with the writer". They married in July 2010. The wedding ceremony was officiated by their friend Jeff Probst, whom they met at a Primetime Emmy Awards party.

Fischer and Kirk announced her pregnancy with their first child in May 2011. The pregnancy coincided with her character's second pregnancy on The Office's eighth season. In September 2011, Fischer gave birth to their son. In May 2014, she gave birth to their second child, a daughter. During the engagement, Kirk made a cameo on The Office in the season six episode "The Delivery" as Clark, the male lactation consultant who examines Fischer's character, in March 2010.

Fischer is passionate about animal welfare, and is involved with the Los Angeles organizations Kitten Rescue and Rescue Rover. Before The Office, she did three years of hands-on rescue work for the two groups. She also regularly fosters cats and hosted Kitten Rescue's annual Fur Ball Gala in 2008, 2009, and 2010.

In October 2024, Fischer revealed she had been diagnosed with breast cancer a year earlier, but she was cancer-free after twelve rounds of chemotherapy, and three weeks of radiation therapy and lumpectomy. She also said that Angela Kinsey, her Office Ladies co-host, "protected" and "advocated" for her during their podcast recordings.

== Filmography ==
=== Film ===
List of films and roles
Year	Title	Role	Notes
1998	Channel 493	Rane	
1998	Born Champion	Wendy Miller	
2002	Les superficiales	Bitchy French Girl	Short film
2003	Doggie Tails, Vol. 1: Lucky's First Sleepover	Kelsey	Voice
2003	Melvin Goes to Dinner	Sister / Hostess	
2004	Employee of the Month	Whisper	
2004	The Women	Leslie	Short film
2004	LolliLove	Jenna Gunn	Also director/co-writer
2005	The 40-Year-Old Virgin	Woman #1	Uncredited
2006	Slither	Shelby	
2007	Blades of Glory	Katie Van Waldenberg	
2007	The Brothers Solomon	Michelle	
2007	Walk Hard: The Dewey Cox Story	Darlene Madison	
2008	The Promotion	Jen Stauber	
2009	Solitary Man	Susan Porter	
2010	A Little Help	Laura Pehlke	
2011	Hall Pass	Maggie Mills	
2012	The Giant Mechanical Man	Janice	Also producer
2013	Are You Here	Alli	
2014	Kiss Me	Vera	
2017	Brad's Status	Melanie Sloan	
2018	The 15:17 to Paris	Heidi Skarlatos	
2024	Mean Girls	Ms. Heron	
2025	Nimrods	Jodie	

=== Television ===
List of television appearances and roles
Year	Title	Role	Notes
2001	Undeclared	Betty / Sorority Girl	2 episodes
2001	Spin City	Waitress	Episode: "A Shot in the Dark: Part 2"
2002	Off Centre	Melanie	Episode: "The Backup"
2002	What I Like About You	Kim	Episode: "Copy That"
2003	Strong Medicine	Camille Freemont	Episode: "Maternal Mirrors"
2003	Miss Match	Connie	Episode: "Kate in Ex-tasy"
2004	Cold Case	Dottie (1943)	Episode: "Factory Girls"
2005	That '70s Show	Stacy Wanamaker	Episode: "Don't Lie to Me"
2005	Six Feet Under	Sharon Kinney	2 episodes
2005–2013	The Office	Pam Beesly	Main cast; 188 episodes Also producer (2012–2013)
2012	Dan Vs.	Amber (voice)	Episode: "Anger Management"
2014	Comedy Bang! Bang!	Herself	Episode: "Jenna Fischer Wears a Floral Blouse & Black Heels"
2015	Newsreaders	Kelly Spears	Episode: "The FMK Killer; Newsreaders: Behind the Scenes"
2015	You, Me and the Apocalypse	Rhonda MacNeil	Main cast; 10 episodes Also associate producer
2016	The Mysteries of Laura	Jennifer Lambert	Recurring role; 3 episodes
2016	The Grinder	Kelly	Episode: "Genesis"
2016	Drunk History	Katharine Wright Haskell	Episode: "Siblings"
2017	The Guest Book	Dr. Laurie Galiff	Episode: "Story Eight"
2018–2019	Splitting Up Together	Lena	Main cast
2024	Bluey Book Reads	Herself (voice)	Episode: "Charades"
2025–2026	The Chit Show	Bitsy Stout	9 episodes

== Awards and nominations ==
Year	Association	Category	Nominated work	Result
2004	St. Louis International Film Festival	Screen Actors Guild Emerging Actor Award	LolliLove	Won
2005	TromaDance Film Festival	Independent Soul Award (as director)	LolliLove	Won
2007	Primetime Emmy Award	Outstanding Supporting Actress in a Comedy Series	The Office	Nominated
2007	Screen Actors Guild Award	Outstanding Performance by an Ensemble in a Comedy Series	The Office	Won
2008	Screen Actors Guild Award	Outstanding Performance by an Ensemble in a Comedy Series	The Office	Won
2009	Teen Choice Award	Choice TV Actress – Comedy	The Office	Nominated
2009	Screen Actors Guild Award	Outstanding Performance by an Ensemble in a Comedy Series	The Office	Nominated
2010	Screen Actors Guild Award	Outstanding Performance by an Ensemble in a Comedy Series	The Office	Nominated
2010	St. Louis International Film Festival	Cinema St. Louis Award	Body of Work	Won
2011	Screen Actors Guild Award	Outstanding Performance by an Ensemble in a Comedy Series	The Office	Nominated
2012	Screen Actors Guild Award	Outstanding Performance by an Ensemble in a Comedy Series	The Office	Nominated
2013	Screen Actors Guild Award	Outstanding Performance by an Ensemble in a Comedy Series	The Office	Nominated
2020	Shorty Award	Best Podcaster (with Angela Kinsey)	Office Ladies	Nominated
