= Garden Party (The Office) =

- The Office episode
- Episode no.: Season 8 Episode 4
- Directed by: David Rogers
- Written by: Justin Spitzer
- Cinematography by: Matt Sohn
- Editing by: Rick Weis; David Rogers
- Production code: 804
- Original air date: October 13, 2011

Guest appearances
- Stephen Collins as Walter Bernard; Josh Groban as Walter Bernard, Jr.; Dee Wallace as Ellen Bernard

Episode chronology
← Previous "Lotto"	Next → "Spooked"
- The Office (American season 8)

"Garden Party" is the fourth episode of the eighth season of the American comedy television series The Office, and the show's 156th episode overall. The episode originally aired on NBC in the United States on October 13, 2011. It was written by co-executive producer Justin Spitzer and was directed by David Rogers and marks Mindy Kaling's first credit as executive producer. "Garden Party" features guest appearances from Josh Groban, Dee Wallace, and Stephen Collins.

The series—presented as if it were a real documentary—depicts the everyday lives of office employees in the Scranton, Pennsylvania, branch of the fictional Dunder Mifflin Paper Company. In the episode, Andy Bernard (Ed Helms) throws a garden party at Schrute Farms to impress Robert California (James Spader), with Bernard's parents and brother in attendance. Meanwhile, Dwight Schrute (Rainn Wilson) works to make it a classy event.

"Garden Party" features a substantial appearance by Josh Groban; Kaling had asked Groban if he could guest star in the series, through Twitter. The episode received mixed reviews from critics, with criticism towards its repetition of plot ideas. According to Nielsen Media Research, "Garden Party" drew more than 6 million viewers and received a 3.2 rating/8% share in the 18–49 demographic, staying even with the previous episode, "Lotto". It ranked third in its timeslot, and ranked as the highest-rated NBC series on Thursday.

== Synopsis ==
Andy Bernard decides to throw a garden party at Schrute Farms to impress his parents and Robert California, and exhaustively explains party manners to the office workers. Andy is jealous at the amount of attention his younger brother Walter Bernard, Jr. receives from his father, and thinks that by throwing an elaborate party he can ensure his father's blessings. At first, the party goes along smoothly. Andy makes a toast to Robert in order to get his fellow employees to toast him, as if to show to his parents and California that he is valued by his employees. His plan backfires, however, and instead more people toast Robert, and Robert's toast is about the easiness of the manager job. To get everybody's mind off of Robert, Andy decides to sing "More Than Words" as a duet with his father. This too goes awry as his father corrects his playing and singing, and ultimately decides to sing a duet with Walter Jr. instead of Andy. Upset, Andy takes his guitar and storms off.

His father confronts him privately about his outburst, and when Andy admits to trying to win his father's affection, he reacts with annoyance, harshly telling him that he is simply not proud of Andy's accomplishments, and is annoyed at Andy's attempts to gain his approval. This conversation is overheard by the other staff on the baby monitor Jim and Pam Halpert brought for their daughter, and Pam quickly turns off the monitor to let Andy save face. Darryl Philbin and Oscar Martinez confide to the camera that they now understand why Andy feels he needs to prove himself to everyone. After his family leaves, a dejected Andy, feeling unwanted by his family and co-workers, says goodbye to the office staff as they turn the garden party into a barbecue. Darryl and Oscar, however, convince Andy to stay with a cheeseburger and a beer.

Dwight Schrute wants to make the garden party a classy event to expand Schrute Farms' clientele. He thoroughly reads a book called The Ultimate Guide to Throwing A Garden Party that he bought online, actually written by Jim under the pseudonym "James Trickington". The book gives outlandish advice such as announcing each guest's name as they arrive in an extremely loud manner, imitating The Last Supper in a tableau vivant in the middle of a meal, dancing with his party staff, and a fire court dance as the closing ceremonies, all of which Dwight follows to the letter.

Pam feuds with co-worker Angela Lipton over baby names. Pam and Angela learn they've both chosen the name Phillip for their soon-to-be-born sons, with Pam naming her child after her deceased grandfather and Angela after her favorite cat. Angela, annoyed that Pam does not relinquish the name, makes a toast to "my son Phillip" at the garden party—only to have Pam make the same toast but describe in great detail how the name honors her grandfather. Angela, unwilling to reveal her feline-centric reasons for the name, simply grouses to the camera that Pam is always copying her.

Throughout the party, Kelly Kapoor keeps hinting at how cold she is, hoping Ryan Howard will offer his jacket. However, Ryan instantly offers his jacket to Robert, who is not even cold. Gabe Lewis also offers his, hinting at a rivalry between them in terms of sucking up to Robert, later evidenced in "Pool Party". Dwight's cousin Mose has fun being a valet, lining up the guests' cars in a field to perform a motorcycle stunt. However, he fails to get his motorcycle up the ramp, and instead runs across the tops of the cars, but is still satisfied.

== Production ==
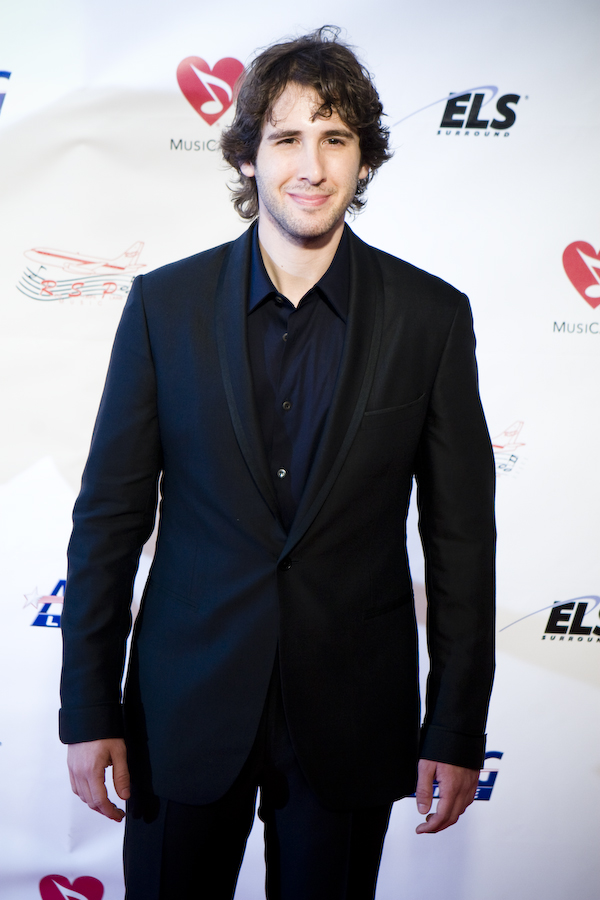
Josh Groban appeared as Andy's younger brother, Walter Bernard, Jr.

The episode was written by co-executive producer Justin Spitzer, his 10th writing credit for the series. It was directed by series editor David Rogers, his 4th directing credit for the series. Beginning with this episode, Mindy Kaling was promoted to executive producer. Before this, it was speculated that she might not return to the series as a writer. The episode features guest appearance from Stephen Collins, Dee Wallace and Josh Groban as Andy's father, mother and brother, respectively. Collins and Wallace were reported to appear on the series by Joyce Eng of TV Guide. Josh Groban was later reported to appear on the series the next day. Writer Mindy Kaling had sent Groban a message through Twitter asking if he would want to appear on the series. He responded yes with the filming week of the episode lining up with his Los Angeles concert for his Straight to You Tour.

== Reception ==
=== Ratings ===
In its original American broadcast on October 13, 2011, "Garden Party" was viewed by an estimated 6.050 million viewers and received a 3.2 rating/8% share among adults between the ages of 18 and 49. This means that it was seen by 3.2% of all 18- to 49-year-olds, and 8% of all 18- to 49-year-olds watching television at the time of the broadcast. Although seeing a 3.8% increase in viewership, the episode matched the 18–49 demo rating from the previous episode, "Lotto". The episode ranked third in its timeslot beating Person of Interest which received a 2.7 rating/7% share in the 18–49 demographic and The Secret Circle which received a 0.8 rating/2% share, but was defeated by Grey's Anatomy which received a 3.4 rating/9% share and The X Factor which received a 3.6 rating/10% share.

=== Reviews ===
The episode received mixed reviews from critics. HitFix writer Alan Sepinwall stated that the episode "offered more laughs than some of this season's other episodes". Despite this, he criticized the episode's main plot with Andy, commenting that "where giving Michael Scott power made him a funnier character than he would have been were he just another salesman, Andy has somehow become less funny since the promotion". Chris Plante of New York called the episode "funny, weird, touching, and unpredictable. A gem, really". National Post writer Barry Hertz compared the episode to "Booze Cruise", "Beach Games" and "The Search". M. Giant of Television Without Pity gave the episode a B−. Several critics praised the return of former Office writer, Michael Schur as Mose Schrute. Barry Hertz said that "the sight gag of him running atop a field of cars like a watered-down Evel Knievel was enough to give this episode an easy A".

Despite this, the episode received some negative reviews. The A.V. Club reviewer Myles McNutt was more negative towards the episode writing that "Here, we have a case where an episode could have signaled at least some sense of what else the show might be interested in other than Andy as the well-meaning but hapless boss and Pam and Angela's dueling pregnancies, and all we got were variations on those storylines with no new angle either narratively". He gave the episode a C. IGN writer Cindy White considered the episode superior to previous "external" episodes "Christening" and "Phyllis' Wedding", but considered it inferior to the "Niagara" and the "classic" "Booze Cruise". She criticized the main plot for rehashing previous plot lines and ultimately gave the episode a 7.0/10.
