= The Office characters =

The Office characters may refer to:

- List of The Office (American TV series) characters
- The Office (British TV series)#Characters
