= Phyllis' Wedding =

- The Office episode
- Episode no.: Season 3 Episode 16
- Directed by: Ken Whittingham
- Written by: Caroline Williams
- Cinematography by: Randall Einhorn
- Editing by: David Rogers
- Production code: 316
- Original air date: February 8, 2007
- Running time: 21 minutes

Guest appearances
- Creed Bratton as Creed Bratton; Rashida Jones as Karen Filippelli; George Ives as Uncle Al; Bobby Ray Shafer as Bob Vance

Episode chronology
← Previous "Ben Franklin"	Next → "Business School"
- The Office (American season 3)

"Phyllis' Wedding" is the sixteenth episode of the third season of the American comedy television series The Office and the show's 44th overall. It first aired on February 8, 2007, on NBC. The episode was written by staff writer Caroline Williams and directed by Ken Whittingham. Actors Creed Bratton, Rashida Jones, and Bobby Ray Shafer guest star.

The series depicts the everyday lives of office employees in the Scranton branch of the fictional Dunder Mifflin Paper Company. In this episode, the office attends Phyllis Lapin's (Phyllis Smith) wedding to Bob Vance (Shafer), and Pam Beesly (Jenna Fischer) becomes upset with how many similarities there are between her canceled wedding and Phyllis'. Meanwhile, Michael Scott (Steve Carell) embarrasses the bride and groom, and Pam reconnects with her ex-fiancé Roy Anderson (David Denman).

Brian Baumgartner's character appears as a drum player in the episode, forcing the actor to take lessons for the instrument and rely on a stunt musician. According to Nielsen Media Research, an estimated 8.8 million viewers watched the episode at the time of broadcast. It received mixed reviews from television critics, as some reviewers found Michael's actions unrealistic and cartoonish. "Phyllis' Wedding" won an NAACP Image Award for Whittingham's directional work and received a nomination from the Writers Guild of America.

== Plot ==
Phyllis Lapin has asked Michael Scott to push her father's wheelchair down the aisle at her wedding, a role that she gave him to secure six weeks off for her honeymoon. Michael is eager to participate, seeing himself in a "father of the bride" role, but is upset when Phyllis' father "upstages" him by walking the last few steps down the aisle under his own power.

Goaded by Jim Halpert, Dwight Schrute hunts down wedding crashers. He ousts Phyllis' Uncle Al, who fails to pass Dwight's questioning due to dementia. When Uncle Al is reported missing over the PA, Dwight realizes his mistake.

Michael makes several crude attempts to recapture the limelight, culminating with an overlong toast at the wedding banquet in which he impugns Phyllis' chastity. Outraged, Phyllis' husband Bob Vance throws him out of the reception hall. Dwight does not let him re-enter, taking satisfaction in being able to eject a real wedding crasher. Michael finds company with Uncle Al, and eventually confesses that he is sorry for his behavior and worried that it may have sullied Phyllis' day, although Uncle Al is only able to respond with aloof statements.

Pam Beesly is upset that many details of Phyllis' wedding, from the invitations to the wedding gown, were copied from her own canceled wedding, and is further rankled when her ex-fiancé Roy Anderson fails to recognize any of these details. Roy expresses regret over his lack of involvement in their wedding plans and pays "Scrantonicity", the Kevin Malone-led wedding band to play their song, "You Were Meant for Me". Touched by the gesture, Pam dances with him, and they leave together. Jim, who was flirting with Pam earlier in the reception, takes consolation in his relationship with Karen Filippelli. When Phyllis leaves the reception hall with Bob Vance, Michael apologizes to her and she thanks him for finding Uncle Al. The newlyweds ride off in a Vance Refrigeration van.

== Production ==
It's been really fun because it's given me the freedom to go, 'This is impossible, I don't drum — or quite frankly sing all that well, and certainly not way up where those guys are singing. So just let it go and rock out as well as Kevin can.'

— Brian Baumgartner on filming his musical scenes in the episode

"Phyllis' Wedding" was written by staff writer Caroline Williams and directed by Ken Whittingham, his fifth such credit for the series. Recurring guest stars Creed Bratton, Rashida Jones, and Bobby Ray Shafer appeared in the episode. The episode is the first of the series to revolve around a wedding. In an interview with Entertainment Weekly, Baumgartner described the episode, "Michael plays a very important role in that wedding. He is to walk Phyllis' dad down the aisle by pushing him in a wheelchair, which in his mind is him walking Phyllis down the aisle, a very important position of authority. Of course, Phyllis has asked him to do this only so she can get six weeks of vacation time. But for him it's a place of honor, and from there, things don't go quite the way that he hopes."

The episode features Kevin Malone playing the drums in a band, which had been an idea circulated since the first season, when allusions to him being in a Steve Miller tribute band were written; the scenes had to be removed from the series due to issues negotiating with the singer. The crew later decided to have Kevin be in a Police tribute band called Scrantonicity because he "talks so low, and has very little expression, and there is no band that sings higher and with more expression than the Police." While Kevin was always intended to be the band's lead singer, executive producer Greg Daniels approached Baumgartner about possibly playing an instrument, but the actor replied he could not play anything. Daniels and Baumgartner then discussed instruments that would be "funny" to play and brought up harmonicas, saxophones, and drums. They ultimately decided on the latter because they deemed a "drumming lead singer [to] be the funniest choice," regardless of the fact that the actor had "absolutely no drumming experience, and it's a difficult instrument."

However, in a 2021 episode of the Pardon My Take podcast, Baumgartner offered a different explanation for the choice of band and instrument: most songs by Sting and the Police are written so that the singing and drumming are not in sync, meaning that one would have to be a musical savant to drum and sing Police songs at the same time. Baumgartner noted that this detail added credibility to the fan theory that Kevin may secretly be a genius.

Baumgartner took some drum lessons, but found filming of the episode to be "the hardest thing that I've ever done artistically." He was aided by a stunt musician who hid behind a curtain near the band.

== Reception ==
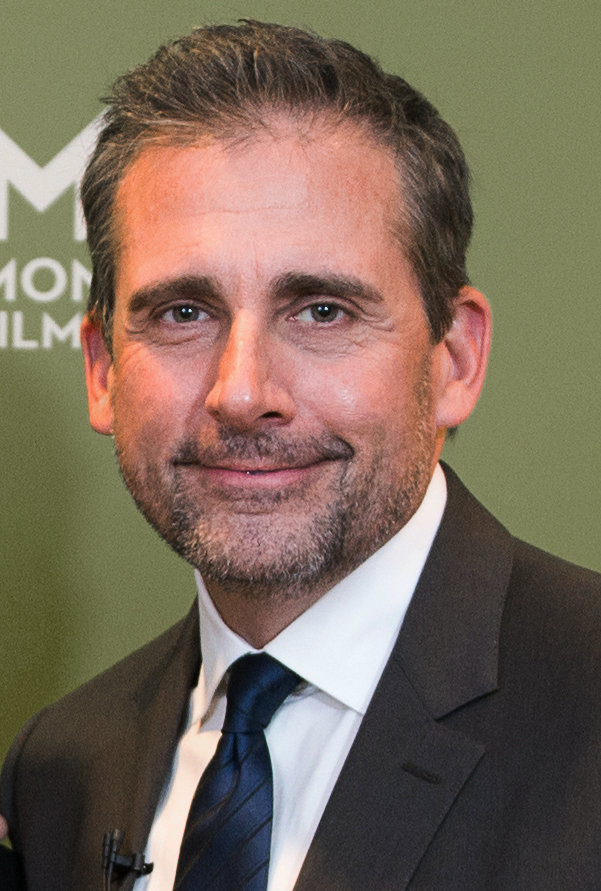
The behavior of Michael Scott (Steve Carell) during the wedding attracted mixed opinions from television critics, with one calling it "borderline ridiculous".

"Phyllis' Wedding" first aired on February 8, 2007, in the United States on NBC. According to Nielsen Media Research, an estimated 8.8 million viewers watched the episode, and it earned a 4.4/11 ratings share among adults aged 18 to 49. In other words, it was seen by 4.4 percent of all 18- to 49-year-olds, and 11 percent of all 18- to 49-year-olds watching television at the time of the broadcast.

AOL TV's Jay Black called the episode "amazing", partly because he believed the out-of-office setting made Michael's "social awkwardness and emotional neediness a lot more enjoyable." Black observed that the "main romantic plotline had some nice movement tonight as well," and praised the Pam-Roy and Jim-Karen storylines in particular for their realism. Writing for IGN, Brian Zoromski rated "Phyllis' Wedding" with 7 out of 10, an indication of a "good" episode. He asserted that the episode contained some "great moments" such as Jim's Altoid prank on Dwight and Michael's conversation with Phyllis' uncle with dementia. In contrast to Black however, Zoromski believed Michael's "over-the-top cartoonishness" actions stretched "the believability of the show's" illusion as reality, especially because they occurred outside of the office.

Give Me My Remote's Kath Skerry speculated that after several episodes of a "semi-normal" Michael, the writers "were aching to bring back cringe worthy Michael." She criticized the decision, calling his behavior "borderline ridiculous (and not in a good way). It just seems implausible that someone could be so very clueless that they would act like that in public." Skerry however did find high points, such as the opening sequence and any scene with Dwight and Angela. Television Without Pity graded the episode with an "A".

Entertainment Weekly columnist Abby West praised Smith for "again proving how sly her seemingly diffident character really is" by manipulating Michael. West also noted that she ended up "feel[ing] a little sorry" for Michael after the episode, due to the revelations learned from his childhood. Carell later recalled that many fans "hated" Michael for disrupting Phyllis' wedding. For his work in the episode, Whittingham won the NAACP Image Award for Outstanding Directing in a Comedy Series. Along with two other Office episodes, for her work on this episode, Caroline Williams was nominated for a Writers Guild of America Award for Best Screenplay – Episodic Comedy.
