= List of The Office (American TV series) characters =

The Office is an American television series based on the British television comedy of the same name. The format of the series is a parody of the fly on the wall documentary technique that intersperses traditional situation comedy segments with mock interviews with the show's characters, provides the audience access to the ongoing interior monologues for all of the main characters, as well as occasional insights into other characters within the show.

== Cast overview ==
Character	Portrayed by	Season								
Character	Portrayed by	1	2	3	4	5	6	7	8	9
Main characters
Michael Scott	Steve Carell	Main (Note: Until season 7 episode 22: "Goodbye, Michael")	Main	Main	Main	Main	Main	Main		Guest
Dwight Schrute	Rainn Wilson	Main	Main	Main	Main	Main	Main	Main	Main	Main
Jim Halpert	John Krasinski	Main	Main	Main	Main	Main	Main	Main	Main	Main
Pam Beesly	Jenna Fischer	Main	Main	Main	Main	Main	Main	Main	Main	Main
Ryan Howard	B. J. Novak	Main	Main	Main	Main	Main	Main	Main	Main	Starring (Note: Novak and Kaling are credited as guest stars in season 9 episode 1: "New Guys", and with the regular cast in season 9 episode 24: "Finale".)
Andy Bernard	Ed Helms			Starring (Note: Promoted to Starring in season 3 episode 19: "The Negotiation")	Starring	Starring	Main (Note: Promoted to Main in season 6 episode 15: "Sabre")	Main	Main	Main
Robert California	James Spader							Guest	Main	
Starring characters (Note: All starring cast members are credited as Mains in "Stress Relief" and "Finale")
Stanley Hudson	Leslie David Baker	Recurring	Starring (Note: Promoted to Starring in season 2 episode 13: "The Secret")	Starring	Starring	Starring	Starring	Starring	Starring	Starring
Kevin Malone	Brian Baumgartner	Recurring	Starring	Starring	Starring	Starring	Starring	Starring	Starring	Starring
Meredith Palmer	Kate Flannery	Recurring	Starring	Starring	Starring	Starring	Starring	Starring	Starring	Starring
Angela Martin	Angela Kinsey	Recurring	Starring	Starring	Starring	Starring	Starring	Starring	Starring	Starring
Oscar Martinez	Oscar Nunez	Recurring	Starring	Starring	Starring	Starring	Starring	Starring	Starring	Starring
Phyllis Lapin / Vance	Phyllis Smith	Recurring	Starring	Starring	Starring	Starring	Starring	Starring	Starring	Starring
Roy Anderson	David Denman	Recurring	Starring (Note: Promoted to Starring in season 2 episode 14: "The Carpet", until season 3 episode 19: "The Negotiation")	Starring		Guest		Guest		Guest
Jan Levinson	Melora Hardin	Recurring	Starring (Note: Promoted to Starring in season 2 episode 15: "Boys and Girls", until season 5 episode 4 "Baby Shower")	Starring	Starring	Starring		Guest		Guest
Kelly Kapoor	Mindy Kaling	Recurring	Recurring	Starring	Starring	Starring	Starring	Starring	Starring	Starring
Toby Flenderson	Paul Lieberstein	Recurring	Recurring	Starring	Starring	Starring	Starring	Starring	Starring	Starring
Creed Bratton	Creed Bratton	Recurring	Recurring	Recurring	Starring	Starring	Starring	Starring	Starring	Starring
Darryl Philbin	Craig Robinson	Recurring	Recurring	Recurring	Starring	Starring	Starring	Starring	Starring	Starring
Erin Hannon	Ellie Kemper					Recurring	Starring	Starring	Starring	Starring
Gabe Lewis	Zach Woods						Recurring	Starring	Starring	Guest
Holly Flax	Amy Ryan				Guest (Note: Credited as special guest star)	Recurring		Starring (Note: In episode 4: "Sex Ed"; between episode 11: "Classy Christmas" and episode 22: "Goodbye, Michael")		
Nellie Bertram	Catherine Tate							Guest	Starring (Note: From season 8 episode 15: "Tallahassee")	Starring
Clark Green	Clark Duke									Starring
Pete Miller	Jake Lacy									Starring
Supporting characters
Devon White	Devon Abner	Guest	Recurring							Guest
Lonny Collins	Patrice O'Neal	Guest	Guest	Guest						
Katy Moore	Amy Adams	Guest	Recurring							
Todd Packer	David Koechner	(Note: Portrayed by Toby Huss in an uncredited voice only appearance)	Recurring	Guest			Guest	Recurring	Recurring	Guest
Hank Tate	Hugh Dane		Recurring		Recurring	Guest	Recurring	Recurring	Recurring	Recurring
Carol Stills	Nancy Walls		Recurring	Recurring				Guest		Guest
Bob Vance	Bobby Ray Shafer		Guest	Recurring	Recurring	Recurring	Recurring	Recurring		Recurring
David Wallace	Andy Buckley		Guest	Recurring	Recurring	Recurring	Recurring		Recurring	Recurring
Mose Schrute	Michael Schur		Guest	Guest	Recurring	Guest	Guest	Guest	Guest	Recurring
Helene Beesly	Shannon Cochran		Guest							
Helene Beesly	Linda Purl						Recurring	Recurring		Guest (Note: Voice only)
Josh Porter	Charles Esten		Guest	Recurring						
Karen Filippelli	Rashida Jones			Recurring	Guest	Guest		Guest		
Nick	Nelson Franklin				Guest		Recurring			
Lynn	Lisa K. Wyatt					Recurring				
Charles Miner	Idris Elba					Recurring				
Isabel Poreba	Kelen Coleman						Recurring			
Matt	Sam Daly						Recurring			
Donna	Amy Pietz						Recurring	Guest		
Jo Bennet	Kathy Bates						Recurring	Recurring		
Robert Lipton	Jack Coleman							Recurring	Recurring	Recurring
Nate Nickerson	Mark Proksch							Recurring	Recurring	Recurring
Deangelo Vickers	Will Ferrell							Recurring		
Jordan Garfield	Cody Horn							Recurring		
Val Johnson	Ameenah Kaplan								Recurring	Recurring
Cathy Simms	Lindsey Broad								Recurring	
Jessica	Eleanor Seigler								Recurring	
Irene	Georgia Engel								Recurring	
Brian	Chris Diamantopoulos									Recurring
Zeke Schrute	Matt L. Jones									Recurring
Esther Bruegger	Nora Kirkpatrick									Recurring

== Regular cast ==
=== Michael Scott ===
Michael Gary Scott (Steve Carell) is the regional manager of Dunder Mifflin in Scranton, Pennsylvania. He is originally based on David Brent, his counterpart in the British version of The Office. However, Scott develops into a significantly different character from him as the series progresses.

Michael Scott departs the series during the seventh season; however he returns in the series finale to be a surprise guest at Dwight and Angela's wedding.

=== Dwight Schrute ===
Dwight Kurt Schrute III (Rainn Wilson) is a salesman at Dunder Mifflin and the assistant to the regional manager for the majority of the series, until he becomes regional manager in Season 9. The character is based on Gareth Keenan of the original British version of the show. He is the only character to both appear and have dialogue in every episode of the series.

=== Jim Halpert ===
James Duncan "Jim" Halpert (John Krasinski) is introduced as a sales representative at the Scranton branch of paper distribution company Dunder Mifflin, before temporarily transferring to the Stamford branch in the third season. Upon the merger of Scranton and Stamford branches, he becomes Assistant Regional Manager, and later co-manager alongside Michael Scott during the sixth season. The character is based on Tim Canterbury from the original version of The Office.

=== Pam Beesly ===
Pamela Morgan Halpert, née Beesly (Jenna Fischer). Her counterpart in the original British version of The Office is Dawn Tinsley. Pam begins the series as the receptionist at the paper distribution company Dunder Mifflin. Later on in the series, she becomes a sales representative and office administrator. She is the love interest of Jim Halpert, whom she later marries in season 6.

=== Ryan Howard ===
Ryan Bailey Howard (B. J. Novak), is based on the character of Ricky Howard from the original British version of The Office, as well as Neil Godwin during the fourth season. His role is expanded from the original British series to the extent that he's usually considered a main character.

Ryan Howard departs the series in the ninth-season premiere along with his love interest Kelly Kapoor; however, they both return in the series finale to be at Dwight and Angela's wedding.

=== Andy Bernard ===
Andrew Baines Bernard (Ed Helms) is introduced in season 3 as the Regional Director in Charge of Sales at the Stamford branch of paper distribution company, Dunder Mifflin when Jim Halpert transfers there. He becomes Regional Manager at the Scranton branch, courtesy of Robert California, in the eighth season following the departure of Michael Scott. He is an original character created for the series, with no counterpart in the British original series.

=== Robert California ===
Robert California (James Spader) is introduced in the seventh season after Michael Scott leaves his position as Regional Manager. In the eighth season, Robert managed to persuade Jo Bennett to appoint him CEO in her place. In the eighth-season finale, Robert departs from the company after David Wallace purchases Dunder Mifflin. He is an original character created for the series, with no counterpart in the British original series.

=== Stanley Hudson ===
Stanley Hudson (Leslie David Baker) is a sales representative at Dunder Mifflin. He is portrayed as a serious, perpetually grumpy and disgruntled employee. Stanley is known for working on crossword puzzles during work and the various staff meetings. He is also characterized by his general distaste for his job and life, with his ultimate goal being to retire, which he does during the series finale.

Stanley has generally good relations with most of his colleagues, especially Phyllis Vance, with whom he shares a desk cluster and often has lunch. However, Stanley dislikes his boss, Michael Scott, who often comments on Stanley's African American heritage and clientele. Stanley only thinly attempts to hide his disgust and disrespect for Michael, but rarely opposes him directly.

Stanley's second wife is Teri. He has two children from a previous marriage, including Melissa, who visits the office in "Take Your Daughter to Work Day". He is a diabetic. He is an original character created for the series, with no counterpart in the British original series.

In July 2020, Baker launched a Kickstarter campaign to fund the production of a pilot for Uncle Stan, a proposed spin-off series of The Office focusing on Stanley as he moves to Los Angeles, California to help his widowed nephew Lucky run his failing motorcycle repair/flower shop.

=== Kevin Malone ===
Kevin Malone (Brian Baumgartner) is a part of the accounting department at the Scranton branch of Dunder Mifflin. Kevin's counterpart in the British TV series is Keith Bishop, who shares Kevin's musical interest, obesity, and lack of communication skills.

=== Meredith Palmer ===
Meredith Palmer (portrayed by Kate Flannery, and Henriette Mantel in the pilot) is the socially inappropriate and sexually promiscuous representative at the Dunder Mifflin Scranton branch. In season 2, episode 15; season 8, episode 1; and season 9, episode 23, she is said to have the job of Supplier Relations; however, in the first season, her job was said to be an accountant. Her computer always displays the solitaire game found in the MS package. Little is known about her early and personal life, but, over the course of the series, some tidbits of information have been revealed. She has been married twice, with one of her ex-husbands leaving her for a woman who works as a garbage collector (who is addressed as "Mom" by Meredith's children). She has two children, a son named Jake (of whom she has custody) and a daughter named Wendy (described as "The good one") who is in the custody of one of Meredith's ex-husbands. Meredith is alleged to be an alcoholic, and it has been alluded to that she often arrives at work with a hangover, as she has complained that people talk too loudly and that the office lights are too bright in the morning. She is an original character created for the series, with no counterpart in the British original series.

=== Angela Martin ===
Angela Noelle Martin (Angela Kinsey) is introduced as the senior accountant, head of the Party Planning Committee, and safety officer at the Scranton branch of Dunder Mifflin. She is based on Sheila from the original British version of The Office. Her character serves as the stuck-up and more professional face of the branch. She begins a relationship with co-worker Dwight Schrute, whom she begins secretly dating in the second season, has a child with in the eighth, and marries in the ninth.

=== Oscar Martinez ===
Oscar Martinez (Oscar Nunez) is an accountant at the Scranton branch of Dunder Mifflin. He is a rational and efficient worker who is frequently exasperated by the antics of the office. He is the son of Mexican parents and is a gay man. In the Season 3 premiere, Michael Scott inadvertently outs him to his co-workers. He is based on Oliver from the original British version of The Office.

=== Phyllis Vance ===
Phyllis Vance (née Lapin) (Phyllis Smith) is a sales representative at the paper distributor Dunder Mifflin. She comes across as a quiet but friendly type who loves "girl talk" and gossip. But underneath her sweet, motherly exterior, she can sometimes be very vindictive and nasty, often to Angela Martin but sometimes even to someone as nice as Pam Halpert. She is often insulted and embarrassed by branch manager Michael Scott, who frequently describes her as non-feminine and old, despite having been classmates with her in high school.

=== Roy Anderson ===
Roy Anderson (portrayed by David Denman) is a warehouse dock worker at the Scranton branch of fictitious paper distributor Dunder Mifflin. He was engaged to the office receptionist Pam Beesly for three years when the series begins. He also had a good friendship with warehouse foreman Darryl Philbin and the other warehouse workers, and even has a mostly amicable relationship with Jim Halpert despite him being a rival for Pam's affections. He often shares in the warehouse's typical blue-collar humor. Although generally written as boorish, inconsiderate, and selfish, his character is somewhat less cruel and verbally abusive than his UK counterpart, Lee. After Pam breaks up with him for good in season 3, Roy is fired from Dunder Mifflin as he attacks Jim, but later makes amends with both Jim and Pam, encouraging the latter to pursue Jim. Roy later grabs drinks with Jim and other former coworkers during the season 5 episode "Crime Aid" and eventually gets married in "Roy's Wedding", having become a successful entrepreneur.

=== Toby Flenderson ===
Toby Flenderson (Paul Lieberstein) is the human resources (HR) representative for the Scranton branch of paper distributor Dunder Mifflin. Due to his position in HR, Toby reports directly to the corporate office, as opposed to the other branch employees who report to the Scranton branch manager, Michael Scott. As the HR rep, Toby has duties to ensure the company's procedures and rules of conduct are followed. As such, he is perceived as an enemy by the lead character Michael Scott – who constantly ignores company policies and rules of conduct in order to pursue fun and a personal relationship with his employees. A passive, soft-spoken character, Toby mostly has amicable relationships with his other coworkers, including Pam Beesly, on whom he has an unrequited crush. Toby is temporarily replaced by Holly Flax in season 5 after he moves to Costa Rica but returns after Holly is transferred. He is eventually fired by Dwight at the end of season 9 and becomes an author in New York City. He is an original character created for the series, with no counterpart in the British original series.

=== Kelly Kapoor ===
Kelly Rajanigandha Kapoor (Mindy Kaling) is the customer service representative at the Scranton branch of Dunder Mifflin. She is often romantically involved with Ryan Howard. Kelly departs the series in the ninth-season premiere along with her husband Ravi, a pediatrician. She returns in the series finale to be at Dwight and Angela's wedding. She is an original character created for the series, with no counterpart in the British original series.

=== Creed Bratton ===
Creed Bratton (Creed Bratton) is the elderly, eccentric quality assurance representative for the Scranton branch with a shady past. He is usually seen participating in suspicious activities, such as stealing poker chips in "Casino Night" or implicitly hiding evidence of violent crimes throughout the series. Creed also has a poor memory, often forgetting his coworkers' names and even his own job responsibilities, and is prone to telling outlandish stories with little certainty as to their veracity. Despite his bizarre behavior, he is tolerated by his coworkers. It is revealed in season 5 that his real name is William Schneider, and that he took the identity of "Creed Bratton" from someone who stole from him (and is implied to have been killed). In season 7, he becomes the temporary acting manager after Dwight accidentally discharges a firearm in the office. After the documentary airs, he fakes his own death, before it is finally revealed he was a wanted criminal. In the finale, he is found living in a closet at the office and he briefly sings a song for his coworkers before he is arrested for his crimes.

Creed believes that his blog URL is www.creedthoughts.gov.www\creedthoughts, but his "blog" is actually a Word document with the title expressly chosen to look like a URL, set up by Ryan Howard, wanting to "protect the world from being exposed to Creed's brain". Describing the content of the blog, Ryan says, "Even for the Internet, it's pretty shocking." NBC provided the character with an actual blog on the show's website.

=== Darryl Philbin ===
Darryl Philbin (Craig Robinson) is the warehouse foreman, later being moved by Jo Bennett to work in Jim's office after the latter's short tenure as co-manager. Among the warehouse employees, Darryl has the most prominent presence in the show and is friendly with most of the office personnel, becoming close friends with Andy Bernard in later seasons. He has a laid-back demeanor in social situations but takes his job seriously, especially in regard to safety, which Michael often disregards to Darryl's chagrin. During the final season, he quits his job at Dunder Mifflin to work for Athlead, a sports company that Jim founds. He also has a daughter named Jada, who he mentions throughout the series and is first seen in "Classy Christmas".

=== Gabe Lewis ===
Gabriel Susan Lewis (Zach Woods) is the Coordinating Director of Emerging Regions for the Sabre Corporate headquarters. In season 6, he is assigned to watch over the newly acquired Dunder Mifflin Scranton branch, during which he briefly dates Erin before she breaks up with him. At the end of the season, he is assigned back into Sabre's headquarters in Florida, but in the following season he still appears, initially without explanation. It is revealed in "Trivia" that Corporate made an illogical deal with the Scranton office, which would have Gabe be in Tallahassee three days a week and in Scranton for two, resulting in having to fly every night of the work week between the locations. As revealed in "Moving On", he was terminated from Sabre following the company's liquidation, but is hired back at the Scranton branch as the new Management Consultant by Regional Manager Andy Bernard in a gambit to make Erin uncomfortable after she broke up with him. An online feature on the series that was posted after the finale revealed that Gabe had been hired by a Chinese company that "rented out" Caucasians dressed as executives to Chinese companies so that the companies would have an in with Western firms, and that Gabe's job is to be "seen and not heard".

=== Clark Green ===
Clark Green (Clark Duke) is one of the new customer service representatives introduced in season 9 after Kelly quits. He is immediately given the office-moniker of "New Dwight" as he bears a passing resemblance to young Dwight. Dwight uses this and enlists Clark's help on a variety of sales posing as a father/son team. Including spending a week on vacation with Jan to close a sale to the Scranton whitepages. He is eventually hired by Dwight as a junior salesman after Dwight realizes none of his friends are qualified for the job.

=== Pete Miller ===
Pete Miller (Jake Lacy) is one of the new customer service representatives introduced in season 9 after Kelly quits. He is given the nickname "Plop" by Andy, much to the former's discomfort. He is initially called "New Jim" due to their similar appearances, though the two quickly realize that they have no common interests. After Erin breaks up with Andy, she and Pete start dating.

== Additional Dunder Mifflin and Sabre employees ==
=== Management ===
==== David Wallace ====
David Wallace (Andy Buckley) is the CFO and later CEO of Dunder Mifflin. Despite his differing lifestyle from the members of the Scranton branch, David tolerates and understands the eccentricities and flaws of Regional Manager Michael Scott, and appreciates employees Jim Halpert and Toby Flenderson. In the sixth season, he is laid off following the absorption of Dunder Mifflin by Sabre. He later sells his patent for a toy vacuum, called "Suck It", to the U.S. military for $20 million and later acquires Dunder Mifflin for an undisclosed sum of money and becomes CEO in the eighth-season finale, "Free Family Portrait Studio".

==== Deangelo Vickers ====
Deangelo Jeremitrius Vickers (Will Ferrell) was Michael's replacement as Regional Manager during the end of season 7, since Michael Scott was moving to Colorado with his fiancée, Holly. He appeared in Steve Carell's final three shows as a main cast member and then the first post-Michael Scott episode, "The Inner Circle". He is largely incompetent at filling Michael's position, as he has proven himself to be a biased manager, a terrible salesman, and a poor host of the annual Dundies award show. In "Goodbye, Michael", he reveals to Andy that he was not hired for his business experience, but because he helped prevent the theft of one of CEO Jo Bennett's dogs.

Deangelo is originally from Maine, and has an affinity for the American Southwest. Similarly to Toby, when he was a child, his mother divorced his father, and he was forced to choose between them. He has four children himself, including at least one boy, whom he seems to resent for an unknown reason. Deangelo was once morbidly obese, until he made a pact with himself to get into shape and lost 203 pounds (according to Michael in "Michael's Last Dundies" and to Deangelo himself in a deleted scene from "Training Day"; however, this conflicts with the NBC biography, which says Deangelo lost 176 lbs). Throughout "Goodbye, Michael", Deangelo starts to show signs of a nervous breakdown due to his desire to start eating junk food again. He later starts breaking down in front of the entire staff, during a farewell party for Michael, by sticking his hands into Michael's goodbye cake, and angrily yelling at it.

In his final episode, "The Inner Circle", after bragging about his ability to dunk a basketball, Jim calls him out on the matter, which leads to an accident requiring Deangelo's hospitalization and departure from Dunder Mifflin. At the end of the episode, it is implied that he has sustained brain damage, and is said in the subsequent episode to be in a coma. In "Lotto", he is referred to as being brain dead, but technically still alive.

Ferrell has previously appeared in several films with Carell, and with numerous other Office cast members, including Anchorman: The Legend of Ron Burgundy with Carell and David Koechner.

==== Jo Bennett ====
Joleen "Jo" Bennett (Kathy Bates) is the CEO of Sabre, the company that buys Dunder Mifflin in season 6. In season 8 she gives up the CEO position but remains chairman of the board. She is a forthright and stubborn Southern woman who has authored an autobiography titled Take A Good Look. She owns two harlequin Great Danes and a white Cadillac Escalade Hybrid; she is also a breast cancer survivor, a licensed pilot and a friend of Nancy Pelosi.

Jo first appears in a video chat in "Sabre" and in person in "The Manager and the Salesman", when she visits the Scranton office for the first time. On her last day in Scranton in "St. Patrick's Day", Darryl impresses her with an idea for improving shipping and she rewards him by giving him Jim's old office. That evening, when she's still working while the rest of the staff is desperate to leave and enjoy the holiday, she shows her respect for Michael after he tells her he's allowing his employees to leave. In "Whistleblower", the season finale, Jo comes to Scranton determined to find out who leaked information to the press about Sabre's printers catching on fire. She eventually zeroes in on Michael, who refuses to speak and brings him to her private airplane to get him to confess, but in reality, Jo is able to sense that Michael is going through a rough patch and the two have a heart-to-heart conversation. During the conversation, Michael volunteers to accept public responsibility for the scandal and speaks to the press. Jo thanks Michael and says that if there's anything he needs, she'll be happy to help, prompting Michael to joke about bringing Holly back to Scranton, to which Jo says "Let me see what I can do" (and Holly does return in season 7).

In season 7, following the departure of Michael and his replacement Deangelo Vickers, Jo makes Dwight the interim regional manager in "Dwight K. Schrute, (Acting) Manager", but replaces him with Creed (Scranton's most senior employee) after Dwight accidentally fires a gun in the office. She appears in "Search Committee" and reveals that she is old friends with one of the applicants for the manager job, Nellie Bertram. When Jo finds out about Gabe's current personal issues concerning Erin and Andy, she decides to transfer him back to the Florida headquarters. She also tells the committee to grant Dwight an interview, saying she likes "a little bit of crazy".

In the eighth-season premiere, "The List", Jim recounts to the camera crew how Robert California was hired as branch manager over the summer, but immediately quit, drove all the way to Sabre headquarters in Florida, and then convinced Jo to give him her position as the company's CEO (in reality, Bates left The Office due to her commitment to Harry's Law). However, Jo remains as chairman of the board, and Robert still refers to Jo as his boss. Later in season 8, Nellie Bertram re-appears, having been hired (off-screen) by Jo as Sabre's President of Special Projects. At the end of season 8, it is announced that Jo Bennett has sold Dunder Mifflin to David Wallace. Jo further plans to liquidate all of Sabre's assets, thereby effectively permanently dissolving the company.

==== Josh Porter ====
Joshua "Josh" Porter (Charles Esten) is the former Stamford Regional Manager. The character is first mentioned in the "Pilot", and makes his debut in "Valentine's Day". During his time as the Stamford manager, he is seemingly a more responsible and competent boss than Michael, being held in higher esteem by Jan Levinson, although it is often implied that Michael's branch is more productive than Josh's, and Michael is a more accomplished salesman. Josh becomes Jim's boss in Season 3 after Jim transfers to Stamford. Michael resents Josh due to his favored position in the company, and initially because he feels that Jim prefers Josh's friendship to his own.

In deleted scenes from the episode "The Convention", Josh states that he once spent time working in Israel, and also tells Dwight that he was once a member of the United States Coast Guard.

In "Branch Closing", when the Scranton branch is set to close, Josh is offered a promotion to become the manager of Dunder Mifflin's newly formed Northeast region. However, he leverages the offer to obtain a senior management job with Staples, throwing plans for the Scranton branch closing into disarray. As a result of Josh's maneuvering, the Stamford branch is closed instead. Disgusted, Jim later says of Josh's double-dealing, "Say what you will about Michael Scott – but he would never do that".

==== Charles Miner ====
Charles Miner (Idris Elba) appears in the fifth season, as the Vice President of Northeast Sales for Dunder Mifflin, the position vacated by Ryan and Jan. Before coming to Dunder Mifflin, he was employed by Saticoy Steel, and came from an accounting background. He is introduced in the episode "New Boss", where his no-nonsense management style clashes with Michael's laid-back demeanor and Jim's tomfoolery. His handsome appearance and firm attitude causes both Angela and Kelly to develop an attraction to him. Michael quits after Charles cancels a party celebrating Michael's 15th anniversary with the company, and Charles takes over management of the branch until a permanent replacement for Michael can be found. Charles repeatedly expresses contempt for Jim and also lets Dwight know that he is impressed by his work and plans to give him more to do. In "Broke", fretful over Michael's new company poaching several clients, Charles meets with Jim, Dwight, and David Wallace at the branch. Charles tries to have Jim barred from the meeting, referring to him as "a disappointment" and giving more credence to Dwight. During negotiations with Michael, Michael demands that Charles be fired, but David refuses, stating that Charles is "valuable". Michael is reinstated as branch manager, so Charles, being no longer needed in Scranton, returns to corporate headquarters. Upon his departure, his attempt to give a parting speech is coldly shut down by Michael. Charles reappears in "Company Picnic", where he is again condescending to Jim and heavily competitive in the volleyball game against the Scranton branch.

Charles's fate following the purchase by Sabre is ambiguous; in "Secret Santa", David explicitly says that the only ones losing their jobs as a result of the buyout are David himself, Alan Brand, and "some other executives who [the employees at Dunder Mifflin Scranton] don't know", implying that Charles will be kept on, but "The Banker" states that all of the corporate staff were let go when Sabre purchased Dunder Mifflin. One possible explanation is that Charles left Dunder Mifflin some time before the buyout. Alternatively, Sabre's disposition towards retaining the executives may have changed after David's statement in "Secret Santa". In "Viewing Party", when Michael is listing his former bosses, he says, "Charles was fired." However, given his hostile attitude towards Charles, this may simply be Michael creatively reinterpreting the resolution of the conflict between Dunder Mifflin and the Michael Scott Paper Company.

Idris Elba was the second former cast member of the HBO drama The Wire, after Amy Ryan, to be hired for a recurring role on The Office.

==== Ed Truck ====
Edward "Ed" Truck (Ken Howard) was the former Regional Manager of the Dunder Mifflin Scranton branch, for whom Michael worked until Ed retired. He was responsible for hiring Creed, Phyllis, and Darryl, as well as ending the mandatory retirement age that the company instituted, by filing an age discrimination lawsuit. In the episode "The Carpet", Michael believes that the fecal matter left on his office carpet was left there because he is disliked by his employees. He tricks Truck into meeting with him (by claiming that they need to discuss his pension), and asks for his opinions on the situation. As Ed reveals, someone had defecated on his office carpet, as well, and his advice to Michael is "Why can't you just let your workers be your workers, your friends be your friends, and your family be your family?" (the joke here is that Michael has no real friends or family, and his employees serve as reluctant surrogates).

In "Grief Counseling", Jan informs Michael that Ed has recently died. While he is surprised at the news, Michael does not appear to mourn Ed's death, until Creed informs him of the gruesome way Ed had died: He was apparently "drunk as a skunk", and driving on Route 6, when he managed to go under an 18-wheeler, decapitating himself. Michael soon expresses feelings of extreme remorse, and he requests that a statue of Ed be erected in his memory, but Jan nixes the suggestion, stating that corporate would not like it. As a compromise, there is a plaque honoring him, which hangs between Michael's office and the Conference room.

==== Dan Gore ====
Dan Gore (Dan Cole) is the Regional Manager of the Buffalo branch. He was first introduced in "Valentine's Day" attending the meeting with the new CFO, David Wallace. He also attended Wallace's cocktail party in "Cocktails", and was seen in "Launch Party" trying to see if his branch's camera was working. He was one of the company leaders who attended Ryan's wilderness retreat, along with Toby (and not the pointedly un-invited Michael Scott). It is announced in "Company Picnic" that the Buffalo branch is closing due to the terrible recession hitting the U.S. economy.

==== Craig ====
Craig (Craig Anton) is the incompetent, boorish Manager of the Albany branch who appears in "Valentine's Day". He resents Jan, and his relationship with Michael is soured when they argue over their opinions of Jan. Craig tries to save face by leaking Michael's relationship between the two in front of David Wallace. Michael later jokes that Craig "is not the sharpest tool in the shed" in an attempt to defend Jan.

In "Survivor Man", Craig is not invited on Ryan's Regional Manager retreat or otherwise mentioned, possibly meaning that he no longer works in that position. In a deleted scene from "Stress Relief", it is mentioned that the Albany branch is closing, which confirms that Craig has been fired from the company.

==== Troy Underbridge ====
Troy L. Underbridge (Noel Petok) is a corporate executive who works in banking, and is notorious for encouraging Ryan's partying and cocaine abuse. Due to his short height, Dwight is convinced that he is actually a hobbit. Troy first appears in "The Deposition", and reappears, with a more pivotal role, in the episode "Night Out". In a deleted scene, from "Goodbye, Toby", he arrives at the Scranton branch, but is reluctant to reveal why he came instead of Ryan; Jim is eager to deliver an unfriendly message to Ryan via Troy, but Troy says that he now reports to Wallace instead of Ryan, and Jim asks "What is going on?". After the YouTube video of Ryan being arrested for fraud is discovered, Troy is asked if he has any information on the arrest, but merely states, "Maybe I do". He is later seen in Michael's film, Threat Level Midnight, in the episode of the same name, playing one of Goldenface's henchmen. His middle initial is revealed on the Threat Level Midnight website, which is supposed to be read like "troll under bridge".

Since he worked for the Dunder Mifflin corporate office, it is presumed that he was fired from the company, along with all of the other corporate executives, after Dunder Mifflin was bought out by Sabre. However, Troy later resurfaces in "Junior Salesman" as one of the bizarro job applicants applying for a part-time sales position at the Scranton branch. Troy exhibits strange behavior along with the rest of the group, such as shotgunning a soda during lunch. He is later seen in a group paintball photo, raising the finger to Dwight when it's revealed that Dwight's interviewing of the applicants was just a ruse to keep Clark from getting the job and joining them in letting Dwight know they permanently hated him.

=== Sales ===
==== Karen Filippelli ====
Karen Filippelli (Rashida Jones) is introduced as a sales representative at the Stamford branch of Dunder Mifflin, before moving to the Scranton branch as part of a merger. During this time, she also dates Jim Halpert (John Krasinski), another salesman. In the third season finale, she and Jim both travel to New York to interview for a job at corporate. Neither of them get the job and she soon leaves Jim and Scranton. Later, she is seen as the regional manager of the Utica branch where she is eight months pregnant. She also marries a dermatologist named Dan (Dan Goor). Her character is based on Rachel from the original version of The Office.

In an article titled "The Office's Best Characters, Ranked" published on MSN, Karen was ranked seventeenth. The article described her as "...Clever, ambitious employee whose only mistake was dating Jim and therefore stepping in front of the unstoppable Jim-and-Pam love locomotive." An article entitled "The Office: 5 Female characters Who Got the Respect They Deserved (& 5 Who Didn't)" published on Screen Rant said "There was nothing wrong with Karen, and, in many ways, she was a good match for Jim."

==== Danny Cordray ====
Danny Cordray (Timothy Olyphant) is a traveling salesman of Dunder Mifflin and former rival salesman of the company. He is introduced in "The Sting", where, after stealing a potential client, Michael, Dwight and Jim set up an in-building sting to copy his skills as a salesman, but Danny eventually discovers the operation. While he is initially angry with them, he decides to accept Michael's job offer. In "Costume Contest", he impresses his fellow employees by inviting them all to a Halloween party at Public School, the bar he owns. When Jim discovers that Danny briefly dated Pam, while he was in Stamford, Jim pesters Danny to reveal why he did not call her back, and he eventually admits that he found Pam "kind of dorky", something which bothers Jim more than it does Pam. He is found to be very attractive by many members of the office, including Meredith who tries to seduce him. In "Michael's Last Dundies", he wins the "Hottest in The Office" Dundie, defeating reigning champ Ryan, and appeared in a deleted scene, accepting his award from pre-recorded footage.

==== A.J. ====
A.J. (Rob Huebel) is an affable salesman at the Nashua branch who becomes Holly's boyfriend after she's transferred there from Scranton and breaks off her relationship with Michael. Michael meets him on his Lecture Circuit and becomes devastated when he learns Holly is dating him. Michael awkwardly calls out A.J. during his presentation about Holly, but A.J. doesn't react. He is seen again at the Company Picnic along with Holly, whom he is still dating. A.J. tells Michael they've started designing a house for themselves. Michael makes a number of joking insults at A.J., who doesn't respond to them. After Michael and Holly's disastrous presentation, coupled with the obvious affection the two still have for each other, Michael maturely lets Holly leave with A.J. as he is not going to force anything to happen between them. After Holly is temporarily transferred back to Scranton in season 7, she reveals to other women in the office that she and A.J. are going through problems and that she is upset that he has not proposed to her yet. At their suggestion she decides to give A.J an ultimatum to either propose to her by New Year's or end their relationship. A.J. surprises Holly at the office Christmas party in "Classy Christmas". In "Ultimatum", Holly returns to work and reveals that A.J. did not propose to her, but she has decided to continue dating him anyway. However, she soon becomes upset that she did not follow through with the ultimatum and calls A.J. to say she wants a break between them. Soon after she ends their relationship and begins dating Michael again.

==== Ben Nugent ====
Ben Nugent (voiced by writer Lester Lewis) is the top salesman at the Utica branch, whom Michael calls and unsuccessfully attempts to poach, in the episode "Branch Wars". The character's name was based on a real-life writer who was dating Mindy Kaling when the episode was produced.

==== Todd Packer ====
Todd Packer (David Koechner), based on Chris Finch of the British version, is the boorish, alcoholic and sexually promiscuous Outside Sales Representative, who tells obscene, disrespectful jokes, which tend to offend everyone except Michael. He is first heard over a phone call in the pilot episode, while his first physical appearance is in the season 2 episode "Sexual Harassment". In the season 7 episode "Todd Packer", he applies for a desk job at the Scranton branch, much to the consternation of the staff save Michael. Jim and Dwight scheme to get rid of him by pretending that Sabre is offering a job in Tallahassee, Florida, which he accepts. When Michael learns of the deception, he plans to tell Packer, but when Packer insults Holly he changes his mind, finally coming to share the others' view that Packer is "an ass". In the season 8 episode "Tallahassee", it is revealed that Packer actually got a position at Sabre's Tallahassee office, where he is being employed as part of Nellie Bertram's special project team. However, he was fired shortly after when Jim managed to stall Dwight from presenting the Sabre store project to the board, prompting Packer to volunteer for the VP position, receiving the termination that was destined for Dwight. He made a return appearance in Season 9 in order to pretend to be making amends for his terrible behavior by handing out gourmet cupcakes to his former co-workers, when he had really laced the goodies with a wide variety of noxious substances and was pleased he'd be causing the people who fired him some serious discomfort.

=== Administrative assistants ===
==== Cathy Simms ====
Cathy Simms (Lindsey Broad) is the young and attractive temporary office worker who was filling in for Pam while she was on her maternity leave. It is later revealed her ethics are questionable. She remained employed at the company for a short period of time after Pam returned.

During her time at the office, Cathy maintained a fairly inconspicuous presence, and while the members of the staff who bothered to pay her any heed often maligned or trifled her (Dwight in particular), she was able to find common ground with Jim, with whom she developed a rapport. However, in "Pool Party", there are subtle implications to suggest that her feelings towards him are more than platonic. Her infatuation with him is ultimately confirmed at the end of "Special Project", when, after being selected to travel for a three-week business trip to Florida with Jim and four others, she privately informs a friend, via her cell phone, of her intentions to seduce Jim, despite his marriage and children. In a deleted scene from the same episode, she also worries about losing her job, now that Pam has returned, and implies that, in the future, she might be desperate enough to consider marrying a man she knows, named Doug, just for the financial stability he could provide.

In "After Hours", Cathy puts her plan to seduce Jim into action. She shows up at his hotel room, in rather skimpy leisure wear, claiming that the hotel maintenance crew is working in her room. While Jim initially agrees to her request to stay with him for a while, he becomes increasingly uncomfortable with her presence, especially after she uses his shower and reappears in a short robe. After she shows off her legs to him, Jim finally tells her that he is happily married and not interested in her. In response, Cathy feigns shock and tells him that she had no romantic intentions whatsoever. Embarrassed for apparently having misread the situation, he apologizes and agrees to relax. However, when he returns from the bathroom, and finds her lying under his covers with the robe on the floor, he firmly demands that she leave, despite her protests. Dwight then bursts in with chemicals to spray for bed bugs, and Jim tells him a bug is following Cathy. Dwight proceeds to chase her from the room, while Jim enjoys her distress.

In a deleted scene from the next episode, she is upset that Jim is now acting awkwardly around her, though a talking-head interview shows that she is still under the delusion that she has a chance at a romantic relationship with him. In a subsequent interview with the object of her affection, Jim tells the camera crew that he thinks she is "crazy". However, in "Last Day in Florida", it appears that she may no longer care for Jim, as she laughs along with Dwight when Dwight repeatedly insults him (although, it is also possible that she was only doing this because Dwight was vice president to Nellie Bertram at the time). She is not shown returning from Florida with her co-workers, and in the next episode, her desk appears to be cleaned out. On March 19, 2012, Broad confirmed that Cathy would not be returning, stating, via a Twitter message, that "Cathy has finished [temping] at Dunder Mifflin".

==== Hunter ====
Hunter (Nicholas D'Agosto) was Jan's assistant. He first appeared in the episode "The Negotiation", during which he causes Michael to feel threatened by his youthful good looks. In "Women's Appreciation", Hunter listened in on a sensitive phone conversation between Michael and Jan, and Jan tells Michael to tell Hunter if he is visiting her that night, so he can purchase more vodka. He makes another appearance in "The Job", in which he is made uncomfortable by Michael, when he asks him to tell Jan that "[He] want[s] to squeeze them". After receiving her termination, Jan wishes Hunter luck with his band, and tells him, "Don't let them change you". In "Dinner Party", it is revealed that Ryan fired Hunter not long afterwards (perhaps for his complicity in Jan's negligence of her job); however, Hunter has since released a CD with his band, The Hunted, implying he may have taken up a career as a musician. The lyrics to one of the songs, entitled "That One Night", as well as Jan's behavior when she listens to it, seems to imply Hunter may have had sex with Jan, and quite possibly lost his virginity to her. On Jan's website, "serenitybyjancandles.com", she lists one candle as "Hunter Green", and writes, "This youthful, firm scent will leave your mouth watering. While designing this candle I felt like a college girl again. Just as Eve was tempted by a decadent apple, you'll be tempted by the most erotic scent of my collection, 'Hunter Green'", further implying a sexual relationship between them. In the Season 9 episode "The Whale", we learn that Hunter was 17 when he worked for Jan.

==== Rolando ====
Rolando (Adam Jamal Craig) is the receptionist at the Dunder Mifflin, Utica branch. He first appears in "Branch Wars", and reappears in "Lecture Circuit", in which he greets Michael and Pam when they arrive at the Utica branch, and also scoffs at Michael's suggestion that the two receptionists go on a "friend date".

==== Stephanie ====
Stephanie (Laurel Coppock) is a friendly receptionist at Sabre Headquarters, who appears in the eighth-season episode, "Trivia". When Dwight physically apprehends Gabe, because he mockingly rejected Dwight's pitch, Stephanie ignores Gabe's cries for help, allowing Dwight to continue harassing him, uninterrupted.

==== Jordan Garfield ====
Jordan Garfield (Cody Horn) was the new executive assistant hired by Deangelo Vickers in "The Inner Circle", mainly to prove to the staff that he was not sexist. She had no business background, leaving her co-workers to assume Deangelo hired her because of her model-level looks. In "Dwight K. Schrute, (Acting) Manager", Dwight informs her that her co-workers think of her as a joke because she was only hired due to her looks; she appears irritated but not particularly surprised. She never laughs, except in a deleted scene, where her behavior when she talks to the camera crew about one of Jim's pranks implies that she is not used to admitting she thinks anything is funny.

Jordan is not seen in the eighth season, with no explanation of what became of her. Paul Lieberstein later confirmed that she would not return to the show, but did not explain why.

==== Ronni ====
Ronni (Dale Raoul) was Pam's temporary replacement as receptionist, hired when Pam went to art school in New York City in the episode "Weight Loss". During her short time at the office, Ronni quickly grew unpopular; Michael was openly unappreciative of her and, during an office party, her question "does anyone want to dance?" was met with unanimous disgust. Michael later fired her and replaced her with Ryan, partly because Michael had felt she was "boring". She later makes a cameo in the episode "Shareholder Meeting", in a flashback.

=== Warehouse employees ===
==== Lonny Collins ====
Lonnis "Lonny" Collins (Patrice O'Neal) is a dock worker. Lonny joins his friend Darryl in open displays of irritation by and intimidation toward Michael. He became a vocal supporter of Darryl in trying to establish a union, citing the low pay they receive in comparison to the office employees. He is best known for yelling at Michael after Michael trashed the entire warehouse. He also insulted Michael in front of the staff during Darryl's safety training seminar, after Michael frequently interrupted the presentation with his obnoxiousness, and made fun of Michael anew during the office staff's own workplace safety lecture. Kelly insults him, referring to him as "Sea Monster" because he is overweight.

==== Madge Madsen ====
Madge Madsen (Karly Rothenberg) is a dock worker. Madge is a warehouse employee who played against the office team during the "Basketball" game (which led to Michael's crude reference to her as "the East German gal"). When Michael led the male office workers into the warehouse for some "guy time", Madge excused herself from the proceedings. Initially Michael did not understand why she was leaving, indicating that he had not realized that she was a woman. Michael mistook her name by calling her "Pudge" and later "Padge", not knowing her real name. Michael and Dwight stole her uniform when heading out to prank the Utica branch during "Branch Wars", and Jim ended up wearing it during the whole fiasco. Madge makes a brief appearance in "Heavy Competition" when Dwight mistakes her for Michael as she walked by him. In "Secret Santa", it is revealed that the warehouse employees refer to her as "Garfield" for her affection for lasagna. In "Costume Contest", after the warehouse workers are allowed to make sales, it is said that Madge had made her first sale. When she and the rest of the warehouse employees win nearly a million dollars in a winning lottery ticket during "Lotto", Madge quits her job on the spot.

==== Glenn ====
Glenn (Calvin Tenner) is a dock worker. He first appears in "Sexual Harassment", where he watches a sexual harassment video sent from corporate, and reappears in "Boys and Girls", when Michael holds a seminar in the Warehouse for all the male staff members. In "Grief Counseling", after Michael holds a funeral for a deceased bird (which, in truth, represents his grief for the recent passing of his former boss, Ed Truck), and the bird's makeshift "coffin" is let afire, Dwight orders Glenn and Phillip to clean up the burned ashes. In the fourth-season premiere, he participates in Michael's Fun Run for Rabies, and appears to have been the second person to cross the finish line. In "Weight Loss, Andy Bernard spits on his shoe before a weigh-in. In "Secret Santa", he attends the office Christmas party, and in "St. Patrick's Day", he tells Darryl to go back to his office in the Warehouse. In "The Cover Up", he is seen talking to Darryl in his office, where Darryl tells him "Look, I'm not down there anymore, so if the guys start making fun of you, you gotta' start standing up for yourself". In "Lotto", he quit his job, along with the rest of the Warehouse crew, when they win the lottery. He also moons the Scranton branch employees when the Warehouse staff runs wild in the office after receiving the news of their winnings. Both he and Hide invest their winnings in an energy drink for Asian homosexuals, which ultimately loses all their money, resulting in the two begging Darryl for their jobs back in "Free Family Portrait Studio". He later appears in "Lice" with his nametag now saying Glenn.

In his early appearances, the character's nametag read Lester, although this was changed in later episodes.

==== Jerry DiCanio ====
Jerry DiCanio (Matt DeCaro) is an older dock worker. In the episode "Basketball", Michael, knowing that his team is winning, claims that Jerry's inadvertent elbow hit to Michael's face is an intentional foul. Michael then declares that their "friendly" game has led to violence, and abruptly ends the game, declaring his team the winner. Nearly a decade later, in the ninth-season episode "Work Bus", it is mentioned that Jerry has died.

==== Phillip ====
Phillip (Phillip Pickard) is another older dock worker. He first appears in "Basketball", and is later seen in "The Alliance". He is present when Michael holds a seminar in the Warehouse for all the male staff members, in "Boys and Girls", and is also present at the Warehouse during "Casino Night". In "Grief Counseling", after Michael holds a funeral for a deceased bird, and the bird's makeshift "coffin" is let afire, Dwight orders Philip and Glenn to clean up the burned ashes. He later appears in a deleted scene in "The Merger", is also present at Bob Vance's bachelor party in the Warehouse in the episode "Ben Franklin", and also attends the inventory party in "Back from Vacation". Phillip is last seen in "Safety Training", attending the Warehouse and office safety seminars.

==== Michael ====
Michael (Lamont Ferrell) is a dock worker who once gave Michael Scott a ride home, getting stuck for an hour in traffic, only to find that Michael had forgotten his name the following week in "Stress Relief".

==== Matt ====
Matt (Sam Daly) works at the Dunder Mifflin warehouse. It is presumed that he started work there shortly before December 2009. It is revealed in "Secret Santa" that Oscar secretly has a crush on him, and that Matt is also gay. Pam spends the whole Christmas party trying to get Oscar and Matt to bond. In the episode "Happy Hour", Oscar invites the warehouse crew and the office to drinks in an effort to hang out with Matt. The only real interaction between the two is when Matt invites Oscar to play basketball with him which Oscar gladly accepts despite the fact that he is terrible at basketball, confirming Darryl's accurate impression that Matt has nothing in common with Oscar. After that point, Matt does not appear in the show anymore.

==== Hidetoshi Hasagawa ====
Hidetoshi "Hide" Hasagawa (Hidetoshi Imura) is a Japanese warehouse dock worker. He is first seen in the first-season episode "Basketball", and is subsequently introduced to the camera crew by Darryl in the sixth-season episode "Happy Hour".

Hide claims that he was once a heart surgeon in Japan, and he boasts that he was "the best" due to his steady hands. He performed surgery for a yakuza boss, who needed a new heart. However, the Yakuza boss died during the operation. Hide fled from the Yakuza, hid in a fishing boat, and escaped to America, where Darryl hired him and "save[d his] life". Hide later reveals that he killed the yakuza boss on purpose.

In "Body Language", with Dwight's help, he applies for Sabre's minority executive training program, but he loses the position to Kelly.

In "Lotto", Hide is one of the warehouse employees who share a million-dollar winning lottery ticket. Triumphant, he immediately quits his job. Glum, Darryl hires new warehouse staff to replace those who quit, and he jealously wonders how the former warehouse staff will invest their winnings. Darryl muses that Hide will use his money to make a drink for Asian homosexuals.

In "Free Family Portrait Studio", Hide and Glenn lose their winnings after their energy drink investment fails, and they beg Darryl for their former jobs. In the season 9 episode "The Target", Hide makes a brief appearance impatiently watching and ridiculing Pam as she paints her warehouse mural.

==== Gary Trundell ====
Gary Trundell is a former warehouse worker that left prior to the start of the series. It is revealed in "Branch Closing" that he agreed to sleep with Meredith on the last day of work.

==== Val Johnson ====
Val Johnson (Ameenah Kaplan) is a new Warehouse worker, first appearing as an applicant in the episode "Lotto". In "Doomsday", both Gabe and Darryl develop attractions to her; when Gabe asks her out, she politely declines and tells him that she does not date co-workers, causing Darryl to decide not to pursue her as more than a friend. In "Pam's Replacement", she compliments Andy, Darryl and Kevin's band, and later helps them realize that Robert California and his friends have ousted them out of their original band. In "Christmas Wishes", Darryl invites her to the office Christmas Party. However, she arrives formally dressed, having misunderstood Darryl's statement about the dress code. While she is embarrassed, Darryl convinces her to stay by dressing in a tuxedo. In "Special Project", she knits Darryl a hat for a Valentine's Day gift. Darryl believes this to be a sign of affection, but later discovers that she knitted a hat for everyone in the warehouse. Later in the episode, Val lies to Darryl and tries to convince him that her mother got her a vase of flowers, but Darryl earlier had discovered that it was her boyfriend that sent them. This then convinces Darryl that the hat is a "beanie of love". In "After Hours", Brandon, Val's boyfriend, arrives at the Scranton branch, and accuses Darryl of having an affair with his girlfriend, after having read Darryl's text messages to her. After reading his text messages aloud, everyone agrees that his text messages are suggestive of Darryl wanting to be with Val, but both of them brush it off as being ridiculous. When they are alone, however, Darryl tells Val that a potential relationship is not ridiculous, leaving her shocked. In the eighth-season finale, "Free Family Portrait Studio", Darryl declares to Val and Brandon that he is officially pursuing her. While Brandon insults Darryl for this, Val looks impressed by Darryl's bravado. Later, when Darryl is having his portrait taken with his daughter, Jada, he invites Val to be in the picture. She joins them, and affectionately grabs Darryl's hand. Their relationship is continuing in Season 9, with Val accompanying Darryl to the early-morning weekday wedding of his former co-worker Roy.

==== Nate Nickerson ====
Nate N. Nickerson (Mark Proksch) is a dimwitted, but well-meaning, warehouse worker, who used to be Dwight's handyman. He is introduced in the opening to the season 7 episode "Sex Ed", when Dwight hires him from a group of undocumented immigrant day laborers and has him remove a hornet's nest from the Dunder Mifflin parking lot (which he attempts to do using a blowtorch and then a baseball bat, leading to him getting severely stung). Nate responds to Dwight in very broken Spanish when the two first meet, though later on, he seems to have become more fluent when he translates for Dwight in "Jury Duty". In "WUPHF.com", he helps Dwight run the Hay Place attraction in the parking lot. In "China", he helps Dwight turn the office toilet paper to half-ply as a cost-cutting measure, and goes with him to check out the "new building" that Pam claims to have found. In the opening of "Classy Christmas", he takes the staff Christmas photo. Nate re-appears in the season 8 episode "Lotto", where he applies for a warehouse position with Dunder Mifflin after the rest of the warehouse staff quits. It is revealed in this episode that "while he does not technically have a hearing problem, sometimes when many sounds are occurring at once, he hears them as one big jumble". He is seen working in the warehouse in "Doomsday". He also appears in several episodes in season 9, including the series finale, though part of his performance in episode 9, "Dwight Christmas" was removed for containing blackface, in 2020.

==== Gideon ====
Gideon (Michael Daniel Cassady) is a part-time dock worker. He first appears in "Lotto", as an applicant for a position in the Warehouse, which he was eventually hired for, and reappears in the episode "Doomsday". As mentioned in his debut episode, he has a PhD, and is studying North America's diminishing blue collar workforce. Aside from his job at the Warehouse, he also works as a teacher.

==== Bruce ====
Bruce (Mike Winfield) is highly flamboyant dock worker. He first appears in "Lotto" as an applicant for a position in the warehouse, which he was eventually hired for, and reappears in "Doomsday", where he unsettles Gabe with an extremely enthusiastic greeting.

==== Frank ====
Frank (Brad William Henke) is a truculent and unruly warehouse worker, who defaces Pam's mural by painting lewd pictures on it, in the episode "Vandalism". Pam initially tries to be civil and talk things out with him, along with Toby and Nellie, but Frank is very disrespectful towards them and does not apologize for what he did, as they have no authority over him. Pam and Dwight then take revenge by painting childish pictures on his beloved truck (albeit with washable paint). Frank, incensed by the payback, later confronts Pam in the parking lot, where he shows signs that he is going to physically assault her. Before he has the chance, however, Brian, the documentary crew's boom mic operator, breaks protocol and intervenes by hitting the warehouse employee across the face with his mic. The two end up in a scuffle, but Frank is restrained by two other documentarians. In the end, the audience learns that both Frank and Brian have been terminated from Dunder Mifflin and the documentary, respectively.

=== Other employees ===
==== Louanne Kelley ====
Louanne Kelley worked in the Annex along with Toby and Kelly. She had the desk near the kitchen door which faces toward Toby's desk. She had no lines and is seen only in passing in the first three seasons. In Season 1, her hair is red, but by Season 2, she is seen with gray hair. She does not participate in meetings or almost any other event. She was never seen again after the season 3 episode "Back from Vacation", but her desk and other belongings are apparently still in use.

==== Devon White ====
Devon White (Devon Abner) is an office worker in Supplier Relations. He is an office employee who sits across from Creed (who is directly responsible for getting Devon fired, to save his own job). Devon (dressed as a hobo) is reluctantly laid off by Michael on "Halloween", and takes it badly, smashing a pumpkin on Michael's car in retaliation. The episode marks his only dialogue in front of the camera. When Michael later receives a $3,000 Christmas bonus in "Christmas Party" because Dunder Mifflin saved money through downsizing, he considers calling Devon to thank him, saying "some good came of it".

Devon is also warned by Dwight in "The Dundies" to keep his speech short. A deleted scene from "Diversity Day" shows Devon with a "West Nile" sign on his forehead, as he escapes the seminar for a smoke. A deleted scene from "Valentine's Day" shows Michael walking down the street in New York City, when a seemingly homeless pedestrian seems to recognize him and then chases him down the street. In the following scene, Michael reveals that it was Devon chasing him, and cluelessly reflects that it was nice to see Devon again and get closure on their whole story. In the series finale, it is revealed that Devon has been rehired by Dwight because Dwight always thought he was a good worker, ironically to replace Creed.

==== Kendall ====
Kendall (John Hartmann) is the Human Resources representative for corporate. He was mentioned in the episode "The Job", during Jim's interview, by David Wallace, who called him an "irritating HR guy", and informed Jim that Kendall will probably be the only person that Jim will not like, mirroring Michael's dislike of Toby. In "Business Ethics", when Holly learns that Meredith is trading sexual favors for supply discounts, Kendall not only is not upset by the news, but believes that Meredith is doing the company a good turn, and angrily tells Holly that she has failed to just get the review forms signed, and tells her that if she cannot do that, then they will need another discussion. Given Kendall's authority over Holly, it is reasonable to assume that he is not merely the HR representative for the corporate office but a more senior HR representative, possibly the department head.

Kendall makes his first on-screen appearance in "Stress Relief", and appears again in "Company Picnic", in which he and Toby talk about past Human Resources stories, showing a similar personality to Toby. Since he was the corporate HR representative, it is presumed that he lost his job or was transferred out of New York to a new Sabre branch that needed its own HR person on hand.

==== Sadiq ====
Sadiq (Omi Vaidya) does tech support. First appearing in "E-mail Surveillance", he is sent by management to teach Michael how to monitor office email. Sadiq attends Jim's barbecue (to the consternation of Michael, who wasn't invited and still doesn't appear to trust Sadiq's motives). In "Fun Run", Sadiq cleans a computer virus from Pam's computer. He is a Sikh but resents being only classified by his religion, telling a meeting during "Fun Run" that he likes listening to hip hop and National Public Radio, and is restoring a 1967 Corvette. When the company is acquired by Sabre, Sadiq presumably loses his job, as a new IT Technician, Nick, takes his place. Dwight tells Sadiq's angrily departing successor Nick that they liked Sadiq for two reasons: he kept to himself, and they were afraid to cross him because they thought he might actually be a terrorist.

==== Nick ====
Nick (Nelson Franklin) was the IT administrator brought in by Sabre corporate (however, Franklin made a previous cameo in "Job Fair" as "Graphic Design Guy"). Reserved but amiable, he is regarded as a "nerd" by Michael, and the rest of the staff often treated him badly, often forgetting his name, and even his occupation within the office. He quits his job in the sixth-season finale, in order to join Teach for America in Detroit, but, after the employees once again misremember who he is, and Dwight insults him, he tells off the entire staff for their poor treatment of him. He vengefully reveals a number of personal secrets that various office members have kept hidden on their computers, and gives everyone the finger as he leaves. Nick is later mentioned, along with all the other former IT administrators, in "WUPHF.com", but is only referred to as "glasses", showing that, even after his ireful final encounter with them, the Scranton branch employees are still unable to recall his name.

The reason behind Nick's departure was due to Franklin leaving the show in order to star on the short-lived television series Traffic Light, which also starred Office veteran David Denman.

==== Tony Gardner ====
Tony Gardner (Mike Bruner) was a morbidly obese bespectacled employee at the Stamford branch, and is one of the six employees that were transferred to Scranton during "The Merger". Tony also has a tendency to whine, as shown in his first appearance in the "Diwali" episode, when his chips get stuck in a vending machine, and he asks Karen to use her "skinny little arms" to help him get them out. Before even meeting Tony, Dwight tries to persuade Michael to fire him on his first day in order to scare the new employees straight. On Tony's first day, he can hardly take Michael's antics, but he hits his breaking point when Michael and Dwight tried to lift him onto a table for an orientation demonstration (Michael refers to his leg as a "hock"). Humiliated and angry, Tony quits, admitting that he was not completely sure about transferring to begin with, but mostly blaming Michael's management style. Michael is so angry that he overrides Tony's resignation and officially fires him, which in turn angers Jan because the firing means Dunder-Mifflin now has to pay Tony a large severance. Later, in "Lecture Circuit" Michael regrets firing him and briefly considers finding him and getting closure, but reconsiders because he is "too fat", calling him "Pepperoni Tony" as Pam looks at him with undisguised disgust. Tony has a cameo appearance in Michael's film Threat Level Midnight (in the episode "Threat Level Midnight") as a pianist. In an Officetally.com Question and Answer discussion, show co-star and executive producer B. J. Novak implied that Michael did end up apologizing to Tony, by offering him a role in the movie.

==== Martin Nash ====
Martin Nash (Wayne Wilderson) was the Supplier Relations representative at the Stamford branch, and one of the six employees transferred to Scranton in "The Merger". According to a deleted scene from "The Merger", Martin is 37 years old. Before working at Dunder Mifflin, he served time in prison for insider trading. However, since he was put in a minimum-security facility, Martin claims his time in prison was just really boring. When he was released, he was hired by Josh through a federal reformed convict employment program, which allows Dunder Mifflin to receive rebate checks. Michael made a bad first impression on Martin, when he told the African-American employee, "I will show you where all the slaves work". He attempted to befriend Stanley, but failed. In "The Convict", when Martin's past is revealed to the office, Michael overly stresses his trust in Martin to everyone, worried that people would see him as a racist for looking at him as an ex-convict. However, since Martin's tales from prison were generally positive, everyone actually envies his experience compared to their jobs, frustrating Michael. Martin is the second employee from the Stamford branch to leave because of Michael's management style, particularly after Michael makes his prison sentence the focal point of one of his seminars.

==== Hannah Smoterich-Barr ====
Hannah Smoterich-Barr (Ursula Burton) was an Accountant at the Stamford branch, and was one of the six employees transferred to Scranton. In "The Merger", Hannah had unpleasant encounters with Ryan (who found it impossible to concentrate while she was using a breast pump) and Creed (who photographed her left breast and made it his computer's desktop wallpaper). In "The Convict", she dresses her infant son in pink, claiming it is his "favorite color", and is offended when anyone assumes the child is female. In "A Benihana Christmas", Hannah is one of the only employees to attend Angela's Christmas party. Hannah quits her job while Michael is on vacation at Sandals in Jamaica, after complaining that she was not being accommodated as a working mother in accordance with Dunder Mifflin policy, making her the third transferred employee from the Stamford branch to quit at Scranton.

== Scranton Regional Manager applicants ==
In the season 7 finale "Search Committee: Part 2", Jim, Toby and Gabe interview several applicants for the position that had been held by Deangelo Vickers. The applicants include Andy Bernard; Dwight Schrute; Kelly Kapoor; Darryl Philbin; Nellie Bertram, who was not hired but was later placed in a different position at Sabre; Robert California, who was offered the position and accepted it, only to immediately quit to become CEO of Sabre; and the following others.

- Fred Henry (Will Arnett) is a meteorologist and Navy veteran. He claims that he has a three-step plan to double profits at the branch. In an interview with the documentary crew, he is confident that he will be hired (even though he does not even remember the name of the company, erroneously believing it is Vance Refrigeration after glancing at the building tenants list). Paul Lieberstein said that Arnett would have been a top choice to take the role, but he had filmed a pilot for the television series Up All Night that was likely to get picked up by NBC after his appearance was filmed.
- Merv Bronte (Ray Romano) is first seen in the lobby, where Robert California tells him the office staff are like prisoners in a dying industry, leaving Merv to question if he wants the job. He sabotages his interview by eating lunch there and bad-mouthing his current employer. After his job interview, he expresses regret over believing Robert, saying that the people in the office are the nicest people that he has ever met, and he feels like he is afraid of being happy. In addition to his established job, he was supposed to start another job on the day he was interviewed.
- Finger Lakes Guy (Jim Carrey) is a nasally voiced man, who, according to Jim, was one of the top candidates for the job, along with Darryl and Andy. His real name is never revealed; he is nicknamed "Finger Lakes guy" because he repeatedly mentioned, during his (unseen) interview, that if hired, he will need to have his first two weeks off in order to travel to the Finger Lakes. He reveals to the documentary film crew that he snuck away from his family while vacationing in the Finger Lakes in order to interview for the job, and needs to return soon, as his family will begin to worry about him.
- David Brent (Ricky Gervais) is a former office manager for Wernham Hogg Paper in Slough, England (as seen in the original UK version of the series). He appears at the beginning of the seventh-season episode "The Seminar", in which he meets Michael Scott outside an elevator, trades racist jokes with him, and asks whether there are any openings at Dunder Mifflin. In "Search Committee", he applies for the Regional Manager position via videoconferencing from the UK.
- Miserly Man (Warren Buffett) is an elderly applicant, who, during his interview, haggles over his mileage compensation, then cryptically asks if Dunder Mifflin monitors long-distance phone calls.

== Family, friends, and loved ones ==
=== Michael's loved ones/family ===
- Carol Stills (portrayed by Nancy Carell, Steve Carell's wife) is Michael's real estate agent. She has two children. Michael entertained her kids at an ice-skating rink and she was Michael's date to the casino night. In a deleted scene, it is revealed that after "Casino Night", Michael continued seeing her over the three months in between the second and third seasons. Carol rejected Michael's marriage proposal after they had been on nine dates. In "A Benihana Christmas", after Michael gives her a Christmas card containing a family photo with Michael's face superimposed over Carol's ex-husband, she rejects his Christmas gift of two tickets to Jamaica and breaks up with him. In the episode "Sex Ed", when Michael asks Carol if he romanticizes his relationships, she says that is definitely the case. In "Finale", she has been showing Jim and Pam's house for the past two months, Pam having put the house up for sale.
- Donna Newton (Amy Pietz) is the manager of the bar "Sid & Dexter". She first appears in "Happy Hour", where she reprimands Michael for his disruptive behavior in her establishment. She asks him to leave, but he refuses, and she eventually gives up on the matter. Michael goes over to talk to her, and they argue at first, but then they engage in a conversation, and begin flirting with one another. She reappears in "Body Language", in which she visits the office in order to buy office equipment. Jim and Pam team up as her sales representatives, but their pitch is undermined by Michael's flirtatious interruptions. Michael takes over the sales presentation, but becomes unsure whether her flirtatiousness demonstrates a genuine interest in him or merely a ploy to extract a lower price. After Donna departs the office, she leaves behind a barrette, which Michael returns to her in the parking lot. Michael apologizes for his behavior, only to find that Donna is indeed interested in him, and the two kiss. In "The Cover-Up", Michael discovers their relationship is an extramarital affair. In the next episode, the office staff tells him that he should break up with her, because she is cheating on her husband. Michael rejects their pleas, but ultimately ends his relationship with Donna via a text message. In "Sex Ed", after Michael discovers that he may have herpes, he calls her, and while she is pleased to hear from him, she is mortified when he reveals his STD, as she fears that he may have transmitted it to her.
- Lucas "Luke" Cooper (Evan Peters) is the son of Michael's half-sister, from whom he had been estranged from 1995 to 2010, as a result of losing Luke in a forest as a child. In order to make amends for the incident, Michael hired him as the new office assistant sometime between the episodes "Whistleblower" and "Nepotism", although he proved inept at his new occupation. Luke is disrespectful during a meeting, so Michael loses his temper and spanks Luke, who is humiliated and tearfully leaves the office.

=== Jim's family/loved ones ===
- Gerald (Robert Pine) and Betsy Halpert (Perry Smith) are Jim's parents. In "Frame Toby", Jim purchases their house, where he grew up, for him and Pam to live in. They first appear on-screen in "Niagara", where they attend their son's wedding to Pam. During the ceremony, Gerald can be seen wearing a kilt.
- Thomas (Blake Robbins) and Peter Halpert (Tug Coker) are Jim's obnoxious older brothers who, like him, possess a great love for practical jokes. They first appear in "Employee Transfer", in which they have lunch with their brother and his fiancée. However, unbeknownst to Jim, Pam met with them before lunch to clue them in on a prank she would be playing on him, but Tom and Pete instead decided to make fun of her interest in art, as opposed to Pam's idea of losing her engagement ring. During lunch, they make numerous insults towards her art career, causing Jim to come to her defense. After the argument escalates, Tom and Pete reveal it to be a prank, with Pam awkwardly confirming this. Afterward, Jim receives a text message from them welcoming Pam into the family, and Pam suggests they should "prank" Tom about being bald over Thanksgiving. They later reappear in "Niagara", attending Jim and Pam's wedding, for which they (along with Michael and Dwight) organize to have everyone dance down the aisle in the style of the viral video, JK Wedding Entrance Dance.
- Katy Moore (Amy Adams) is a handbag saleswoman, who stops by the office in the season 1 finale, "Hot Girl". Upon seeing her, both Michael and Dwight are instantly attracted to her, with Michael commenting that she is like the "Pam 6.0", and Dwight considering her to be the ideal woman. Michael and Dwight each make a move on her; Michael flirts with her aggressively, and Dwight shows interest in purchasing a handbag. However, she ignores their advances, and begins dating Jim, a relationship that only lasted for a few months. After Pam and Roy decide to set a date for their wedding, a devastated Jim breaks up with Katy in "Booze Cruise", when he ungraciously admits that the two will never be as deeply in love with each other as Roy and Pam seem to be when seeing them together. Along with Toby, Katy is a graduate of Bishop O'Hara High School, where she was a cheerleader. She bonds with Roy on the Booze Cruise, when they realize that they went to rival high schools, and she cheered at games against the football team Roy played on. According to an OfficeTally.com Question and Answer discussion with B. J. Novak, he originally wrote for her to appear in Michael's film, Threat Level Midnight, as a "floozy" that Michael's character, Michael Scarn, would have unsatisfying sex with and reflect on how much he missed his late, sexually voracious wife, Catherine Zeta-Jones Scarn. Katy would have then appeared in a subsequent talking-head interview, where she would have expressed embarrassment over the role, but also talk about how she had been interested in pursuing an acting career at the time. The character's reappearance was prevented by Adams' lack of availability.

=== Pam's family/friends ===
- Helene Beesly (Shannon Cochran in Season 2, Linda Purl in Seasons 6, 7 and 9) is Pam's mother. Pam gets excited when Helene comes to visit her at work in "Sexual Harassment". Helene appears to get along with Roy very well, but is eager to meet Jim after Pam talked about him in private. In "Stress Relief", it is revealed Helene and Pam's father William are going through a rough patch in their marriage and it eventually ends in divorce after Jim confesses to William his deep and abiding love for Pam, a feeling that William never felt with Helene. In "Niagara", Helene comes to the wedding and is disturbed when William comes with a new girlfriend who is half his age. Helene takes pity on Michael when he talks about his past relationships and invites him into her room after the wedding. In "The Lover", Michael confirms to Jim and Pam that he is dating Helene, much to Pam's horror and anger. Pam maintains a hostile attitude toward their relationship until they go out to lunch for Helene's birthday in "Double Date", where she sees that Helene is happy with Michael. However, when Michael learns that Helene is turning 58 and has already done many things Michael hasn't done yet, he breaks up with her in front of Jim and Pam. In "The Delivery", Helene comes to visit Pam at the hospital after she gives birth and has an awkward moment with Michael.

Michael later visits her at a playground in "Sex Ed", where he attempts to discuss their past relationship and see if what they had was genuine. She bitterly points out his skewed sense of memory, to which Michael responds by insulting her and then walking off. Helene appears in three more episodes after that: in "Christening, where she is seen in the background attending CeCe's christening; in "The Search", with a voice-only part where she calls Jim on his cell phone to tell him that she unintentionally locked CeCe in her car (with the keys inside it); and in "Threat Level Midnight", where she is briefly seen in Michael's titular homemade film as a slutty nurse (to Pam's obvious discomfort). Helene now spends her days watching Jim and Pam's children while the two are at work. In "Lice" she inadvertently revealed that Pam, not Meredith (as everyone assumed), was responsible for spreading lice to the office after calling Pam at work to inform her that Cece's school had discovered she had lice.

Shannon Cochran portrayed Helene in "Sexual Harassment", but she was unavailable to return in Season 6 because she was committed to a 12-month stage production tour of August: Osage County, so she was replaced by Linda Purl.

- William Beesly (Rick Overton) is Pam's father. He first appears in "Stress Relief", where he stays at Pam and Jim's house after an argument with Helene. After a conversation with Jim, William decides to separate from Helene; he later reveals he was motivated by realizing he had never loved her as much as Jim loves Pam. He reappears in "Niagara", attending Jim and Pam's wedding, where he is accompanied by his considerably younger new girlfriend, whom Jim mistakes for his niece.
- Penny Beesly (Anna Camp) is Pam's sister. She appears in "Niagara", where she is the maid of honor at Pam and Jim's wedding. When Pam introduces her to Oscar and Kevin, she manages to unintentionally offend the former when she mistakes the latter for his ex, Gil. When the ceremony is interrupted by the JK Wedding Entrance Dance recreation, she is apologetic to Pam for allowing it to happen, but Pam encourages her sister to dance down the aisle along with everyone else.

Camp would later go on to star with Mindy Kaling in her show The Mindy Project.

- Sylvia (Peggy Stewart), known as "Meemaw" to her family, is Pam's conservative grandmother, whom Pam describes as the only elderly woman at her wedding "with no smile wrinkles". She first appears in "Niagara", where she travels to Niagara Falls for Jim and Pam's wedding. But, after Jim inadvertently reveals that Pam is pregnant, she refuses to attend, until Michael is able to convince her to do so by falsely telling her that Jim and Pam will name their baby after her (or "Sylvio", if it is a boy). She reappears in "Christening", where she attends CeCe's christening.
- Alex (Rich Sommer) is a student at the Pratt Institute in New York City who quickly befriends Pam during her summer internship. The two share a couple of jokes about two of the professors in "Weight Loss". He makes another appearance in "Customer Survey", where he tries to convince Pam to not return to Scranton, but instead stay in New York to pursue her career in art. It is indicated that he is attracted to Pam, and that he views Jim the same way Jim viewed Roy. In an interview with USA Today, Sommer revealed that his character was originally intended to be a potential roadblock for Jim and Pam's relationship, but fan reaction to this storyline was so overwhelmingly negative, that the writers abandoned the idea.
- Isabel Poreba (Kelen Coleman) is a dental hygienist who attends Jim and Pam's wedding as a bridesmaid, where she has sex with Dwight. The night before the wedding, she takes a liking to Dwight when he talks about his farm and the two end up having a one-night stand. She develops a crush on Dwight, which shocks Pam. However, Dwight blows her off on the day of the wedding when she tries to talk to him. In "The Delivery", Isabel visits Pam and Jim in the hospital after Pam gives birth, where they find that Pam had breastfed the wrong baby. Isabel leaves to drop some food at Jim and Pam's house where Dwight is fixing their kitchen. Dwight is surprised and asks if he could come in for a cleaning. In "Happy Hour", she and Dwight start to get to know each other better as the two share similar interests (Isabel's older brothers are police officers or are serving in the USMC). Dwight decides Isabel would be better suited to have his children than Angela, with whom he had entered into a contract to have a child. When Dwight calls off the contract, Angela confronts Dwight and Isabel in the parking lot. Isabel smacks Angela on the head and scares her off. Dwight calls her an "impressive specimen" and passionately kisses her. It is presumed their relationship did not last as she has not been seen or mentioned since then.

=== Jim and Pam's children ===
- Cecelia Marie "CeCe" Halpert (portrayed by Mia Cavolic and twins Baily and Sienna Strull) is Jim and Pam's daughter, in real life named after Jenna Fischer's niece. Pam's pregnancy is discovered in the fifth-season finale "Company Picnic", and she gives birth to CeCe in the sixth-season episode, "The Delivery", on March 4, 2010, after 19 hours of labor. Jim jokingly states that CeCe was conceived in a porta-potty at Burning Man. CeCe makes appearances in several episodes throughout the sixth, seventh, eighth, and ninth seasons.
- Philip Halpert is Pam and Jim's infant son, named after Pam's grandfather (to Angela's rage, as she wanted Pam to give up the name so she could have it for herself in tribute to her favorite cat). In the eighth-season premiere, Pam is approximately eight months pregnant, and she and Jim reveal to the camera crew that they are expecting a boy. Unlike with his older sister, there was no episode focusing on Philip's birth; it was instead announced on a blog.

=== Dwight's family/friends/loved ones ===
- Mose Schrute (portrayed by writer Michael Schur) is Dwight's cousin, who lives with Dwight at the Schrute family beet farm. In "The Injury", Michael refers to Mose as Dwight's "weirdo cousin" who is "27 years old [and has] never left the beet farm." Mose wears an Amish-esque beard and clothing, and speaks and behaves in a very naive and childlike manner, at times even appearing mentally unstable and very socially awkward. The source of his mental imbalance was somewhat explained in the episode "St. Patrick's Day", when Dwight explains to the camera crew, "I didn't see my father for the first two years of my life. I thought my mother was my father, and my wet nurse was my mother... Turned out fine for me. But Mose, same story... different ending". In "Money", Dwight informs Jim that Mose has had nightmares ever since "the storm". In the same episode, Mose is also shown, in the background, throwing manure at Dwight in the beet fields. Like Dwight, Mose is a skilled table tennis player, as seen at the end of "The Deposition". In "Did I Stutter?", Dwight's organizational chart shows Mose (who is not even employed at the office) is in charge of Heindl, Shirley, Vater, and Mutter. "Vater" and "Mutter" are German for "father" and "mother", and Heindl and Shirley are Dwight's uncle and aunt. In "Jury Duty", Dwight says that Mose has never been taught what sex is. In "Tallahassee", Dwight records a message for his presumed son, Phillip Lipton, and states that, if he dies, Phillip is the rightful inheritor of Schrute Farms, but warns him to kill Mose, before Mose can kill him.

Mose first appears in "Initiation", in which he takes part in Dwight's misguided attempts to haze Ryan at Schrute Farms. After Ryan storms off, Dwight attempts to present him with a whittling that Mose made, which is in the shape of the Venus of Willendorf. He later appears in "Money", and in the fourth season finale, "Goodbye, Toby", in which he assists Dwight with placing a raccoon in Holly Flax's car. He also appears in "The Surplus", and in the cold open of "Koi Pond". In "Counseling", he is seen painting the Daycare Center Dwight is planning to open in the building. He also appears in the eighth season episode "Garden Party", where, in the role as valet, he forcibly takes Toby's keys and parks the car in a field; he is later shown attempting to jump over a row of cars on a motorbike, in the style of Evel Knievel. In the season 8 finale, "Free Family Portrait Studio", he is used as a distraction to get Angela off of Dwight's tail on his way to the hospital to get the DNA testing of her son's feces, in an attempt to prove that he is indeed the father. In the episode "Junior Salesman", Mose is a candidate for the eponymous position, but flees from the building during his interview when Dwight points out a lie on his resumé that Mose used to work at the Dow Chemical Company. In a prior talking-head interview, Dwight talked about how he believed Mose would be a good fit for the job, as he has papyrophobia (fear of paper), which would motivate him to sell as much paper as he could in order to get rid of it. A comment from Dwight's aunt, Shirley, in "Moving On", implies that, at one point, he had a sexual relationship with a "lady scarecrow".

- Fannie Schrute (Majandra Delfino) is Dwight's younger sister, who appeared in the ninth-season episode "The Farm". Described as an attractive and urban, if somewhat pseudo-intellectual, liberal woman with an ironic sense of humor but a great heart, Fannie left Schrute Farms in favor of a city life in Boston. She is now divorced, and appears to have full custody of her young son, Cameron, as he stated to Dwight that he has never met his father. While she is the only one of her siblings who is fully opposed to running her aunt Shirley's estate (as Jeb flip-flops between wanting to and not), after she sees that Dwight and Cameron have bonded, she agrees to return to home to run the property with her siblings, though both she and Jeb let Dwight take on the responsibility of managing it.
- Jeb Schrute (Thomas Middleditch) is Dwight's ne'er-do-well younger brother. After leaving the army, he traveled to northern California, where he purchased a 9-acre pot farm (albeit unknowingly). After the death of his aunt Shirley, he moves back home to Pennsylvania with his siblings in order to care for her estate. Jeb is first mentioned by his brother in "Dwight Christmas", and appears alongside him via a family photograph from 1982. He made his first live appearance in "The Farm".
- Cameron Whitman (Blake Garrett Rosenthal) is Fannie's son and Dwight's nerdy and slightly weird 9-year-old nephew. While at first, Dwight is more or less disgusted with him and his city slicker ways, the two later bond when he teaches him how to milk a goat. He appeared in the episode "The Farm".
- Zeke Schrute (Matt Jones) is Dwight's cousin and Mose's brother, and the self-appointed comedian of the family (since Dwight was the "cool kid" growing up and Mose was "the visionary"). He first appears in the episode "Junior Salesman", interviewing to be Jim's part-time replacement, and reappears in "The Farm".
- Shirley (Mary Gillis) was Dwight's aunt, whom he considered to be the closest thing he had to a mom (as his own was very cold and distant, and, ironically, he considered her to be the closest thing he had to an aunt). She makes her first appearance in "Moving On", in which Dwight acquires the help of Angela in order to bathe her. Initially, he wants to merely take his aunt out and spray her with a hose, but Angela talks him into letting her do it in a more dignified manner, and through the process, the two begin to remember their feelings for each other, something that they do not realize they are experiencing mutually until Shirley playfully comments on the chemistry between them. In the subsequent episode, Dwight announces that she has passed on, and, later on, at the funeral, Dwight and his siblings receive a shock when they learn that she willed her estate to them. Their inheritance was to serve as the catalyst for Dwight leaving Dunder Mifflin, in order for Wilson to star in his own spin-off about the character running the farm. Upon review of the episode, however, NBC decided not to pick it up.
- Heinrich Manheim (Tom Bower) is the Schrute siblings' manipulative, avaricious, malevolent, unhinged and very likely Nazi war criminal great uncle, who was to be a major character in Dwight's spin-off "The Farm". His part was cut from the NBC broadcast of the episode, but he appears in a deleted scene, threatening to kill Dwight unless he relinquishes his inheritance to him, which Dwight fails to take seriously.
- Henry Bruegger (Allan Havey) is a somewhat stoic neighboring Brussels sprout farmer, who appears in "The Farm", briefly pulling up in his truck to pay his respects at Shirley's funeral. He reappears in the subsequent episode, in which he tries to rope Dwight into co-leasing a tractor with him.
- Esther Bruegger (Nora Kirkpatrick) is one of Henry's five daughters, who appears in "The Farm". She and Dwight are shown flirting at Shirley's funeral, and later in the episode, when everyone is outside on the porch, playing The Decemberists' Sons and Daughters, Dwight drops a pair of crows' beaks at the feet of Esther – signaling his desire to court her. Following tradition, Esther reciprocates by crushing the beaks with her boot. She reappears in "Promos", visiting Dwight at the office with her sisters and father, the latter of whom tries to get Dwight to co-lease a tractor with him. However, she later explains to Dwight that her father really is trying to take advantage of him, and suggests a better deal he should make, affirming that her feelings for him are genuine and that she was not using him, as Clark had believed and warned the fellow Salesman.
- Rolf Ahl (James Urbaniak) is introduced in the season 5 finale "Company Picnic" as Dwight's new best friend. Dwight claims to have met him in a shoe store after having heard him "asking for a shoe that could increase his speed and not leave any tracks". Rolf and Dwight appear to share very similar personalities and interests. However, Rolf is much more outspoken than Dwight and at one point during the volleyball game has to be quieted by Dwight after telling David Wallace and Charles Miner from corporate that "You suckers are goin down! They're gonna wipe their asses with your serves! Piss all over your faces!". Dwight is also not happy when Rolf insults Angela for the second time during the volleyball game, by calling her a whore, and he is told by Dwight to "knock it off", a demand to which he (grudgingly) assents. Rolf is also seen again in the episode "The Delivery", where he helps Dwight remodel Jim and Pam's kitchen. Three seasons later, in "Junior Salesman", he interviews for the titular position. Dwight initially believes he would be perfect for the job; however, it soon becomes evident to him that he is not cut out for the paper business. After all of Dwight's applicants leave the office, angry that not one of them were chosen, Rolf warns Dwight not to open any suspicious packages he will be receiving, before backpedaling and telling him to go right ahead, unconvincingly claiming that they are "totally safe". Rolf later appears in the finale at Dwight's bachelor party alongside Mose and Gabor, showing his feud with Dwight was ultimately short-lived.
- Trevor Bortmen (Chris Gethard) is a friend of Dwight's. He works as a self-licensed and self-employed Private Investigator, and, like Dwight, is a former volunteer sheriff, having been fired from the force for reasons unknown. He makes his debut in "The Target", in which Angela hires him to kill Oscar after she finds out about his affair with her husband. While Trevor concedes that her request is "a little crazy", he agrees to the job. However, after Dwight objects to the murder, he convinces Angela to opt for a kneecapping instead. Trevor later arrives at the office, posing as a sandwich delivery man (with the lead pipe he placed in the sandwich being clearly visible), and pursues both Dwight and Oscar after the former rushes the latter out from the building. He manages to ambush the pair outside, but is hesitant once it is time to actually attack Oscar, giving the Accountant the opportunity to take away his weapon, causing Trevor to flee. He later reappears in "Junior Salesman", as one of Dwight's original applicants for the position of being Jim's part-time replacement; however, during his interview, he immediately effaces any confidence Dwight had in him that he would be suitable for the job.
- Melvina Whitaker (Beth Grant) is Dwight's former babysitter. She debuts in "Dinner Party", in which she acts like his date in order for the Salesman to attend the couples-only dinner held by Michael and Jan (though he maintains that their relationship is purely carnal). After the tension between the two hosts erupts, she decides she wants to leave, but Dwight refuses to give her a ride home; he later passes her by at a bus stop in a seedy-looking neighborhood while driving Michael to his farm. She reappears years later in the ninth season, applying to be a Junior Salesman at the office, but is ultimately passed on.
- Ira Glicksberg (Lance Krall) is Dwight's karate sensei, who referees a sparring match between Dwight and Michael, in season 2's "The Fight". He makes a reappearance in the ninth season, interviewing for the position of a junior Salesman, in the episode of the same name. According to his resume released by NBC.com, he was at one point in his life so obese that he worked as a sumo wrestler.
- Gabor Csupczyk (Eric Wareheim) is an old friend of Dwight's who was a classmate of his at Chuck Xavier's School for Gifted Youngsters. According to Dwight, the whole program was actually a con to shanghai the students into doing menial labor, something which Gabor remains oblivious to, believing normal abilities he possesses to be superpowers (e.g. hearing at night and making dogs understand where he points). In his resume, it mentions that he attended Scranton Community College until he was expelled after an accusation that he was using his "psychic powers" to cheat, and that he is the founder (as well as sole member) of The Mutant Fellowship for The Good of All Man Kind.
- Wolf von Weyler (Will McCormack) is a mentally disturbed friend of Dwight's, who appears as one of his sponsored applicants in "Junior Salesman". He has some homicidal tendencies; Dwight mentioned that Wolf has executed him during their paintball games at point blank range multiple times, even when they were on the same team.

=== Angela's family ===
- Robert Lipton (Jack Coleman), often referred to as "The Senator" by Angela, is a Republican Pennsylvania state senator who resides in Scranton. He first appears in "WUPHF.com", where he meets Angela at Dwight's hay festival. The two begin dating shortly after that, and Lipton eventually proposes to her in the seventh-season finale. At the start of the eighth season, they are now married, and she is pregnant with his child, whom she gives birth to in "Jury Duty".

Lipton is a widower, mentioning in his debut episode that his wife has been deceased for a few years. He is also shown to have a young son. However, despite his previous marriage, it was strongly implied in various episodes that Lipton was actually a closeted homosexual, with Oscar several times pointing this out to the cameras. The episode "Fundraiser" hinted that he had become attracted to Oscar, which is later confirmed in "Free Family Portrait Studio", when he asks him why he did not call him after the event, and heavily alludes to his supposed homosexuality.

The two later begin an affair throughout the ninth season, which Angela discovers in "The Whale", briefly causing a rift between Angela and Oscar. The episode "Vandalism" establishes that she has remained with him, although only as a trophy wife. When the TV series documentary about the Scranton branch is being publicized, Angela and Oscar realize that the senator will be outed as his and Oscar's affair was also documented. Angela later speaks with the senator, who agrees to hold a press conference, and leaves Angela with the impression that they'll suppress any news of his affair with Oscar. However, the senator comes out of the closet live on the press conference to Angela's shock. The senator publicly thanks Oscar for coming to terms with his sexuality, only to blindside Oscar when it's discovered that the senator is in love with his Chief of Staff. As a result, Angela divorces the senator and ends up in a bad living situation thereafter.

- Phillip Halsted Schrute is Angela's infant son, whom she named after her favorite cat. She gives birth to him in the episode "Jury Duty". However, despite Angela's claim that he was born prematurely, Phillip weighs 9 lb 7 oz (4.3 kg). Angela eventually admits to Oscar that she is lying about the date of conception, as Phillip was conceived out of wedlock. After Dwight is informed of this information, he privately confronts Angela that it is highly probable that he is Phillip's biological father, as he and Angela had sex around the time Phillip was conceived. In "Tallahassee", Dwight reveals that, after he dies, Phillip will inherit Schrute Farms. In the season 8 finale, Dwight steals one of Phillip's soiled diapers and takes it to a hospital in order to run the DNA test, to find out if he is the child's father. In the ninth-season premiere, "New Guys", it is revealed that he is not. (A fact which confounded fans due to the fact that NBC deleted a scene where Dwight ponders if he accidentally stole Phillip Halpert's diaper instead.) When the senator comes out of the closet, he and Angela divorce, prompting Angela and Phillip to move into a studio apartment. In A.A.R.M., when Dwight babysits Phillip, he begins to have suspicions once again, but Angela denies it. However, when Dwight proposes to Angela at the end of episode, it is revealed that Dwight is in fact Phillip's father, as confirmed by Angela.
- Bandit, formerly named "Garbage" by Mose (due to the animal's habit of eating garbage), is one of Angela's cats. He first appears in "Dunder Mifflin Infinity", where, after Dwight captures the feral animal from his barn, he presents him to Angela, in an attempt to make up for mercy-killing her cat, Sprinkles. However, Angela declines the gift, and Dwight gets rid of Bandit by releasing him into Bob Vance's office. Andy later captures the cat in the Warehouse, in the episode "Money", and gives him to Angela, which, this time, she accepts. Bandit later reappears in "Stress Relief", when Dwight sets the office on fire, and Angela grabs the cat (who was sleeping in a desk drawer) and yells to Oscar, who is climbing in the ceiling, to save her pet. Unfortunately, when she throws him up to Oscar, Oscar fails to catch him, and Bandit falls through the ceiling. While it was unknown if Bandit had survived the fall, he is later confirmed to be alive, when he makes a cameo in "Two Weeks", chewing on a copier cord. He makes another cameo in "The Delivery", when Jim, proving to the camera crew that he can put a diaper on anything, does so to Bandit, angering Angela. In the ninth-season episode Paper Airplanes, it is implied that Bandit died sometime between them, as she has a cat named Bandit 2.
- Rachael Martin (Rachael Harris) is Angela's sister. In "A Benihana Christmas", Angela reveals to the camera crew that she and her sister have not spoken in sixteen years over "some disagreement, I don't even remember." By final season the two have made amends off-screen, and she attends Angela's bachelorette party and serves as her maid-of-honor at her wedding.

=== Andy's family/loved ones/friends ===
- Walter Bernard, Sr. (Stephen Collins) and Ellen Bernard (Dee Wallace) are Andy's affluent, ritzy, fastidious parents, who view Andy as a disappointment, and as such, treat him with disdain. The two debuted in "Goodbye, Toby", where they attended Toby's farewell party, and also witnessed Andy's proposal to Angela (although, in this episode, they are portrayed by different, uncredited actors, and Walter is named "Andrew", just like his eldest son). Several years later, they reappear in the episode "Garden Party", where they attend Andy's garden party at Schrute Farms, along with Walter, Jr. After Andy becomes frustrated with his father and brother, Walter confronts Andy about his "obnoxious attitude", which he turns into a browbeating, as he tells Andy to stop seeking his approval, because he is not impressed that he is the "manager of some rinky dink branch". During "Angry Andy", Andy calls his father and tells him of Nellie Bertram stealing his job. It is implied that Walter refers to the job as a demotion to Andy, who is visibly defensive. However, shortly after this, Andy has an anger outburst, and picks the phone and finally stands up to his father, yelling "Dad, go to hell, I'm taller than you!" before hanging up on him. In the ninth season, Walter, Sr. bankrupts his family when he takes all of their money and flees to Argentina with his mistress; Andy then springs into action and sells off all of Walter's left-behind assets so that Ellen will have money to live on, and does so with such effectiveness that both Pam and Darryl express surprise at how competent he was at handling this crisis (though he balks for a long time at selling the family's most lucrative remaining asset, a boat, for personal reasons before he finally agrees the sale has to happen).
- Walter Bernard, Jr. (Josh Groban) is Andy's successful, talented younger brother, who is the favored child of Walter, Sr. and Ellen. He is first mentioned in "The Delivery", and later appears in "Garden Party", where he attends Andy's garden party at Schrute Farms, although his presence quickly makes Andy feel insecure and upstaged. However, he does seem to treat Andy with more respect than their parents do. In "After Hours", Andy mentions that his brother has gotten a boat. He returns in the episode "The Boat", where he has since become an alcoholic after his father took all of the family's money and left them in shambles. Andy discovers him passed out in the liquor closet of the family's boat (as Junior wanted to get the first relapse out of the way before checking into rehab), and then invites him on his trip to the Caribbean, as a way to sober him up and also spend some quality time with him.
- Jessica (Eleanor Seigler) is an assistant cross country coach at Bryn Mawr College, and Andy's ex-girlfriend. She is first mentioned in "Spooked", with Andy confiding in Erin that, while she has never come by the office, as per his request, as he believes it would make Erin uncomfortable, he is now worried that she is not calling him. Andy admits that things are "serious" between them, the two having gone on 31 dates. In "Christmas Wishes", Andy invites her to the office Christmas party. An emotionally confused Erin tries to be nice to Jessica, but ends up drinking too much at the party. In a drunken stupor, she tells Andy that her Christmas wish is for Jessica to die. Offended, he tells her to get over their breakup before storming off. In "Pool Party", Andy states in a talking-head interview, that his parents met Jessica, and were extremely impressed with her. So much so, that they gave Andy a Bernard family ring for him to use to propose to her with (although, Ellen took out the main diamond, as she felt it would be better suited for Walter, Jr.). Later, Andy brings Jessica to CEO Robert California's pool party at his mansion. In a deleted scene from that episode, she tells the camera crew that she and her brother were the "chicken fight champions" of their swimming club, and reveals that she grew up in West Hartford, Connecticut. She has a cameo in the episode "Special Project", where she and Andy are seen happily carpooling together, and in "Tallahassee", she calls him after quitting time at the office. However, in "Last Day in Florida", upon learning that Erin is not returning to Scranton, Andy realizes that he is, indeed, still in love with Erin, and not with Jessica. In "Get the Girl", Andy drives down to Florida to win Erin back, and the two rekindle their former relationship. The aftermath of this is addressed in the subsequent episode, "Welcome Party", in which Erin and Andy travel to Jessica's family's log cabin in order for him to break up with Jessica, but they are surprised to encounter Jessica and her friends having a bachelorette party. To make the break up less awkward, Andy initially tells Jessica that he is gay, but he later returns with Erin and tells the party that he and Erin are together, despite his earlier claim to Jessica that Erin was not "relationship material".
- Here Comes Treble is a Cornell college a cappella group, of which Andy was a member of and makes frequent references to. The group members, besides Andy (who was nicknamed "Boner Champ"), were "Carl 1" and "Carl 2" (who have not spoken to one another since their civil union ended), "Jingle Jangle", "Sandwich", "Doobie" (who now works as a bus driver), "Pubey Lewis & the News", "Sparerib", "Hopscotch", "Lunchbox", and "Broccoli Rob" Blatt. In the show's final Halloween episode, Andy becomes angry with Rob (portrayed by Stephen Colbert, via Skype) when he learns from the latest roster of Here Comes Treble (who he invited to perform for the office during the Halloween party) that he told the new group his nickname was "Boner Champ" and that his signature song was George Michael's "Faith", both of which were actually Andy's.

=== Erin's family/friends ===
- Reed (Sean Davis) is Erin's foster brother. The two lived together in an orphanage, from ages 10–12 and 15–18, and now share a house. He appears in "St. Patrick's Day", in which he interrupts Erin and Andy's date, and his behavior around his foster sister makes Andy feel uncomfortable.
- Irene (Georgia Engel) is a kind, elderly woman, who resides in Tallahassee. She first appears in "Test the Store", in which she befriends Erin, after Erin was ordered to remove a group of senior citizens from the Sabre store, and in "Last Day in Florida", it is revealed that Irene has hired her as a live-in maid, although Erin quickly proves herself to be fairly incompetent at this new occupation, a fact which Irene soon becomes painfully aware of. In her final appearance, Andy travels from Scranton to her home, in an attempt to win back Erin, and stays for a while. While Irene initially treats Andy with disdain, after Erin informs him that she does not love him and will not be coming with him, Irene privately tells Erin that she is making a mistake, and that she should go with him. Erin is surprised at this, since Irene acted so coldly to him, but she tells Erin that she was merely trying to protect her, and that she now realizes that Andy is a decent guy.

A subtle recurring gag is that, despite her age, Irene has been shown to be fairly intelligent when it comes to electronics, a trait that her grandson, Glenn, also seems to possess.

- Glenn (Brad Morris) is Irene's lethargic, middle-aged, unkempt and complaining grandson, who, as of "Get the Girl", is living with Irene, because he has run out of money. Glenn first appears in a deleted scene from "Last Day in Florida" (in which he is considerably more polite and immaculate), where Irene introduces Erin to him, and he asks her out on a date, which Erin accepts. However, it did not develop into a relationship, although the two appear to remain on good terms. When Erin decides to go back to Scranton, she worries about Irene and Glenn's well-being, but Irene assures her that they will be fine, and informs Erin that Glenn is going to sue Home Depot, because he somehow managed to get his foreskin caught on some of their lawn furniture.

=== Darryl's family ===
- Jada Philbin (Taylar Hollomon) is Darryl's daughter, to whom he makes several references throughout the earlier seasons of the show, with Darryl referring to her as the most important person in his life. Jada is officially introduced in "Classy Christmas" with Darryl trying to make the office Christmas party fun for her, which initially becomes disastrous. Jada wants to meet Santa Claus to tell him what she wants for Christmas. With Darryl's help, the two buy up all the snack chip bags in the vending machine and pass them out as gifts to the rest of the staff. Although Michael accidentally ruins Santa Claus by providing his own take on it, he later makes amends and dresses as the traditional Santa and has Jada tell him her list. She later appears in "Search Committee" when Darryl tries to make an impression on Jim by having Jada hug him in front of the staff, as a bid to get Darryl hired as the regional branch manager.
- Justine (Erica Vittina Phillips) is Darryl's ex-wife, whom he had been on bad terms with, even speaking crudely and poorly of her to Kevin, who repeats his remarks verbatim at a staff meeting. The two are parents to Jada. Their relationship seems to be initially terrible, with the two seemingly at odds with each other in "Classy Christmas", when Darryl blames Justine for not letting his daughter spend time with him on Christmas. However, the two seem to reconnect in "The Incentive", and begin dating, bringing joy to Darryl. But the relationship is short-lived when during "Lotto", Justine calls Darryl to personally congratulate a former warehouse employee working under Darryl. It's indicated that Justine was dating him before after having his number in her old cell phone, and asks Darryl for his number again. An offended Darryl hangs up on her. In "Spooked", it is confirmed that the two have split up yet again.
- Gwyneth Philbin (Jahmilla Jackson) is Darryl's younger sister, who closely resembles him. She makes her debut in the episode "The Meeting", in which Dwight and Toby, who are staking out by Darryl's house to investigate whether or not he is really on crutches and unable to work, see her walking around, and assume that it is Darryl. Toby then calls "him" an asshole, causing Gwyneth to turn around and the two to realize that it is not Darryl. She and her brother later confront the pair at the office, and Darryl exclaims that he is filing a complaint against them. She makes a cameo in "Training Day", where Darryl has her buy him cowboy attire and deliver it to him in the parking lot, after he learns that new branch manager Deangelo likes the Southwest.

=== Kevin's loved ones ===
- Stacey (Trish Gates) was Kevin's frequently mentioned, but rarely seen, fiancée. She was the fourth woman to whom Kevin proposed, but the first to accept. He was very happy about the outcome, although he secretly considered her a second choice to one of the other women, Melissa Riley. Stacey has one daughter, named Abby (portrayed by Greg Daniels' daughter, Haley Daniels), whom Kevin brings to the office, in the episode "Take Your Daughter to Work Day".

Stacey first appears in "The Dundies", attending the event of the same name, alongside Kevin. She later appears in the episodes "E-mail Surveillance", in which she attends Jim's barbecue party, and in "Phyllis' Wedding", in which she attends Phyllis' wedding. In "Valentine's Day", Kevin indicates that he and Stacey are beginning to have problems in their relationship, and admits that she will, at times, leave Scranton without telling him where she is going. Later, in the episode "Cocktails", Kevin claims that they have set a date for their wedding, but when Kelly asks him when the date is, he states that "It's complicated", and becomes very defensive about the subject. In "Chair Model", Kevin reveals that Stacey broke up with him, and that the two are on bad terms. In "Blood Drive", he reveals how Stacey ended their relationship: Kevin had casually told her that he believed that the Philadelphia Eagles could win the NFC East, and she abruptly stated "we're done".

- Lynn (Lisa K. Wyatt) is Kevin's love interest in the fifth season. She first appears in "Blood Drive", attending the singles mixer that Michael organizes. Kevin becomes attracted to her shortly after they meet, but is awkward talking to her. He later apologizes, stating that he becomes nervous around "pretty girls", which flatters her, and she gives him her e-mail address. In "Golden Ticket", Kevin is given greatly disparate advice on wooing her, but he ultimately succeeds when asks her to dinner and a movie. In "Cafe Disco", Lynn is seen passionately kissing him; however, in a deleted scene, Kevin tells the camera crew that he and Lynn had broken up. She is later mentioned in "The Delivery", when Kevin declares that, compared to Erin, "Lynn was way hotter".

=== Oscar's loved ones ===
- Gil (Tom Chick) is Oscar's former boyfriend. He first appears in the episode, "The Secret", when Dwight goes to Oscar's house to see if Oscar really is sick with the flu. Even though Oscar and Gil are obviously in a relationship, Dwight is oblivious to this. He reappears in "Gay Witch Hunt", during which, even though Michael had discovered that Oscar was gay, Michael believes that Gil is just Oscar's roommate. In order to make sure that Oscar does not sue the company after Michael reveals his sexuality to the staff, Jan gives Oscar a three-month paid vacation, and Oscar tells the camera crew that he and Gil will be traveling to Europe. Gil is later seen in "A Benihana Christmas", in which he and Oscar return to the office, but, upon seeing what the Christmas party is like, decide that it is "too soon" to return, and quietly leave, unnoticed by the staff. In "Business School", Gil and Oscar attend Pam's art show, but Gil expresses his disdain for her art, unaware that Pam is standing right behind him.

In "Beach Games", Oscar reveals that he is planning to end his relationship with Gil. Gil is not mentioned again until "Niagara", when Pam's sister, Penny, mistakes Kevin for him. The episode "Get the Girl" also implies that Oscar may regret his decision to break up with Gil, as he wistfully reminisces about the time when he and Gil were still together, and then sadly states that they "were so happy then".

=== Kelly's loved ones ===
- Ravi (Sendhil Ramamurthy) is a pediatrician and Kelly's boyfriend. His first appearance is in the eighth-season episode "Angry Andy", where Pam tells the camera crew that she set Ravi and Kelly up, in hopes of helping Kelly to forget about Ryan. Throughout the episode, Ryan makes several attempts to win Kelly back, eventually renting a horse and proclaiming his love to Kelly. She responds by saying she is in love with Ravi, but hopes to stay friends. They hug goodbye, but start passionately kissing. However, despite this, in "Free Family Portrait Studio", it is revealed that she is still dating Ravi, instead of Ryan. In the ninth-season premiere, "New Guys", Toby reveals to the film crew that Kelly and Ravi are now engaged and have moved to Ohio, after Ravi got a job as a pediatrics professor at Miami University. He returns in the series final as Kelly's fiancé, but she leaves him for Ryan, who distracts Ravi by giving his baby an allergic reaction. He later gives the baby to Kevin while he calls Child Services.

=== Stanley's family/loved ones ===
- Melissa Hudson (Jazz Raycole) is Stanley's teenage daughter from his first marriage. Her character is first seen in "Sexual Harassment", when Michael mistakenly refers to a photo of Melissa on Stanley's desk as a "centerfold in the Catholic schoolgirl's outfit." In "Take Your Daughter to Work Day", Stanley brings her to the office. She develops an infatuation with Ryan, which causes Kelly to become jealous. Kelly alerts Stanley, who screams at the terrified Ryan about his "motives". Melissa appears in a deleted scene from "Cocktails", where she comes to "Poor Richard's" and strikes up a conversation with Ryan, but he does not recognize her. Once Stanley notices the two talking, he begins yelling at Ryan.
- Terri Hudson (Joanne Carlsen) was Stanley's second and now ex-wife, who works as an interior decorator. In "The Dundies", Michael assumes that she is not Stanley's wife because she is white. In "Booze Cruise", she accompanies Stanley on the Booze Cruise boat. In "Phyllis' Wedding", she attends the wedding with Stanley. In "Stress Relief", she attends Michael's roast. "Take Your Daughter to Work Day" implies that Terri that she does not have a good relationship with her stepdaughter; when Pam mistakenly refers to Terri as her mother, Melissa becomes hostile and sharply corrects Pam.

In the sixth season premiere, Michael discovers that Stanley has been cheating on Terri with a woman named Cynthia. At the end of the episode, Michael talks to Terri on the phone and accidentally calls her Cynthia, which confirms her suspicions that Stanley is having an affair. It is presumed that she leaves him, as Stanley smashes Michael's car in anger; their separation is confirmed in later episodes, when he begins to date Cynthia publicly.

- Cynthia (Algerita Wynn Lewis) is the woman with whom Stanley has an affair. Originally, she was his nurse during his rehabilitation, but the two eventually developed a romance, despite their marriages. Soon after their affair is discovered, in "Gossip", Stanley decides to end their relationship, as he did not want to cheat on his wife any longer, but after Terri leaves him, he stays with Cynthia. She makes her first appearance in "Niagara", where she and Stanley attend Jim and Pam's wedding and both join in the dance down the aisle, and later reappears in "Andy's Play", attending a local production of Sweeney Todd, that Andy is performing in. In a deleted scene from the episode, she unintentionally makes Phyllis jealous by quickly forming a friendly relationship with Bob Vance, leading Phyllis to call her a "home-wrecking slut" in a talking-head interview. Cynthia also appears with Stanley in the episodes "Christening" and "Garden Party".

=== Phyllis' family ===
- Robert "Bob" Vance (Robert R. Shafer) is Phyllis Lapin-Vance's husband and the owner of Vance Refrigeration, a neighboring tenant in the office park. He often introduces himself as "Bob Vance, Vance Refrigeration" in order to plug his business. He is seen for the first time as Phyllis' boyfriend in "Christmas Party" and introduces himself to Kevin, Stanley, and Ryan in exactly that manner individually even though they were all standing next to each other. This leads Ryan to jokingly ask "So...what line of work are you in, Bob?" On Valentine's Day, he sent a number of gifts to Phyllis at the office—signed "Bob Vance, Vance Refrigeration". He also supplied a mini-fridge as a "Casino Night" prize. In "Gay Witch Hunt", Michael suggests that Phyllis may be a lesbian, at which point she announces that she and Bob are engaged. In "Initiation", he referred to Michael and Stanley as "a pair of Marys" after they ordered Phyllis to get to the back of the pretzel line, instead of letting her cut in with Bob. He is a friendly and helpful neighbor to Dunder Mifflin, including offering to pump the employees' car tires back full of air after Michael had flattened them in an attempt to create office camaraderie in "The Merger". When word gets out that the Scranton branch is shutting down, Bob offers to buy the Dunder Mifflin warehouse, therefore allowing all the workers there to keep their jobs. In "Ben Franklin" a bachelor party is held for him in the Dunder Mifflin warehouse before his wedding, but he refuses to be entertained by the stripper Michael hires. He marries Phyllis in "Phyllis' Wedding", to which all her coworkers are invited, and kicks Michael out after an embarrassing toast. Even in the wedding, he is referred to as "Bob Vance, Vance Refrigeration" during their vows. In a deleted scene from "Women's Appreciation", he comes to the Dunder Mifflin office to comfort Phyllis after she is flashed, then takes her for a walk to calm her nerves. He is portrayed as an attentive and dedicated husband who is deeply in love with Phyllis. In a deleted scene from the wedding episode, Phyllis mentions "baby mama drama" because Bob's other family from Ho Chi Minh City is coming in, but this has not been mentioned otherwise. In "Crime Aid", Bob attends Michael's auction intent on winning the Bruce Springsteen tickets, but after a spirited bidding war with Dwight, ends up buying a hug from Phyllis for $1000. In "Blood Drive", he refers to Michael, Dwight, and Andy as "that jackass", "that other jackass" and "that new jackass" respectively. In "Secret Santa", Phyllis threatens to "get Bob involved" to resolve her Santa role rivalry with Michael. Jim is confused about what Bob would do at first, but appears mildly alarmed when Phyllis recants, "Never mind, I shouldn't have said that". Bob makes a guest appearance in The Paper, revealing that Dunder Mifflin went out of business in 2019.
- Elbert Lapin (Hansford Rowe) is Phyllis' elderly, wheelchair user father. He appears in "Phyllis' Wedding", where he attends his daughter's wedding ceremony, and manages to build up the strength to walk Phyllis down the aisle, something which makes Michael feel upstaged, as he was pushing Elbert's wheelchair. Elbert's brother, Phyllis's Uncle Al, has dementia and is mistaken for a wedding crasher by Dwight in "Phyllis' Wedding". Additionally, Phyllis' mother is mentioned in "Garage Sale" when Phyllis tells Holly Flax that she has recently moved her into assisted living.

=== Meredith's family ===
- Jake Palmer (portrayed by Spencer Daniels) is Meredith's disrespectful and trouble-making son, whom she brings to the office in "Take Your Daughter to Work Day", after he is suspended from his school. During his time at the office, he is very rude to the staff, particularly Dwight, whom he addresses as "Mr. Poop". In order to demonstrate to Angela that he capable of enforcing discipline, Dwight is finally stern with Jake, calling him "a horrible little latchkey kid", something which upsets the child. Near the end of the episode, he appears to be somewhat humbled by Dwight's insult, and he bonds with Pam, declaring that her job as receptionist is "awesome". He is later mentioned in "Fun Run", when, after it is discovered Meredith has rabies, Dwight suggests that, instead of spending their money on a ceremony for Michael's fun run to raise awareness of the disease, they should instead put together a college fund for Jake. Michael then replies "Have you met that kid? He's not going to college". Jake reappears in a deleted scene from "Company Picnic", where Meredith brings him to the Dunder Mifflin company picnic, and, after he insults her, she locks him in her car for the remainder of the day. In "Get the Girl", Meredith reveals that Jake, at some point between the fifth and eighth seasons, has gotten a face tattoo. A now-adult Jake (now seen with Chinese symbols tattooed on his face and neck) makes a cameo in "Free Family Portrait Studio", taking a family portrait with Meredith. He angrily asks Meredith to just smile for the picture, but she snaps back that she does not want to. In the series finale, it's revealed that Jake has become a male stripper and performs at Angela's bachelorette party, which everyone but Meredith finds awkward.

=== Toby's family ===
- Sasha Flenderson (Delaney Ruth Farrell) is Toby's daughter, whom he often mentions. In "Take Your Daughter to Work Day", Toby brings her to the office, and she and Michael quickly bond. In "Moroccan Christmas", her voice is heard over the phone when Toby calls and asks her if she has ever heard of the "Princess Unicorn" doll. In a deleted scene from "WUPHF.com", a now-teenage Sasha appears in a web chat with her father, during which she unintentionally upsets him by revealing that her mother has a new boyfriend. Sasha later makes a cameo in "Free Family Portrait Studio", taking a family portrait with her father.
- Rory Flenderson (portrayed by writer and producer Warren Lieberstein, Paul Lieberstein's real life brother) is Toby's brother, who resides in Boulder, Colorado. He appears in "Goodbye, Michael", dressed similarly to his brother, in which he talks to Toby, via video chat, and gets excited about Michael moving to Colorado, after Toby tells him that he thinks, rather implausibly, the two would "hit it off, in an odd way".
- Kathy Becker is implied to be Toby's ex-wife. She never appears in the show. In , Toby said he was in the seminary and dropped out so he could have sex with a woman named Kathy. They married, had a daughter, eventually divorcing before the start of the series. While she is rarely referenced by name, Michael often pokes fun at the fact that Toby is a divorced man.

=== Jan's family ===
- Art Gould is Jan's ex-husband. Their separation is revealed in "The Client", with Jan eventually admitting that it was due to her desire to have children and his desire not to. In a deleted scene from "Performance Review", Michael calls Gould for advice on his "relationship" with Jan, but Gould is offended that Michael would call him about such an issue.
- Astrid Levinson, nicknamed "Assy" by her mother, is Jan's daughter, with whom she became impregnated from an artificial insemination via a sperm bank. Astrid is first seen when Jan brings her to the office in the episode "Baby Shower". In a deleted scene from the episode, Jan discovers that Kevin donated sperm to the same sperm bank she went to and is horrified at the possibility that he might be Astrid's biological father. Astrid is seen again in "Sex Ed", although she is considerably older than she was in her previous appearance.

=== Roy's family ===
- Kenny Anderson (Michael Patrick McGill) is Roy's brother. He is first mentioned in "The Client", when Pam reveals that he accompanied his brother on Roy and Pam's first date. He makes his first appearance in "Business School", attending Pam's art show, alongside Roy, and reappears in "Cocktails", in which he accompanies Roy to "Poor Richard's" for a night of drinking with Pam and her co-workers. When Pam confesses to Roy that Jim kissed her (in the episode "Casino Night"), Roy becomes enraged, and he and Kenny start wrecking the bar. To dissuade the owners from calling the police, Kenny pays them off with money he got from selling his Jet Skis. Years later, Kenny appears in "Roy's Wedding", where he tells his brother to "stop wasting time" talking with Jim (whom he refers to as "Haircut"), and rubs Roy's success in Jim's face by mentioning that he now owns a fifty-thousand dollar sports car.
- Lara (Sara Chase) is Roy's wife. The two married exactly a year after they met, in the episode "Roy's Wedding". In Roy's wedding toast, he reveals that when he first met Lara, he believed her to be his waitress, but three weeks later, she revealed to him that she was actually the owner of the establishment where he had been eating. In honor of her being his "beautiful mystery girl", he surprises her by revealing that he has learned to play piano, and performs "She's Got a Way" by Billy Joel for her.

=== Karen's family ===
- Dan (portrayed by Dan Goor) is Karen's husband, who works as a dermatologist. The two met in a bar, and they later married after Karen was transferred to the Utica branch. By the time of the episode "Lecture Circuit", Karen is already eight months pregnant with his child. Dan later makes a cameo in the episode "Threat Level Midnight"; he can be seen very briefly in the background during Karen's talking-head interview.

=== Holly's family ===
- Mr. and Mrs. Flax (voiced by uncredited actors) are Holly's parents, who reside in Boulder, Colorado. Mr. Flax is also the reason that Holly and Michael move to Colorado, as, during a phone conversation, she notices that he seems mentally disoriented.

=== David Wallace's family ===
- Rachel Wallace (Jean Villepique) is David Wallace's wife. She first appears in "Cocktails", in which she is forced to deal with Michael and Dwight's antics, and later reappears in "Sabre", in which it is implied that her relationship with David has been strained since he was fired from Dunder Mifflin.
- Teddy Wallace (portrayed by Greg Daniels's son, Owen Daniels), is David and Rachel's young son. He makes his first appearance in "Cocktails", and later reappears in "Sabre", in which he loudly plays his drum set during Michael's visit to David's house.

=== Robert California's family ===
- Susan California (Maura Tierney) is Robert's third and now ex-wife. She appears in the episode "Mrs. California", in which she arrives at the office, looking for a job. However, unbeknownst to her, Robert secretly orders Andy not to hire her. After she requests a job as an Accountant, Andy claims that the office is already fully staffed, but, in contrast to his previous request, Robert insists that she be given a job, which Andy does, much to Robert's dismay. Later, she eventually realizes that Robert did not want her working at the office, and the two end up in a discussion about his dishonesty. Later, after work, she meets Andy in the parking lot, and, to his surprise, she asks him out on a date. In the subsequent episode, "Pool Party", it is revealed that Susan and Robert are getting divorced. In her debut episode, Susan notes in an interview that she met Robert when she was a secretary at a company he acquired, and that he cheated on his second wife when they began seeing each other.
- Bert California (David Mazouz) is Robert's adolescent son, who shares some of his father's peculiar personality traits. He appears in "Spooked", in which he accompanies Robert to the office Halloween party, and soon bonds with Dwight, due to their similar interests and opinions.

== Other characters ==
=== Hank Tate ===
Hank Tate (Hugh Dane), also known as Hank the security guard, is head of security at the office park. Hank is quiet and stern, and unenthusiastically carries out his duties from his desk at the front door of the office park. Since Dwight purchased the building, Hank's duties have expanded to include running “Dwight’s Caffeine Corner” the ramshackle coffee counter that was installed in the lobby which serves coffee and baked goods for unreasonable prices. He is first seen sitting at his desk as Michael exits the building at the end of "Halloween". In "Drug Testing", Michael "pulls a few strings" and makes Dwight official Security Supervisor for the Dunder Mifflin Scranton branch. In "Night Out", Jim forgets to let Hank know that the office workers would be working late and Hank locks them and their cars behind the parking lot's gate. Unsure of Hank's name, Jim calls Hank's number on Toby's cell phone to ask him to come and unlock the gate. The other office workers realize that they never tipped Hank last Christmas (Jim forgot to collect it) and Hank will probably not come help them. Later, the Scranton Business Park cleaning crew arrives to unlock the gate, and Hank arrives some time later to find everyone had left without notifying him. When Toby Flenderson leaves the office at the end of Season 4, Michael brings Hank to escort him out, to Toby's annoyance. He plays the guitar in "Crime Aid" while selling CD's to help repay for the robbery; he uses the stage name "Hank Doyle". Hank is also called upon by Michael to decide what the Dunder Mifflin staff should do with extra money in "The Surplus" but is abruptly dismissed after not being able to make a quick decision. During "Two Weeks", Hank is ordered by Charles Miner to physically remove Michael from the office, which becomes slightly awkward for Hank. He also owns a 1/8 share of a rental property in Pittson, of which Dwight is 1/8 proud. During the Finale Table Read on the Season 9 DVD, Hank's last name is said to be "Doyle".

Hank was heavily featured in a deleted cold open intended for the series finale. The scene, which was cut due to its length, sees Hank play "Dorpheus" in an elaborate prank by Jim and Pam to trick Dwight into believing the Matrix is real. The plan backfires, however, when Dwight elects to take the blue pill rather than the red pill as Jim expected. The complete, deleted scene was released on YouTube on January 1, 2021, and features a dedication at the end to the since deceased Hugh Dane.

=== Billy Merchant ===
William "Billy" Merchant (Marcus A. York) is the property manager of Scranton Business Park, the office park in which the Dunder-Mifflin Scranton branch office is located. Billy is physically disabled, and has used a wheelchair since the age of four. Throughout his appearances, he is seen as a calm and professional man, and seems to disregard Michael's immaturity and rudeness, while still extending generosity to him. He first appears in "The Injury", in which Michael, after having burned his foot on a George Foreman Grill, invites Billy to the office to speak about being disabled. While there, Michael's remarks offend Billy, causing him to leave, and while departing, he informs Jim that Dwight might have a serious concussion. Billy reappears in the episode "Casino Night", attending the event of the same name, with his girlfriend, whom Michael mistakes for his nurse. In "Initiation", it is revealed that, once a year, Billy arranges for a pretzel cart to be brought into the lobby of the Scranton Business Park to give away free pretzels, "as a thank-you for [the] loyal tenants". In "Fun Run", he participates in Michael's fun run, and eventually passes Michael, later in the race. In "Dream Team", he assists Michael in setting up an office (which is essentially a janitorial closet) for his new paper company. Billy is neither mentioned nor seen after Dwight purchased the building at end of Season 6. Billy shares his last name with original series co-creator Stephen Merchant.

=== Leo and Gino ===
Leo and Gino (portrayed by writers Gene Stupnitsky and Lee Eisenberg, respectively) are deliverymen for Vance Refrigeration. The two first appear in a deleted scene from "Halloween", in which they attempt to gain the attention of the camera crew, while riding in an elevator with Michael, and reappear in "Valentine's Day", delivering Phyllis's Valentine's Day gifts from Bob Vance, and, in a deleted scene, flirting with Pam. In a deleted scene from "Drug Testing", it is revealed that Leo and Gino were responsible for smoking the joint that was found in the parking lot. In "Goodbye, Toby", the two assist Phyllis in organizing Toby's farewell party. In "Frame Toby", they con Michael out of 500 dollars by selling him what he believes to be marijuana, but is actually a bag of Caprese salad. In "Cafe Disco", when Kelly and Erin start dancing in Michael's Cafe Disco, Leo and Gino are shown to be eager to dance with them. Gino also makes a cameo appearance in "Threat Level Midnight", acting in Michael's movie of the same name, portraying a bar patron.

=== Brenda Matlowe ===
Brenda Matlowe (Brenda Withers) is a corporate trainer, who is sent to the Scranton branch to evaluate Michael's "Leadership Training Exercise", in the episode "Booze Cruise". In "The Carpet", Jim leaves her a voicemail, in which he asks her out on a date. In a deleted scene from "Drug Testing", she calls Jim back. However, as he is jinxed by Pam, he cannot answer. In a talking-head interview, he writes on a piece of paper, "She'll call back". Brenda was not referenced again for the remainder of the show.

=== Vikram ===
Vikram (Ranjit Chowdhry) is a sales representative who worked with Michael at the Lipophedrine diet pill telemarketing company. Vikram is Indian and claims he was a surgeon back in India. He is a wise and diligent worker, seen winning the sales bonus at the telemarketing company and concerned about losing prime selling hours during his brief membership in the Michael Scott Paper Company. He is first seen in the episode "Money" when Michael tries telemarketing at night to earn extra income. He is friendly towards Michael, sharing his dinners and giving him good advice. Michael later recruits Vikram to work in his own company in "Dream Team" only to have Vikram give up on the idea and return to his job after finding out how ill-conceived Michael's plan was.

=== Al Brown ===
Al Brown (Note: Mr. Brown's first name is Al. In "Diversity Day", Michael says "Hey, Al, can I help you out in there?") (played by producer/writer Larry Wilmore) is a consultant sent by corporate to mediate a healthy discussion of diversity issues with the office staff after receiving complaints about Michael's inflammatory impersonation of a Chris Rock speech, in the episode "Diversity Day". Mr. Brown is later seen in "Gay Witch Hunt", giving the Stamford branch the same diversity training he gave the Scranton Branch; he alludes to incidents at the Scranton branch as the reason he is in Stamford.

=== Elizabeth ===
Elizabeth (Jackie Debatin) is a stripper whom Dwight hired to be the "entertainment" at Bob Vance's bachelor party in "Ben Franklin". After both Bob and Michael refuse to accept lap dances from her, Dwight has her sit at Oscar's vacant desk to answer phones for the day. When Michael feels bad about betraying Jan, he asks Elizabeth (referring to her as "stripper") whether he should tell her. She replies, "Secret secrets are no fun, secret secrets hurt someone". When the office needs a medical person to receive a check for the proceeds of their fund-raiser, Elizabeth is hired to come back dressed as a "nurse" and receive Michael's check to help cure rabies during the Season 4 opener, "Fun Run". She is later seen flirting with Darryl. She returns in the series finale as the stripper at Dwight's bachelor party, and Dwight confuses her for a waitress.

=== Fern Widgale ===
Fern Widgale (portrayed by Office showrunner, writer and series developer Greg Daniels) is Michael's snippety neighbor who resides in a condominium near Michael's former one. He appears in a deleted scene from the episode "Office Olympics", in which he encounters Michael and Dwight, and is perturbed by Michael's personality. When asked what his profession is, he replies that he sells yarn, something that Michael and Dwight cannot help laughing at.

In a 2008 Office Comic Con panel, it was revealed that Fern is gay, and writer Lester Lewis stated that he portrayed the character's boyfriend, but that his part was cut.

There is a child actor in Threat Level Midnight with a similar name (Ferd Winkdale).

=== The Prince Family ===
The Prince Family, consisting of members Roger Prince, Sr. (Dan Desmond), who started the company after returning from the Vietnam War; his wife Linda (Sharon Blackwood); their son Roger Jr. (Dan Bakkedahl), and Roger Jr.'s young daughter Rebecca (Emily Rae Argenti), operate a rival paper company somewhere near the Scranton region. In "Prince Family Paper", David Wallace asks Michael to investigate Prince Paper; when Michael visits the company, posing as a potential customer, the remarkably kind and overly trusting family gives him a list of their best clients to use as a reference, which Dwight eventually coerces Michael to send to David Wallace. In "Two Weeks", Michael calls Prince Paper, and is greeted with a voicemail recording revealing that the company has gone out of business.

=== Brandon ===
Brandon (Jerry Minor) is Val's boyfriend. Brandon owns his own restaurant, and is prone to extreme agitation and jealously if he thinks someone is attempting to court Val. He is first introduced in "Special Project", when he calls Darryl asking for the address of the Warehouse, so that he may send flowers to his girlfriend. However, Val later tells Darryl that the flowers were from her mother, despite him pointing out the caller had had a deep voice and said his name was Brandon, possibly indicating that Val is interested in Darryl. Brandon makes his first appearance in "After Hours", in which he arrives at the office and accuses Darryl of having an affair with Val, after having read Darryl's text messages to her, although Val eventually convinces him there is nothing going on between her and Darryl. Brandon reappears in "Free Family Portrait Studio", in which he visits Val at the Warehouse, and overhears Darryl talking positively about her. Once again, he accuses him of being interested in her, but this time, Darryl admits to pursuing her. Later in the episode, Val joins Darryl and his daughter when they are having their family portrait taken, and she takes his hand in hers, suggesting that she is leaving Brandon for him. This is confirmed in the subsequent season, during which she is shown to be dating Darryl.

=== Justin Spitzer ===
Justin Spitzer (Stephen Saux) is a character first seen on a date at the Hibachi table in the episode "A Benihana Christmas". In "Crime Aid", Justin bids in the warehouse auction and he can also be seen in "Goodbye, Michael", exiting the elevator with a delivery man as Michael leaves the office for the last time. This character was named after The Office writer Justin Spitzer, who went on to create and produce the NBC sitcom Superstore.

=== Megan ===
Megan (Elvy Yost) is a high school student, who appears in a deleted scene from the episode "Job Fair", where she is interested in an internship at Dunder Mifflin, but turned away by Oscar, who is attempting to spare her from the presumed misery she would endure by working at the office. She later reappears in "Gossip", as one of the three summer interns at the Scranton branch, where, true to Oscar's prediction, she, along with her fellow interns, has the antics of the staff.

=== Deborah Shoshlefski ===
Deborah Shoshlefski (April Eden) was a model, with whom Michael became enamored, in the episode "Chair Model", after seeing her in an office supply catalog. Dwight tracks her down for him, but discovers that she is now deceased, having crashed her car into an airplane hangar while under the influence of cannabis. Michael is devastated by the news, and, wanting closure, later visits her gravesite along with Dwight (which culminates with the two singing "American Pie" together throughout the night and unintentionally dancing on her grave).

According to her tombstone, she was born in 1966, and died in 2003.

=== Tom Witochkin ===
Tom Witochkin (Greg Tuculescu) is a former childhood friend of Jim's. He appears in "The Seminar", attending Andy's seminar on starting a small business, where his presence causes Jim, who was originally one of the guest speakers, to abruptly pull out and spend all day outside of the office. Pam later forces him to explain why he is acting so strange, and he reveals Tom's past friendship with him, and that he and Tom were placed in separate reading groups in school, with Jim being in the superior one. After his mother told him to spend time with his "smart" friends, Jim told Tom that his mother "thinks [he's] too dumb to hang out with". Jim eventually bumps into him in the break room, and attempts to laugh off their history, but Tom mocks Jim for not being as successful as his superior intellect would have indicated, using the snarky remark, "Where's your jet pack, Zuckerberg?".

=== The Scranton Strangler ===
George Howard Skub, nicknamed "The Scranton Strangler" by the media, is a serial killer who, as his moniker would suggest, strangles his victims. Although never seen on-screen, he has been referred to several times, starting with the sixth season episode "The Delivery", in which a newspaper headline reads "The Scranton Strangler Strikes Again". In a deleted scene from "Happy Hour", Michael tries to impersonate the Scranton Strangler to impress Pam's friend. In "Body Language", Dwight talks to Kelly about the best possible move to fight the Scranton Strangler. In the seventh season episode "Costume Contest", Dwight dresses like the Strangler for Halloween. In the opening of "Viewing Party", the office staff are watching a live broadcast of a police chase of the Scranton Strangler, and they get excited when the cars pass by on the road in front of the office building. In "Classy Christmas", Toby is chosen as a juror for the Scranton Strangler's trial, which forces him to take a leave of absence and results in Holly Flax being appointed his temporary replacement. In "Michael's Last Dundies", Toby states that the man he helped convict as the Scranton Strangler has been sentenced to the death penalty, but that Toby is starting to have second thoughts about whether or not the man was actually guilty. The Strangler is not mentioned again until the ninth season Christmas episode "Dwight Christmas", in which Toby reveals the name of the convicted murderer, whom he still believes to be innocent. A few episodes later, however, in "Moving On", after Nellie tells Toby to either do something about it or stop talking, he goes to see Skub in prison, and is nearly strangled, finally putting to rest the mystery of whether the right man was convicted.

=== Gordon ===
Gordon (Andrew Daly) is an impersonator hired by Jim to portray Ben Franklin in the eponymous episode. He is introduced by Michael to the female staff, during which he mistakenly remarks that Ben Franklin was a president. Gordon, in character, replies "I never was president", but Michael insists that Ben Franklin was, thinking that Gordon is breaking character. Initially underwhelmed by his presence, the ladies find Gordon quite fun. Jim tries to convince Dwight that Gordon is the real Ben Franklin; to prove Jim wrong, Dwight asks Gordon questions relevant to Franklin’s time, but Gordon answers without hesitation. Gordon breaks character in order to hit on Pam, but Pam is not interested.

=== The documentary film crew ===
The documentary film crew is a camera crew that has been filming the lives of the Dunder Mifflin Scranton branch employees since the beginning of the series. Their presence has been met with widely different reactions and levels of comfort from the people they film, although, over the course of the series, the staff has gradually grown to accept the crew's presence as a part of their environment.

The crew often intrudes on the personal lives of the office workers, such as filming at social or private events, and have been known to take rather extreme measures in order to capture footage, sometimes secretly filming the employees, even if they tell the crew that they do not want to be on camera. While they mainly observe the action around them, the camera operators have, on occasion, intervened, such as when Pam asks one to alert her if they see any indications to suggest that Dwight and Angela are in a relationship, which the camera operator does, or when the crew shows Jim and Pam recent footage of the two kissing, in order to elicit an explanation from them. However, they have also done the exact opposite, even in critical situations, such as when Dwight tricks his co-workers into believing that the building is on fire, and the crew neglects to inform everyone that it is just a safety drill even though it results in a massive panic, and a member of the crew gets trampled by the staff.

While they remain mostly unseen, the crew members have appeared in the background in the episodes "Health Care", "Office Olympics", "The Fire", "The Fight", "The Secret", "Branch Wars","Survivor Man", and "Customer Survey". The ninth-season premiere marked the first time the audience has heard one of them speak, as when Pam and Jim finish their interview outlining their summer, Pam brings up the crew's lengthy stay at the office, asking the cameraman "Don't you guys have everything? I mean, it's just a paper company", to which the interviewer (voiced by David Rogers) replies "Well, we're more following you guys, to see how you turn out".

During a 2007 Writer's Block Question and Answer session at The Office Convention, the writers half-jokingly suggested that the original reason for the camera crew filming the staff's lives was to see how the Dunder Mifflin Scranton branch handled the suicide of a co-worker (that employee being Tom Peets), but the crew changed its focus upon realizing that the daily events in the office would make a more captivating documentary.

=== Brian ===
Brian (Chris Diamantopoulos) was the film crew's boom operator. He was not seen until the episode "Customer Loyalty", in which he comforts a tearful Pam after a fight with Jim, ordering the cameras to be shut off while doing so. In “Junior Salesman”, Pam apologizes to him, as his actions caused him to be reprimanded by his superiors, although he tells her not to feel guilty about it. In "Vandalism", Brian is fired from the documentary after breaking protocol by hitting the warehouse worker Frank across the face with his mic when it appears that he is going to physically assault Pam. Shortly after his termination, he tells Pam that, should she ever need anything, to just let him know, leaving her grateful, but confused. In "Couples Discount", the Halperts plan to have lunch with Brian and his wife, Alyssa, to thank him for protecting Pam from Frank. When they arrive, they are surprised to be meeting only with Brian, who reveals that he is getting a divorce. He and his wife had been fighting for a while. In "Promos", Pam visits Brian at his apartment, and tells him that upon seeing the old footage she thinks Jim's feelings for her have largely faded, and Brian agrees. When she asks about what the crew filmed, he tells her that every important moment was captured even when not wearing their microphones. Realizing the extent to which their privacy has been violated, Pam storms out of Brian's house.
