= Launch Party =

- The Office episodes
- Episode nos.: Season 4 Episodes 5/6
- Directed by: Ken Whittingham
- Written by: Jennifer Celotta
- Cinematography by: Randall Einhorn
- Editing by: David Rogers
- Production code: 405/406
- Original air date: October 11, 2007
- Running time: 42 minutes

Guest appearance
- Kevin McHale as Pizza delivery boy

Episode chronology
← Previous "Dunder Mifflin Infinity"	Next → "Money"
- The Office (American season 4)

"Launch Party" is the fifth and sixth episode of the fourth season of the American comedy television series The Office and the show's fifty-eighth and fifty-ninth episode overall. The episode was written by Jennifer Celotta and directed by Ken Whittingham. It first aired in the United States on October 11, 2007, on NBC.

In this episode, Dunder Mifflin prepares for the launch of their new website. Dwight tries to outsell the website, Andy makes a move for Angela, and Michael kidnaps a pizza delivery boy (Kevin McHale).

== Plot ==
Dunder Mifflin is preparing a launch party for their new website. Jan Levinson does not want to go so Michael Scott invites Pam Beesly, who makes Jim Halpert take her place. Only after they reach New Jersey does Jim realize that Michael received an invitation to a chat room, not the actual party. Michael returns to Scranton and orders a better party, irritating party planner Angela Martin, already irritable due to the death of her cat. She takes out her frustrations on fellow Party Planning Committee member Phyllis, who quits the committee.

After Ryan Howard's prediction that the website will become Dunder Mifflin's top salesperson by the end of the day is announced, Dwight Schrute vies to win back Angela's affection by outselling the website. Andy Bernard keeps a tally of reams sold, blowing an airhorn whenever Dwight makes a sale. Jim and Pam send Dwight instant messages pretending to be the website having achieved self-awareness and become resolved to outsell Dwight. Dwight wins the challenge, and he gloats to Angela. Frustrated at Dwight's persistent refusal to accept that they are broken up for good, she loudly asks Pam to set her up with a friend of hers. Ashamed of having pranked Dwight in the middle of a breakup, Pam sends a message as the website conceding victory to Dwight. Andy sets up a conference call with his old Cornell friends to serenade Angela with "Take a Chance on Me". She excuses herself without giving Andy a response.

Put out at not being invited to the party, on the chat room Michael snaps that Dwight outsold the website and curses at Ryan. Everyone complains that Michael confused the office's favorite pizza place, Alfredo's Pizza Cafe, with a terrible pizza place, Pizza by Alfredo. When his coupon is refused he holds the teenaged delivery driver hostage. Eventually realizing he is breaking the law he lets the child go, then crashes the party in New York City with Dwight. Michael is cheered when a young corporate worker says he liked his rant against Ryan. Michael and Dwight amuse themselves by poking fun at Ryan, but when Michael mentions how "hot" Ryan is it becomes awkward, and the two head home.

== Production ==
"Launch Party" was the sixth episode of the series directed by Ken Whittingham. Whittingham had previously directed "Health Care", "Michael's Birthday", "The Convention", "The Merger", and "Phyllis' Wedding". "Launch Party" was written by Jennifer Celotta, making it the sixth episode written by her.

According to Jennifer Celotta, the idea for the first scene of the episode where the office workers are watching a logo bounce around a television screen, came when the writers were in a room watching the DVD logo bounce around the television screen, and were arguing about whether it would ever hit the corner.

== Reception ==
"Launch Party" received a 5.2 Nielsen Rating and an 8% Share. The episode was watched by 8.91 million viewers and achieved a 4.7/11 in the key adults 18–49 demographic.

"Launch Party" received mixed reviews from critics. TV Squad's Jay Black wondered why the writers "feel the need to veer off into increasingly more ridiculous places", especially because The Office is "hailed by critics and adored by fans for its ability to find humor in the smallest pieces of real-life human interaction". Black did say that except for the kidnapping, he "thought tonight's episode was the best of the season." Travis Fickett of IGN wrote that "Launch Party" was "a very entertaining episode with some terrific moments." Fickett did say that with all the hour-long episodes "things start to feel stretched and some scenes take on a sense of redundancy and certain storylines seem to peter out before they even get going."
