= Fun Run =

- The Office episodes
- Episode nos.: Season 4 Episodes 1/2
- Directed by: Greg Daniels
- Written by: Greg Daniels
- Cinematography by: Randall Einhorn
- Editing by: David Rogers
- Production codes: 401 (ep. 1); 402 (ep. 2)
- Original air date: September 27, 2007
- Running time: 42 minutes

Guest appearances
- Rashida Jones as Karen Filippelli; Bobby Ray Shafer as Bob Vance; Marcus York as Billy Merchant; Jackie Debatin as Elizabeth

Episode chronology
← Previous "The Job"	Next → "Dunder Mifflin Infinity"
- The Office (American season 4)

"Fun Run" is the first and second episode of the fourth season of the American comedy television series The Office and the show's fifty-fourth and fifty-fifth episode overall. Written and directed by executive producer and showrunner Greg Daniels, the episode first aired on NBC in the United States on September 27, 2007.

In the episode, Michael Scott (Steve Carell) believes the office is cursed after he accidentally hits Meredith Palmer (Kate Flannery) with his car. After being taken to the hospital, Meredith is found to have possibly been exposed to rabies. In an attempt to make amends with Meredith, Michael sponsors a fun run for rabies. Meanwhile, Jim Halpert (John Krasinski) and Pam Beesly (Jenna Fischer) take steps to keep their dating a secret, while Angela Martin (Angela Kinsey) is mad at Dwight Schrute (Rainn Wilson) for killing her cat Sprinkles.

The episodes received mixed reviews from critics. While most praised the episode for Jim and Pam's relationship, critics had differing opinions when it came to how Michael behaved.

== Plot ==
Over the summer, Jan Levinson moved in with Michael Scott; Ryan Howard started his new job at Corporate; and Jim Halpert broke up with Karen Filippelli, who left Dunder Mifflin Scranton. Jim and Pam Beesly claim that they see each other socially but only as friends. The documentary crew catches Pam picking up Jim in her car. They kiss and drive away. When faced with the footage of them kissing, Jim and Pam admit to the documentary crew that they are secretly dating.

As he arrives at work, Michael accidentally hits Meredith Palmer with his car, sending her to the hospital for a fractured pelvis. Forced to join a group visit to Meredith in the hospital, Angela Martin leaves Dwight Schrute with complicated instructions on the care of her ailing cat, Sprinkles. During the hospital visit, Michael fails to obtain forgiveness from Meredith. When Angela returns to the office, Dwight tells her Sprinkles was dead when he arrived, but Angela becomes suspicious upon finding Sprinkles's corpse in the freezer with her bags of frozen french fries ripped to shreds, and orders an autopsy. Dwight confesses he killed her cat because it served no utilitarian purpose, unlike the farm animals he is accustomed to. Angela is furious.

The combination of Meredith's accident, Sprinkles' death, and a virus on Pam's computer (which is cleaned by the company's tech support employee, Sadiq) convinces Michael that the office is cursed. Dwight discovers that Meredith has had a precautionary rabies shot due to bat bites that she received in "Business School". Michael takes credit for saving Meredith's life by sending her to the hospital and declares the curse over. However, still feeling guilty about hurting Meredith, Michael organizes a charity five-kilometer (3.1 mile) fun run to raise awareness of rabies. Over half of the money raised is spent on the check presentation ceremony. While Michael is getting changed for the race, Pam sees his genitals. Few take the race seriously: Creed, Oscar and Stanley sneak off to a bar; Jim and Pam visit a garage sale; Toby Flenderson finishes first. Michael becomes ill, having "carbo-loaded", as he ate fettuccine Alfredo before the race and abstained from water. In the hospital for dehydration, Michael is visited by Meredith. In recognition of his efforts, she forgives him, and they share a lollipop.

== Production ==
"Fun Run" was the eighth episode of the series written by Greg Daniels and ninth episode directed by him. The episode was the second of the series in which Daniels was both the writer and director. Daniels also wrote and directed the first season episode "Basketball".

After initially reading the script, Kate Flannery asked producer Kent Zbornak if Meredith was going to live, to which he replied "This isn't All My Children." Flannery was nervous about doing her own stunt, so Zbornak did it first to show her that she would be fine. Flannery recalls "[I] kind of got competitive with him, and I thought, 'I can do that. I can do that better than he can.'" At first, Flannery would flinch before hitting the glass, until director Greg Daniels was able to get her to not think about it. Flannery's arms were bruised, due to having to film the scene multiple times. During the hospital scenes, Flannery and Steve Carell improvised a few times.

== Reception ==
The episodes received mixed reviews. Pam and Jim finally getting together went over well with most critics. Zap2It's Rick Porter thought "the show handled the PB&J (Pam Beesly and Jim) stuff as well as it always has, underplaying the romance as much as the NBC marketing folks overplay it." Although Christine Fenno from Entertainment Weekly was happy about Pam and Jim finally dating, she criticized their secrecy as too small of an obstacle for the arc. TV Guide's Jack Rodgers was glad "the writers aren't jerking us around anymore, and the pair are finally busted when Jim hops a ride home with Pam after work".

Reviews for Michael in this episode were a little bit more mixed. Rick Porter said that "there was a little too much Bad Michael in the hour for my taste". Travis Fickett of IGN disagreed, saying that "the best stuff in the episode comes from Steve Carell. There's his reaction to hitting Meredith, how he breaks it to the office, and his fear that the office is cursed." Will Leitch, a writer for New York, said that Michael hitting Meredith with his car was "one of the most shocking moments in the show’s history" and "nothing that came afterwards could quite top what happened in the first 25 seconds".
