= The Convention (The Office) =

- The Office episode
- Episode no.: Season 3 Episode 2
- Directed by: Ken Whittingham
- Written by: Gene Stupnitsky; Lee Eisenberg
- Cinematography by: Randall Einhorn
- Editing by: Dean Holland
- Production code: 306
- Original air date: September 28, 2006
- Running time: 22 minutes

Guest appearances
- Jerome Bettis as himself; Creed Bratton as Creed Bratton; Charles Esten as Josh Porter; Robert Bagnell as Alan; Matt Price as Evan

Episode chronology
← Previous "Gay Witch Hunt"	Next → "The Coup"
- The Office (American season 3)

"The Convention" is the second episode of the third season of the American comedy television series The Office and the show's thirtieth episode overall. The episode was written by Gene Stupnitsky and Lee Eisenberg, and directed by Ken Whittingham. It first aired on September 28, 2006 on NBC in the United States.

In the episode, Michael Scott (Steve Carell) and Dwight Schrute (Rainn Wilson) from the Scranton branch of Dunder Mifflin, as well as Josh Porter (Charles Esten) and Jim Halpert (John Krasinski) from the Stamford branch, leave for Philadelphia for the annual office supply convention. Michael, angry at both Jim for leaving the Scranton branch and Josh for being a better boss than him, tries to one-up Josh at every opportunity. Meanwhile, Kelly Kapoor (Mindy Kaling) sets up Pam Beesly (Jenna Fischer) on a double date with her neighbor which goes nowhere. The episode introduces Toby Flenderson's (Paul Lieberstein) unrequited crush on Pam.

The first draft of the script included a scene suggesting that Angela Martin (Angela Kinsey) was pregnant with Dwight's child, but this was cut by showrunner Greg Daniels. Initially, there were plans for the cast members from the British version of The Office to appear in this episode, but due to scheduling conflicts, this fell through. The episode was seen by an estimated 7.8 million viewers according to Nielsen Media Research. It was received generally well by critics.

== Plot ==
Michael Scott and Dwight Schrute from the Scranton branch of Dunder Mifflin, Josh Porter and Jim Halpert from the Stamford branch, and Jan Levinson from the corporate headquarters all descend upon Philadelphia for the annual office supply convention. Michael is bitter that Jim left Scranton for Stamford and tries to one-up Josh at every opportunity. Josh also patronizes Michael by saying he would look for a job for him in sales if Stamford absorbs the Scranton branch, angering Michael even further. Michael also spreads the word that he is throwing a party in his hotel room that night. Later in the evening, Michael surprises everyone with the news that he has broken Staples' exclusive hold on Hammermill products. Meanwhile, Angela Martin follows Dwight to the convention and waits in his hotel room. Hoping to prank Dwight, Jim acquires a key to his hotel room. Upon opening the door, he hears and sees Angela without recognizing her; Jim thinks she is a prostitute Dwight ordered, and is frustrated that due to his transfer, there is no one he can gossip with about this.

Back in Scranton, Kelly Kapoor sets Pam Beesly up on a double date with her neighbor Alan, a cartoonist for the local newspaper. However, Kelly is quietly disappointed that Pam intends to wear just her normal work clothes to the date. On the double date, Kelly appears to be the only one having a good time, with Ryan Howard annoyed by Kelly force feeding him french fries and Pam awkwardly chatting with Alan. Pam and Alan fail to hit it off. At Michael's party, Jim attends as the only guest and explains that he did not leave Scranton because of Michael (whom Jim claims is a great boss), but rather because of Pam, who rejected Jim (twice); Michael suggests Jim talk to Roy about the situation, as he too was rejected by Pam. The two mend their friendship just as two other guests arrive.

== Production ==
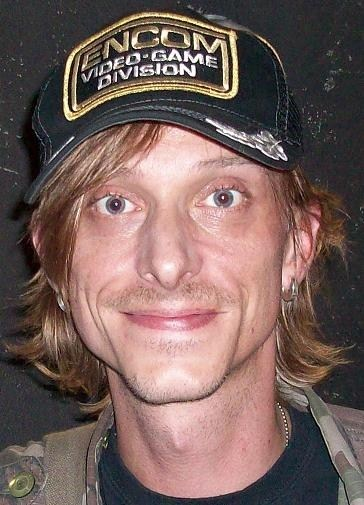
Executive producer and showrunner of The Office Greg Daniels had hoped to get cast members from the original British Office series, such as Mackenzie Crook (pictured) to appear in the episode.

"The Convention" was the fourth episode of the series written by the writing team of Gene Stupnitsky and Lee Eisenberg, and the third episode of the series directed by Ken Whittingham. This episode originally had a scene with Angela and Dwight in the office kitchen. Producer Greg Daniels stated: "They had a couple lines, there was a pause, and then Angela said, 'I'm late,' turned around, and left." This would imply that she may be pregnant. The scene was cut because Daniels ultimately concluded, "It was a big move, but we had it in a show that had a lot of other big moves." Dwight actor Rainn Wilson liked the cut scene, commenting, "It was so daring. I mean, you don't introduce a C plotline of an illicit office romance and then all of a sudden have one of the characters get knocked up!"

Greg Daniels, executive producer and showrunner of The Office, had hoped to get Mackenzie Crook, Martin Freeman, and Lucy Davis from the original British Office series to appear in the episode as their respective characters (Gareth Keenan, Tim Canterbury, and Dawn Tinsley), but he was unsuccessful due to scheduling conflicts.

The third season DVD contains a number of deleted scenes from the episode, including Michael unsuccessfully inviting Ryan to attend the convention, Michael reminiscing on being abandoned by Todd Packer at a club and being attacked by bouncers, Michael telling Dwight he almost worked at a local factory, Dwight asking Josh if he has ever been convicted of a felony, Dwight asking Josh about his experiences in the coast guard and in Israel, and Dwight leaving Michael to go see Angela.

== Reception ==
"The Convention" received a 3.8/10 in the Nielsen ratings among persons aged 18–49, meaning that 3.8 percent of all people aged 18–49 watched the episode, and ten percent of all people in the age group watching TV at the time watched the episode. It received an estimated audience of 7.8 million viewers overall, and ranked #1 in its time period among men 18–34.

The episode was received generally well by critics. Abby West of Entertainment Weekly praised the interactions between characters as some of the highlights of the episode, stating "Jim is the show's salt — he makes everyone else seem just a little better. He's the perfect straight man to showcase Michael's insanity". Brian Zoromski of IGN stated that:

Any episode that places Michael and Dwight outside of their normal office environment is set up for some very funny (and usually awkward) situations and "The Convention" is no exception. Some of the episode's best uncomfortable moments centered on Michael believing he's the life of the party and that he's Jim's friend. Michael and Dwight pretending to laugh along to an inside joke made by Jim's new boss, Josh, is a prime example. Michael's comment, "I love inside jokes. Love to be part of one someday," creates the kind of uncomfortable silence that The Office excels at.

Erik Adams of The A.V. Club awarded the episode a "B", writing that along with "Gay Witch Hunt", this episode is evident that Jim's transfer to Stamford "disrupts 'some of the show's best character pairings'". He argues that, while this episode exists little more than a way for Michael and Jim to repair their friendship, the interaction between Carell and Krasinski at the episode's conclusion is worthy of applause. Adams also suggests that the episode's main theme is one of isolation, pointing out that both Dwight and Michael feel alone and cut-off from others even in the midst of a massive convention, and that Pam feels "marooned" back in Scranton. These feelings feed into the main themes of season three, which, according to Adams, are "distance, separation, and reunion".
