= Money (The Office) =

- The Office episodes
- Episode nos.: Season 4 Episodes 7/8
- Directed by: Paul Lieberstein
- Written by: Paul Lieberstein
- Cinematography by: Randall Einhorn
- Editing by: Dean Holland
- Production code: 407/408
- Original air date: October 18, 2007
- Running time: 42 minutes

Guest appearances
- Ranjit Chowdhry as Vikram; Allan Wasserman as Nick Figaro

Episode chronology
← Previous "Launch Party"	Next → "Local Ad"
- The Office (American season 4)

"Money" is the seventh and eighth episode of the fourth season of the American comedy television series The Office and the show's sixtieth and sixty-first episode overall. It first aired on October 18, 2007, on NBC, and was the last of four consecutive hour-long episodes that opened the fourth season. The episode was written and directed by Paul Lieberstein, who also acts on the show as Human Resources Representative Toby Flenderson. "Money" marked Lieberstein's directorial debut.

In the episode, Jan, now living with Michael, forces costly changes in Michael's life and he starts to worry about his financial situation. To remedy the problem, Michael leaves work early for a late night job as a telemarketer. Meanwhile, Dwight pines over Angela, who is asked out by Andy. Pam and Jim visit Dwight's family farm, which he has fashioned into a bed and breakfast.

== Plot ==
Jim Halpert and Pam Beesly discover that Dwight Schrute is running Schrute Farm as an "agritourism" bed and breakfast. They spend the night there, taking part in table-making demonstrations, beet wine-making, distributing manure and having Dwight read an excerpt from Harry Potter and the Deathly Hallows to them. That night, Jim and Pam are awoken by Dwight moaning in depression over Angela Martin. Jim and Pam attempt to cheer him up by posting a positive review of his bed and breakfast on TripAdvisor.com. However, Andy Bernard gains Angela's approval to ask her out on a date by giving her the cat that Dwight tried to give Angela earlier. Dwight retreats to the stairwell to moan. Jim goes to console him but gets distracted with recounting his days pining for Pam, ultimately abandoning Dwight to go kiss Pam passionately. Jim and Pam are pleased when Dwight returns to his desk and starts making sales calls.

Michael Scott and Jan Levinson discuss her plans to renovate their condo. Not only are the plans costly, but Jan has forced several other changes at Michael's expense, such as trading in both cars to buy her a Porsche Boxster. Michael begins leaving the office early, refusing to explain himself to his employees and lying to Jan of his whereabouts, to combat his debt by working as a telemarketer until 1 a.m. At the office, Ryan Howard arrives to find a tired Michael who is unprepared for a presentation due to his moonlighting, and orders Michael to quit his night job or be fired from Dunder Mifflin. Kelly Kapoor flaunts the fact that she is now dating Darryl Philbin in an attempt to make Ryan jealous. Kelly and Darryl's relationship proves to be dysfunctional, as she cannot comprehend his candor, and he finds her to be attractive yet "crazy."

After quitting his telemarketing job, Michael desperately attempts to come up with money. Creed Bratton advises him to file bankruptcy, while Oscar Martinez, upon reviewing Michael's financial situation, urges him to spend less on useless items like magic kits and bass fishing equipment.

Jan learns of Michael's dismal finances by phone, and harangues Michael about being irresponsible. He panics and attempts to hop a nearby train. However, the train comes to a halt. Jan speeds to the office and then runs to the train yard. She tells him that she will stand by him as he did when she was fired. Eventually, they leave the train yard hand in hand.

== Production ==
The episode was both written and directed by Paul Lieberstein, who also plays the part of Toby Flenderson on the show. Michael yelling "I declare bankruptcy!" in the middle of the office was suggested by another writer on the show, Lee Eisenberg.

Michael was scripted to tear up a dollar bill in an effort to prove he does not have money problems, but staff for the show learned that destroying U.S. currency is illegal, so this was replaced with Michael crumbling the bill and putting it into his pocket. In the talking head scene where Creed shows a passport for one of his false identities, actor Creed Bratton used his real passport.

In the episode, Jim refers to a TripAdvisor page for Dwight's bed and breakfast. This can be found by searching for Schrute Farms. Jim and Pam ("JandP2") post a review, which can be seen on the actual reviews page. It reads: "The architecture reminds one of a quaint Tuscan beet farm, and the natural aroma of the beets drifts into the bedrooms and makes you dream of simpler times. You will never want to leave your room. The informative lecture will satisfy all your beet curiosity, and the dawn goose walk will tug at your heart strings. Table making never seemed so possible. Great story to tell your friends. Plenty of parking! The staff’s attention to detail and devotion to cleanliness was limitless. From their enthusiastic welcome to the last wave good-bye, Schrute Farms delivers."

== Reception ==
The episode was positively reviewed, although reviewers complained about the episode's length. A Buzzsugar.com review stated that "there was something off about this week's episode. It's never really a good thing when I'm checking the clock and feeling antsy at the 20-minute mark of an hour-long episode." The reviewer liked the scenes at the beet farm, especially Dwight's "mournful whale sound", but felt the story of Michael's money troubles should have been cut down. An IGN review held the reverse opinion: that the beet farm scenes, while very funny, pushed Dwight's character to the point where he was no longer believable, and that Michael's story was very good, exemplifying why Michael Scott is a much more likable character than David Brent from the original series and featuring a performance by Melora Hardin that is exceptionally compelling even by her standards. The reviewer said "while there's some really funny moments in this episode, overall I really started to feel that hour running time. Of course, as always, that doesn't make this a bad episode, just not one of their best." Additionally commenting that the episode established that Jim and Pam are just as interesting as a couple as they were when they were apart, he gave it an 8 out of 10.

"Money" received a 4.9 Nielsen Rating and a 7% share. The episode was watched by 8.50 million viewers and achieved a 4.4/11 in the adults 18–49 demographic.

For his work as director on the episode Paul Lieberstein received an Emmy nomination for Outstanding Directing for a Comedy. This made it the second fourth-season episode to receive the nomination, with the other being the season finale "Goodbye, Toby".
