= Dunder Mifflin Infinity =

- The Office episodes
- Episode nos.: Season 4 Episodes 3/4
- Directed by: Craig Zisk
- Written by: Michael Schur
- Cinematography by: Randall Einhorn
- Editing by: Dean Holland
- Production code: 403/404
- Original air date: October 4, 2007
- Running time: 42 minutes

Guest appearance
- John Ingle as Robert Dunder

Episode chronology
← Previous "Fun Run"	Next → "Launch Party"
- The Office (American season 4)

"Dunder Mifflin Infinity" is the third and fourth episode of the fourth season of the American comedy television series The Office and the show's fifty-sixth and fifty-seventh episode overall. It was written by Michael Schur, who also acts in the show, and directed by Craig Zisk. It first aired in the United States on October 4, 2007, on NBC.

In this episode, Ryan Howard (B. J. Novak) returns to his old office and reveals his plan to bring technology to Dunder Mifflin. Michael Scott (Steve Carell) and Dwight Schrute (Rainn Wilson) try to prove that the personal touch is better than technology. Meanwhile, Jim Halpert (John Krasinski) and Pam Beesly (Jenna Fischer) reveal their relationship to the rest of the office, Kelly Kapoor (Mindy Kaling) attempts to reunite with Ryan, and Dwight's and Angela Martin's (Angela Kinsey) relationship continues to plummet.

== Plot ==
Ryan Howard returns to the Scranton, Pennsylvania branch of Dunder Mifflin for the first time since his promotion to the corporate headquarters. Although he sports a more urbane look and attitude, he garners little respect from his former peers. He presents "Dunder Mifflin Infinity", his initiative to revitalize the company with new technology. Michael Scott is initially excited about the prospect of getting a BlackBerry, but is warned by Creed Bratton that the program is a ploy to get rid of older workers. Creed dyes his hair black with printer ink and employs youthful slang to convince everyone he is much younger. Michael holds a conference-room meeting on the subject of ageism. To show that personal interaction is more effective than new technology, Michael and Dwight Schrute decide to win back the clients they lost in the past year by hand-delivering gift baskets to them. Each manager they encounter refuses to return to Dunder Mifflin unless the company enables online ordering and lowers its prices. With one basket left to deliver, Michael misinterprets his rental car's GPS directions and drives into Lake Scranton. He cites this as proof that new technology is useless because it tried to kill him. After the lake incident, he and Dwight walk back to one of the former clients to awkwardly take back their gift basket, causing a scene.

Pam Beesly and Jim Halpert are exposed as a couple when Toby Flenderson circulates a memo about public displays of affection. Jim secretly informs Pam that Dwight and Angela Martin are dating, only to discover that she already knew. Meanwhile, Dwight attempts to make amends for the death of Angela's cat Sprinkles by giving her Garbage, a stray cat he found in his barn, but she rejects the gift. Kelly Kapoor tries to restart her relationship with Ryan, an effort he ignores until she tells him she is pregnant. When Ryan finds out she lied about being pregnant, he categorically refuses to get back together. Ryan asks Pam to create a logo for Dunder Mifflin Infinity. Pam is excited about the opportunity to use her art background. Ryan uses the logo as an excuse to ask her out to have dinner with him, which he does at the reception desk. Pam responds that she is dating Jim, leaving Ryan embarrassed and Jim invigorated.

== Production ==
The episode was the first episode of the series directed by Craig Zisk, who directed episodes of Nip/Tuck, Weeds, Scrubs, Smallville and The Single Guy. "Dunder Mifflin Infinity" was written by Michael Schur, who plays Dwight's Amish cousin Mose.

For Ryan's new appearance this season, the writers originally had B. J. Novak grow a goatee. Show runner and executive producer Greg Daniels decided against it, feeling that "a goatee would make Ryan a flat-out chump. And we wanted it to be more subtle." In addition to his five o'clock shadow, Ryan now wears black clothes. He explained, "We wanted him to dress as obnoxious[ly] as possible. As much black as possible." In conjunction with the episode, a "Dunder Mifflin Infinity" website was created where fans could sign up and become "employees" of different "branches", and perform tasks such as designing a logo for the company or making Creed look young again.

== Reception ==
"Dunder Mifflin Infinity" received 4.5/11 in the ages 18–49 demographic in the Nielsen ratings. This means that 4.5 percent of all households with an 18- to 49-year-old living in it watched the episode, and eleven percent had their televisions tuned to the channel at any point. The episode was watched by 8.49 million viewers.

"Dunder Mifflin Infinity" received mixed reviews from critics, with Michael driving his car into the lake being particularly panned by critics and viewers. Entertainment Weekly's Christine Fenno commented that she thought "Michael seemed a bit more focused than usual, even competent at moments. And then he drove into a lake." Jack Rodgers, from TV Guide said that his "favorite thing about this episode was the sly parallel that connects the three love stories" and "Michael’s obsession with sticking to his old methods rather than learning to change and embrace technology". Will Leitch of New York criticized the episode, saying that Michael driving into the lake felt more like the actions of a "cartoon character", than "based in reality". Leitch did say that if "we can get Michael out of that lake and back in a conference room with Ryan, we'll have something."
