= The Business School =

The Business School may refer to:

- A business school, a higher education professional school that offers programs in business administration
- "Business School" (The Office), an episode of the American comedy television series The Office
- Bayes Business School, formerly Cass Business school, renamed City's Business School and later The Business School, stylized as The Business School (formerly Cass) before taking on its current name
