= Cocktails (The Office) =

- The Office episode
- Episode no.: Season 3 Episode 18
- Directed by: J. J. Abrams
- Written by: Paul Lieberstein
- Cinematography by: Randall Einhorn
- Editing by: David Rogers
- Production code: 318
- Original air date: February 22, 2007

Guest appearances
- Creed Bratton as Creed Bratton; Rashida Jones as Karen Filippelli; Andy Buckley as David Wallace; Michael Patrick McGill as Kenny Anderson

Episode chronology
← Previous "Business School"	Next → "The Negotiation"
- The Office (American season 3)

"Cocktails" is the eighteenth episode of the third season of the American version of The Office and the show's forty-sixth episode overall. It was written by actor Paul Lieberstein and directed by Lost series creator J. J. Abrams. NBC hired Abrams and Joss Whedon to each direct an episode during their February sweeps week. Michael Patrick McGill, Dan Cole, Owen Daniels, and Jean Villepique guest starred.

In the episode, Michael, Dwight, Jim and Karen attend a cocktail party at CFO David Wallace's house. While there, Michael and Jan make their relationship public, Karen makes Jim uncomfortable by pointing out all of her alleged ex-boyfriends in attendance, and Dwight inspects the home. Meanwhile, the rest of the office goes to a bar and Pam tries to be more honest with Roy.

The first American broadcast of "Cocktails" occurred on February 22, 2007, to an estimated 8.3 million viewers. The episode was positively received by television critics, with Kevin Fitzpatrick of UGO Networks calling it one of the best of the series.

== Plot ==
Jan Levinson, Michael Scott, Dwight Schrute, Jim Halpert, and Karen Filippelli attend a cocktail party hosted by Dunder Mifflin CFO David Wallace. Jan and Michael bring along signed documents disclosing their relationship. With the branch managers away, the remainder of the office goes to happy hour at Poor Richard's Pub. Pam Beesly asks that Roy Anderson, as her boyfriend, attend as well. Roy shows up along with his brother, Kenny.

At the party, Karen plays a joke on Jim by identifying many people at the party as ex-boyfriends. Dwight takes it upon himself to give the house a thorough inspection, and spends the night critiquing the layout and materials. Towards the end of the evening, David invites Jim to play basketball in the backyard.

Michael takes relish in being able to freely proclaim his relationship with Jan to his bosses, making Jan uncomfortable. She eventually pulls him aside and tries to get him to have sex with her in the bathroom. Michael refuses and she becomes angry. As they drive home together, Jan hypothesizes that she only enjoyed being with Michael because their relationship was undisclosed and therefore unethical, and that disclosing it was a mistake. Michael is hurt and upset at this, and Jan takes back her comments to keep him from crying.

At Poor Richard's, Pam tells Roy she wants a fresh start in their relationship and tells him about her "Casino Night" kiss with Jim. Roy reacts violently and throws his glass at the bar mirror. Shocked and frightened, Pam tells Roy "this is over" and leaves as Roy and Kenny begin destroying the bar. Kenny uses the money he made from selling his jet skis to pay off the bar for damages, while Roy swears vengeance against Jim.

== Production ==
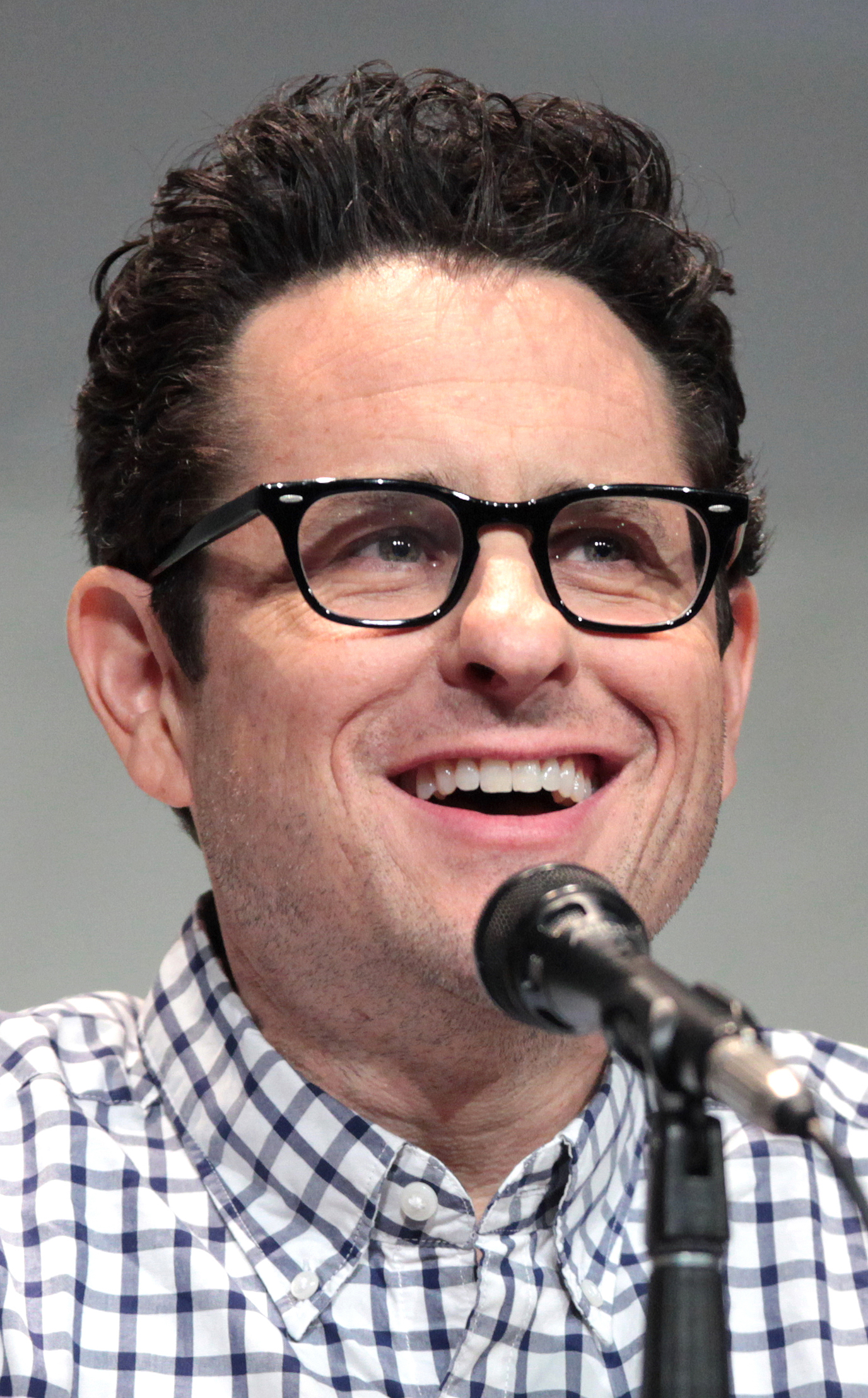
J. J. Abrams directed "Cocktails".

"Cocktails" was written by Paul Lieberstein, who plays Human Resources representative Toby Flenderson on the series. Lost series creator J. J. Abrams was hired on as episode director, his first such credit for the series. Abrams disliked the American series when it first premiered, due to his love for the original British series. The director explained, "I resented it before I saw it, because I thought, 'well, how are you going to do what Ricky and Steve did. In fact, the first season I didn't get into it at all. In the second season, they really found their voice. And that's despite having to make 22 episodes, which is twice the length of what the BBC show did. And I thought that the show became brilliant. I was really impressed by how it worked."

Abrams had been rumored as director since December 2006, and NBC confirmed this the following month. He and Buffy the Vampire Slayer creator Joss Whedon were both hired to direct an episode during February sweeps week. Abrams had known cast member Kate Flannery years before, when he used to write in a restaurant where Flannery worked as a waitress. The two were reunited on The Office set, where he stated that he was pleased with her success.

Jenna Fischer found her character's break-up scene with Roy "really dark," as she is friends with David Denman outside of the show. She explained, "To see him turn like that, for me it was even more shocking because I know him as a big teddy bear. He played it so well and I think that cliffhanger of 'I'm gonna kill Jim Halpert' is one of the best last lines of our episodes ever." "Cocktails" included recurring guest star Michael Patrick McGill as Kenny Anderson, who called working on The Office "a blast." Other guest stars included Dan Cole as Dan Gore, Owen Daniels as the Wallaces' son, and Jean Villepique as Rachel Wallace.

The season three DVD contains a number of deleted scenes. Notable cut scenes include Ryan failing to remember Stanley's daughter Melissa; Roy telling Pam to sign her Dunder Mifflin painting; extensions of the talking head interview with Jan about relationships, Dwight's upstairs house inspection, and his conversation with the CFO's son; and Michael talking over the day's events.

== Reception ==
"Cocktails" first aired in the United States on February 22, 2007. An estimated 8.3 million viewers tuned in to the episode, a drop of less than 10 percent from the previous week. Among adults aged 18–49, The Office earned a 4.2/10 ratings share, an increase of seventeen percent from its lead-in.

Television critics tended to view "Cocktails" positively. Kevin Fitzpatrick of UGO Networks praised the episode's writing and directing, explaining that "A lot of the credit goes to Paul Lieberstein for his ruthlessly funny writing, but ol' J.J. really knows how to run with the material and make awkward situations just that much more painful with his direction, one of the best episodes of the series." Buddy TV writer Oscar Dahl noted that "besides a couple of crafty camera moves, his work was mostly invisible, which is exactly what you want from a director on The Office." IGN's Brian Zoromski appreciated the spotlight on female characters Jan, Pam, and Karen, and thought there were "quite a few great little moments this episode," including "a great Creed moment as he revealed he runs a fake ID company out of his car". Entertainment Weekly columnist Abby West enjoyed Karen conning Jim at the party, called Rashida Jones' performance "brilliantly played"; West also liked Pam's newfound confidence, but believed she was "dumb" for telling Roy of her kiss with Jim.
