= Survivor Man =

- The Office episode
- Episode no.: Season 4 Episode 11
- Directed by: Paul Feig
- Written by: Steve Carell
- Cinematography by: Randall Einhorn
- Editing by: David Rogers
- Production code: 411
- Original air date: November 8, 2007

Episode chronology
← Previous "Branch Wars"	Next → "The Deposition"
- The Office (American season 4)

"Survivor Man" is the eleventh episode of the fourth season of the American comedy television series The Office and the show's sixty-fourth episode overall. Written by Steve Carell, who also acts on the show as Regional Manager of the fictional paper company Dunder Mifflin, Michael Scott, and directed by Paul Feig, it originally aired on NBC on November 8, 2007. The episode aired during NBC's week of "green episodes", which lasted from November 4 through November 10, 2007.

In the episode, Ryan excludes Michael from a company nature excursion, prompting Michael to try to prove to himself and his peers that he can survive in the wild. Dwight drops Michael off in the middle of a local wooded area and contrary to Michael's wishes, stays behind to monitor Michael. Meanwhile, Jim spends the day as boss, but his plan to incorporate multiple birthdays into one combined event ends up alienating the entire office against him.

== Plot ==
Ryan Howard invites the regional branch managers and Dunder Mifflin Scranton Human Resources representative Toby Flenderson to a corporate wilderness retreat, but does not invite Michael Scott. To show that he is capable of surviving in the wilderness, Michael leaves Jim Halpert in charge of the office and instructs Dwight Schrute to abandon him deep in the forest with merely a knife and a roll of duct tape. Contrary to Michael's wishes, Dwight stays behind and surreptitiously monitors his condition from a distance. Michael proves to be completely incapable of living out in the wild by himself, spending most of the day filming himself cutting off his pants to use as a bandana, then a tent, and then ducttaping them back into pants. Dwight comes out of hiding to save Michael when he tries to eat wild mushrooms.

Jim's plan to consolidate three employee birthdays into a combined birthday party encounters several complications, and his constant adjustments incur the ire of Party Planning Committee chair Angela Martin. Jim discovers that no one likes his idea for a combined party, realizing the depth of his error when Phyllis Vance mistakenly refers to him as Michael, and he returns to the original plan of having separate parties. Michael and Dwight return, lightening the mood amongst the employees. During the lighting of Creed Bratton's birthday cobbler, Michael expresses that he no longer has any desire to return to the wilderness and Jim expresses his relief that Michael has returned to run the office. Michael tells Jim that he attempted the combined birthday parties as well to disastrous results, and that Jim will figure things out after ten years. When Jim tells Michael that he does not believe he will still be at Dunder Mifflin after ten years, Michael tells Jim he thought the same way ten years ago.

== Production ==
"Survivor Man" is the second episode written by Steve Carell. He also wrote the second season finale "Casino Night". The episode is the fifth episode directed by Paul Feig, and his first since the second-season episode "E-mail Surveillance". "Survivor Man" is the second episode to feature birthdays as a plot line. The episode was the penultimate episode to be aired before the 2007–2008 Writers Guild of America strike halted production.

The episode's title and plot share similarities with Survivorman, a television show in which the host is placed in the wilderness with little or no supplies for survival. The producers contacted Survivorman host Les Stroud to obtain permission to parody his work. Stroud revealed in a 2020 interview with GQ that he "couldn't have been more honoured" at the idea of the episode, and went on to state that he considered this episode to be the "highlight of his career".

== Reception ==
"Survivor Man" received a 4.9/7 in the Nielsen ratings, meaning that 4.9 percent of households were tuned in at any given moment and seven percent of all televisions in use were tuned in to the program. The episode was watched by 8.29 million viewers and achieved a 4.3/10 in the ages 18–49 demographic. Travis Fickett of IGN stated that "Overall, this isn't a terrific episode, but holds up the show's usual standard. Steve Carell is hilarious as usual. Watching him attempt to make shelter and clothing out of his suit over the span of only a few hours is great fun." Fickett also stated that a good portion of the humor in the episode came from in-jokes that required previous knowledge of the series, specifically pointing out the parallel comparison between Michael and Jim's lives. Like Fickett, Christine Fenno of Entertainment Weekly praised the episode's comparison between Michael and Jim. Fenno also went on to praise other points of the episode, stating she also enjoyed the overall episode for its "just outdoorsiness with Michael and Dwight, and infighting among the rest of the staff." Oscar Dahl, a Senior Writer for BuddyTV, stated that "What seems like a one and done episode without much character work at first turns into much more by the end." Dahl went on to praise the episode, stating that it was "lighter" in comparison to Carell's previous episode "Casino Night".
