= Branch Wars =

- The Office episode
- Episode no.: Season 4 Episode 10
- Directed by: Joss Whedon
- Written by: Mindy Kaling
- Cinematography by: Randall Einhorn
- Editing by: Dean Holland
- Production code: 410
- Original air date: November 1, 2007

Guest appearance
- Rashida Jones as Karen Filippelli

Episode chronology
← Previous "Local Ad"	Next → "Survivor Man"
- The Office (American season 4)

"Branch Wars" is the tenth episode of the fourth season of the American comedy television series The Office and the show's sixty-third episode overall. Written by Mindy Kaling and directed by Joss Whedon, the episode originally aired in the United States on November 1, 2007, on NBC. The episode marks the return of season three recurring actor Rashida Jones, who plays Jim's former girlfriend Karen Filippelli, now Regional Manager of Dunder Mifflin Utica.

Karen tries to "poach" Stanley Hudson (Leslie David Baker) from Dunder Mifflin Scranton, and Stanley informs the branch that he is leaving. In revenge, Michael Scott (Steve Carell), Dwight Schrute (Rainn Wilson), and Jim Halpert (John Krasinski) travel to the company's Utica branch to play a prank on Karen. At the Scranton branch, Pam Beesly (Jenna Fischer), Oscar Martinez (Oscar Nunez), and Toby Flenderson (Paul Lieberstein) hold a literary club meeting.

== Plot ==
Karen Filippelli, after being "dumped" by Jim Halpert, has become the Regional Manager at Dunder Mifflin's Utica, New York branch. Karen attempts to lure Stanley Hudson away from Scranton by offering him a pay raise. Scranton Regional Manager Michael Scott, believing that Karen is doing this to get back at Jim for dumping her, decides to retaliate. Jim objects to the enterprise, but after learning that Michael and salesman Dwight Schrute have loaded their car with homemade bombs for a trip to Utica and have no concrete plan for what they will do when they arrive, tags along with the intent of keeping the prank from going too far. After a failed attempt to steal the branch's industrial copier, the group is discovered by Karen, who chastises them in her office. Unaware that Jim is dating Pam, she assumes Jim masterminded the scheme as an excuse to see her, and makes an overture towards reconciliation. When Jim informs her of the situation with him and Pam, Karen becomes bitter and snarky, and Jim awkwardly excuses himself. The group returns to Scranton, where Michael bids Stanley farewell. Stanley announces he has decided to stay in Scranton, but privately tells the documentary crew that he never intended to leave in the first place, and was merely negotiating for a raise.

Meanwhile, Pam Beesly, Oscar Martinez, and Toby Flenderson form a "Finer Things Club", discussing literature, music, and the arts. Their meetings are regularly disrupted by other employees, particularly Andy Bernard, whose desperate efforts to join prove unsuccessful. Pam invites Jim to join the club but regrets the move when, during the discussion of Angela's Ashes, Jim merely speaks in an Irish brogue and is unable to prove he actually read the book.

== Production ==
"Branch Wars" was the second Office episode directed by Joss Whedon, the creator of the television series Buffy the Vampire Slayer and Firefly. Whedon had previously directed the third season episode "Business School". The episode was the seventh Office episode written by Mindy Kaling, who also acts for the show as customer service representative Kelly Kapoor. "Branch Wars" marked the return of Karen Filippelli, who was a regular as a member of the Dunder Mifflin Stamford branch, and later Dunder Mifflin Scranton in the third season. Her last previous appearance was the fourth season premiere "Fun Run", although she only appeared in one scene. Utica salesman Ben Nugent, although not appearing on screen, is heard via a telephone conference and shares the same name as Kaling's former real-life boyfriend, Benjamin Nugent.

== Reception ==
"Branch Wars" received a 5.0/7 in the Nielsen ratings, meaning that five percent of households were tuned in at any given moment and seven percent of all televisions in use at the time were tuned into the program. The episode was watched by 8.39 million viewers and achieved a 4.5/11 in the ages 18–49 demographic. Mindy Kaling's writing in the episode was nominated for "Outstanding Writing in a Comedy Series" in the 2008 NAACP Image Awards.

Oscar Dahl, a senior writer for BuddyTV, gave the episode a favorable review and stated that "Tonight's Office was possibly the funniest of the season." Christine Fenno of Entertainment Weekly stated that "... 'Branch Wars', penned by Mindy Kaling, didn't measure up to the brilliance of last week's episode ('Local Ad') but served up plenty of laughs." Travis Fickett of IGN stated that "This episode feels like it comes in two halves, one that works and one that doesn't so much" when referring to the trip to Utica, and "The Finer Things Club", respectively, but later pointed out that "Despite being a somewhat bumpy ride, the episode has a fair number of big laughs." Fickett particularly enjoyed Jim's character in the episode, and his actions and reactions to the situation that he became involved in.
