= The Convict =

- The Office episode
- Michael Scott portraying Prison Mike
- Episode no.: Season 3 Episode 9
- Directed by: Jeffrey Blitz
- Written by: Ricky Gervais; Stephen Merchant
- Cinematography by: Randall Einhorn
- Editing by: David Rogers
- Production code: 310
- Original air date: November 30, 2006
- Running time: 21:11

Guest appearances
- Creed Bratton as Creed Bratton; Ed Helms as Andy Bernard; Rashida Jones as Karen Filippelli; Wayne Wilderson as Martin Nash

Episode chronology
← Previous "The Merger"	Next → "A Benihana Christmas"
- The Office (American season 3)

"The Convict" is the ninth episode of the third season of the American comedy television series The Office and the show's 37th overall. It first aired on November 30, 2006 in the United States on NBC. The episode was the series' only original script written by Ricky Gervais and Stephen Merchant, who are the creators of the original British comedy series of the same name. It was directed by Jeffrey Blitz, his first such credit of the series.

The series depicts the everyday lives of office employees in the Scranton and Stamford branches of the fictional Dunder Mifflin Paper Company. In this episode, Michael Scott (Steve Carell) discovers that an employee named Martin Nash (Wayne Wilderson), who came with the branches' recent merger, was previously in prison. Michael becomes frustrated when Martin's stories of prison sound better than working in the office. Meanwhile, Jim Halpert (John Krasinski) plays a prank on Pam Beesly (Jenna Fischer) by giving incorrect information to Andy Bernard (Ed Helms) on how to impress her.

According to Nielsen Media Research, an estimated 9.07 million viewers watched "The Convict" on its first broadcast, making it up to that point the largest audience of the season. Among adults aged 18 to 49, it earned a 4.4/11 ratings share, finishing in eighteenth place for the week among all the major networks. Television critics were largely positive towards the episode, particularly Carell's "Prison Mike" sequence as well as Helms' performance as Andy Bernard.

== Synopsis ==
Michael Scott learns that black employee Martin Nash is a former criminal, and tells the entire office. His clumsy attempts to stand up for Martin backfire, and Martin begins to face discrimination from others, particularly Angela and Dwight. Meanwhile, Jim Halpert encourages Andy Bernard to pursue Pam Beesly, and intentionally gives him information about her strong dislikes. Later, Andy strums "Rainbow Connection" on his banjo while singing falsetto. Pam smiles politely and silently shares the joke with Jim.

Martin tells the others he was incarcerated for insider trading, and that he enjoyed certain perks of prison, including outside time and art classes. Pam comments that prison sounds better than their current work situation. Attempting to convince his employees that the office is better than prison, Michael sends everyone to "outside time" in the bitter cold, then calls a meeting in which he adopts the persona of "Prison Mike", who attempts to persuade the workers to know why prison is much worse than they think. Martin comments that Michael's performance did not remind him of his time in prison. This further infuriates Michael, who then locks all of the staff inside the conference room. In order to have his co-workers released, Toby Flenderson tells Michael the staff is simply teasing him. Michael lets his annoyed employees go, and Martin chooses to quit, which Michael explains to the camera crew is a relief because Martin had become a "nuisance".

== Production ==
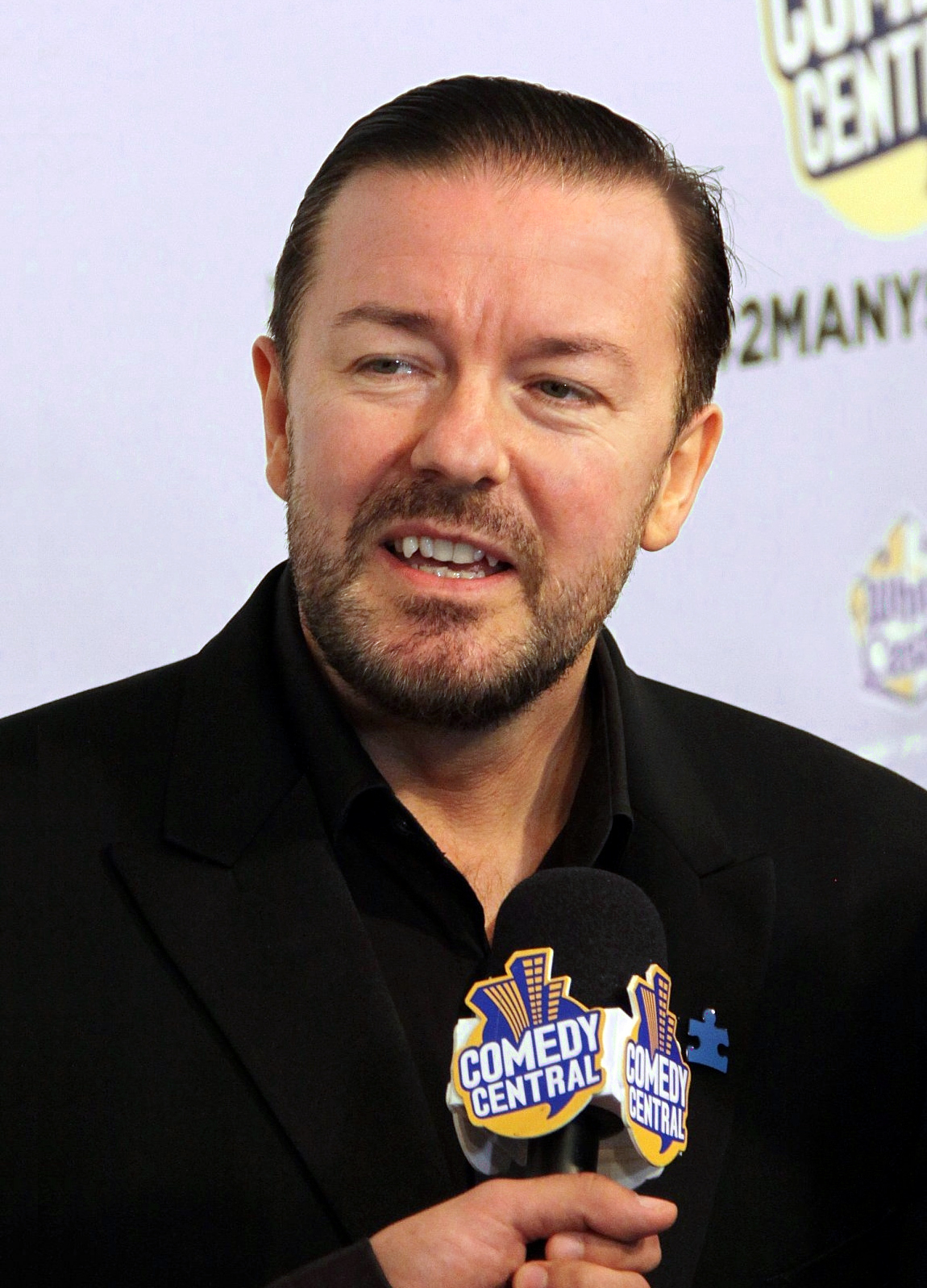
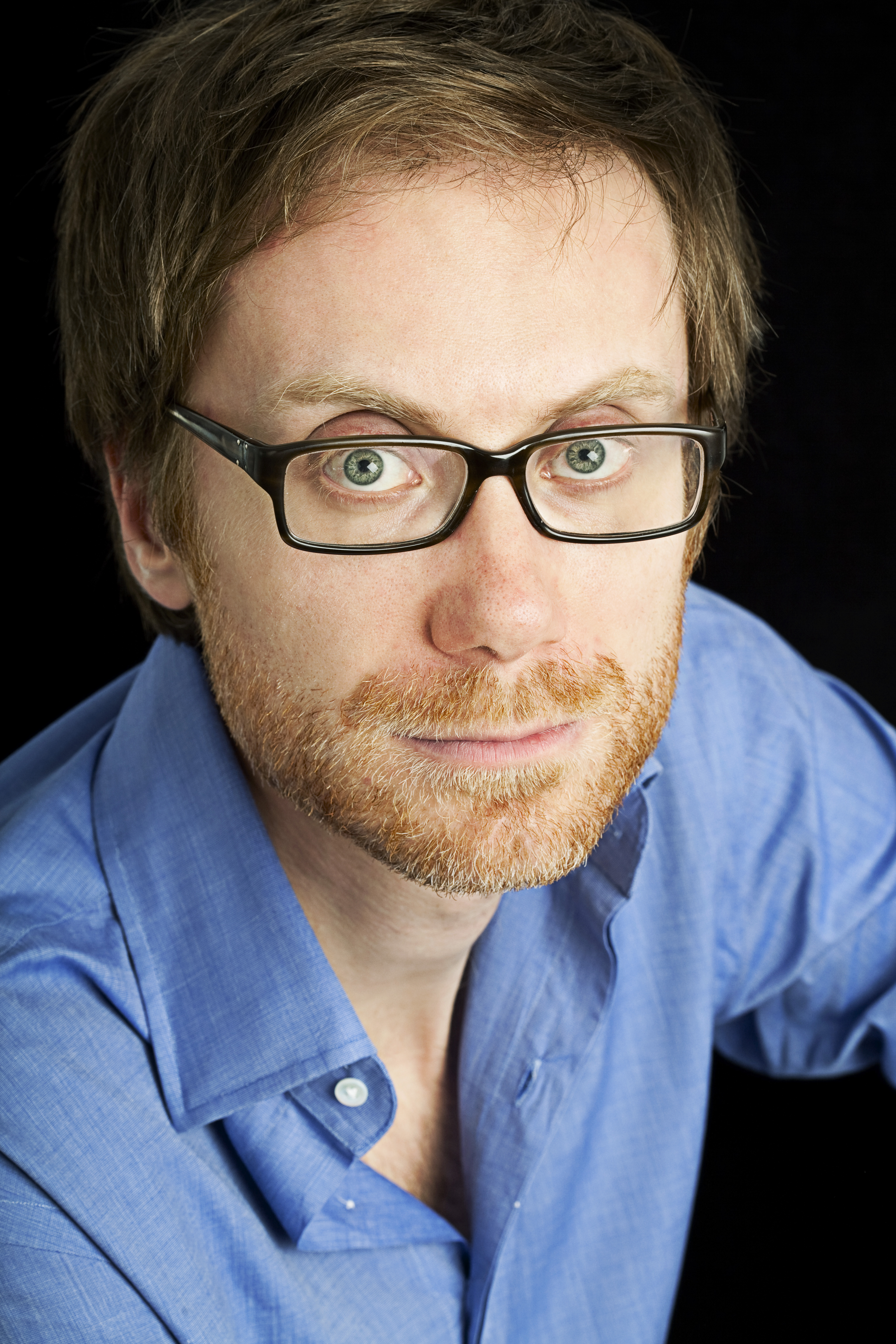
Ricky Gervais and Stephen Merchant, the creators of the British series, wrote "The Convict"

"The Convict" was written by Ricky Gervais and Stephen Merchant, the creators of the British comedy series of the same name. It was their first and only original script for the American series, after years of creator and executive producer Greg Daniels imploring them to participate. Gervais and Merchant had refused previously because they believed that the American show should be written by Americans, and only changed their minds after watching the second season.

Gervais first worried that he was too unfamiliar with office protocol in the United States, noting that he "knew everything about this place (in England), the pitfalls, the dos and don'ts. Whereas in America, I don't know if I'm getting it right or not." Despite this, his script writing went "remarkably fast. I suppose that's because we'd been away from those characters for two or three years. It's one of our favorite shows, the American Office." Gervais and Merchant spent several days debating phrasing and language, leading them to a point where they felt they had "translated it pretty well" for American viewers.

"The Convict" was the first Office episode to be directed by Jeffrey Blitz, who later won the Primetime Emmy Award for Outstanding Directing for a Comedy Series for the fifth season episode "Stress Relief" in 2009. In a departure from series routine, Gervais and Merchant were not present on set for much of filming, though episode writers had typically been available in the past. Actress Kate Flannery found the episode "a lot of fun to shoot," and observed that on the occasions Gervais was present, "it seems to me like he is looking at all of us with a sense of, 'I can't believe that this exists because of me.' That is just my interpretation, but he seems so humble, and kind of reverent." One scene was meant to take place outdoors under cold temperatures, so the parking lot set was laden with fake snow and slush. Also present on set were two sets of twin babies, as the character of Hannah Smotridge-Barr brings her son to the office.

The third season DVD contains several scenes that were deleted from the final cut of the episode. These include Dwight and Andy verbally sparring in the kitchen, Dwight informing Michael that he believes Martin has murdered Meredith, Michael explaining that he created "Prison Mike" in an improvisation class, and Pam giving Andy wildly incorrect tips for hanging out with Jim.

== Reception ==
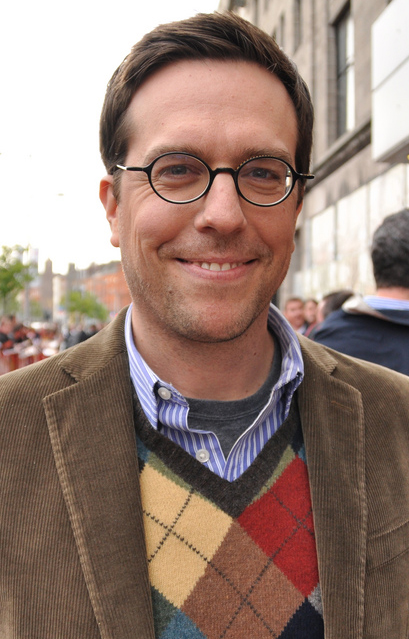
Ed Helms was singled out for praise by television critics.

"The Convict" was first broadcast on NBC in the United States on November 30, 2006, near the end of the fall sweeps period. According to Nielsen Media Research, it was watched by an estimated 9.07 million viewers, the highest number of the series' season up to that point. The episode earned a 4.4/11 ratings share among adults aged 18 to 49, meaning that it was seen by 4.4 percent of all 18- to 49-year-olds, and 11 percent of all 18- to 49-year-olds watching television at the time of broadcast. Among that demographic, The Office finished in eighteenth place for the week among all of the major networks.

Eric Goldman of IGN rated "The Convict" 9 out of 10, an indication of an "amazing" episode. He wrote that "while this wouldn't qualify as one of the very best episodes of the series, the great news is, Gervais and Merchant did an excellent job, working very well within the same-but-different world the US version of the show has created, and delivering some of the biggest and best laughs of the season." Mark A. Perigard of the Boston Herald however was more critical of the episode, explaining that "Carell is a fearless actor, but he can't stop a train wreck. The B-story is better, as Jim decides to prank Pam by coaching Andy on just the wrong way to woo the receptionist. The Office has been erratic all season, but even at its worst, it's still the best comedy on television."

Writing for AOL TV, Michael Sciannamea thought "The Convict" seemed different from previous episodes, citing as evidence the scene of Michael and Martin discussing trustworthy black men; Sciannamea attributed this to its guest writers: "I don't think Gervais and Merchant went over the top...it just seemed a little different than the others." Also in his review, Sciannamea expressed his gradual enjoyment of Andy, "When I first saw him up in Stamford, I thought he was just the Connecticut version of Dwight. But now I think he adds greatly to the mix and is definitely one who is going to stir things up in Scranton." Give Me My Remote's Kath Skerry believed "the uncomfortable, unbearably awkward moments that the UK version perfected are definitely present throughout the episode." She also praised Helms for "prov[ing] once again how perfectly he fits in on this show as he is absolutely hysterical."

Entertainment Weekly columnist Abby West was pleased with the Jim-Karen storyline and called it "a nice, normal progression for two single people who are into each other." She also praised Jim's prank on Pam, especially viewing Helms' performance "amazingly funny as this oblivious blowhard." Referring to "Michael's earnest determination not to assume that Martin was the ex-con whom the Stamford office had hired," West found the episode to be a satire of "white liberal guilt". Reviewers were also positive towards the "Prison Mike" sequence, with West calling it "a dead-on impersonation of a badass convict." Television Without Pity gave the episode an "A−".
