= Business School (The Office) =

- The Office episode
- Episode no.: Season 3 Episode 17
- Directed by: Joss Whedon
- Written by: Brent Forrester
- Cinematography by: Randall Einhorn
- Editing by: Dean Holland
- Production code: 317
- Original air date: February 15, 2007

Guest appearances
- Creed Bratton as Creed Bratton; Rashida Jones as Karen Filippelli; Michael Patrick McGill as Kenny Anderson

Episode chronology
← Previous "Phyllis' Wedding"	Next → "Cocktails"
- The Office (American season 3)

"Business School" is the seventeenth episode of the third season of the American version of The Office and the show's 45th overall. In the episode, Michael Scott (Steve Carell) is invited by Ryan Howard (B. J. Novak) to speak to his business school class. When many of the students question the usefulness of paper in a computerized world, Michael attempts to inform the class of how essential paper is. Meanwhile, a bat becomes trapped in the office, leading Dwight Schrute (Rainn Wilson) on a mission to protect the employees.

The episode was written by Brent Forrester and directed by Joss Whedon. Whedon became involved with the show due to being a friend of series creator Greg Daniels as well as series co-star Jenna Fischer. Despite Whedon's experience with Buffy the Vampire Slayer, the subplot about Dwight coming to believe that Jim Halpert is a vampire was entirely coincidental.

The episode aired on NBC on February 15, 2007, and was seen by an estimated 8.84 million viewers according to Nielsen Media Research. It was positively received by television critics, with several writing positively of Joss Whedon's involvement. Carell's performance was also positively received, and several critics applauded the scene in which Michael praises Pam's art.

== Plot ==
Ryan Howard invites Michael Scott to speak at his business-school class. Michael is excited, but Ryan admits in a talking head interview that he has only invited Michael because his professor promised to bump up the grade of any student who brings their boss into class. During his introduction of Michael, Ryan predicts that Dunder Mifflin will become obsolete within five to ten years. However, Michael could not hear him and proceeds to ruin the event with his antics, including tearing pages out of a student's textbook to prove you "can't learn from textbooks" and only managing non-sensical answers to business-related questions from Ryan's classmates. When one student asks for Michael's opinion of Ryan's prediction, Michael is infuriated and hurt and proceeds to rant about how Ryan has never made a sale, then storms out. When Michael and Ryan return to the office, Michael punishes Ryan by relocating his desk to the "annex" where Kelly Kapoor works. Although Ryan insists it's only temporary, Kelly quickly becomes obsessed.

Meanwhile, Dwight Schrute discovers a bat in the ceiling. It flies through the office, sending the employees scurrying. Jim Halpert and Karen Filippelli exploit Dwight's paranoia, and pretend that Jim was bitten by the bat and is turning into a vampire. Jim calls animal control, but Dwight insists on catching the bat himself even after 5 p.m. passes and the other employees go home, except Meredith, who continues to hide in the breakroom for fear of the bat. Dwight catches the bat with a garbage bag after it lands on Meredith's head.

Pam Beesly invites her co-workers to her art show after work. At the show, Oscar Martinez and his partner Gil critique her art, with Gil dismissing it as "motel art," not realizing that she is standing right behind them. None of her other co-workers show up, leaving her feeling rejected and sad. Roy comes by and compliments her work, but obviously just as a boyfriend's gesture with no sincere appreciation. The general attendees show little interest in her drawings, and she begins to doubt her abilities. As she begins to take her work down, Michael arrives, having been delayed by the trip back to the office to move Ryan's things. He expresses sincere awe for her work and asks to buy her drawing of the office building, saying that he is very proud of her. Pam embraces him as her eyes tear up. Michael hangs Pam's drawing on the wall next to his office.

== Production ==
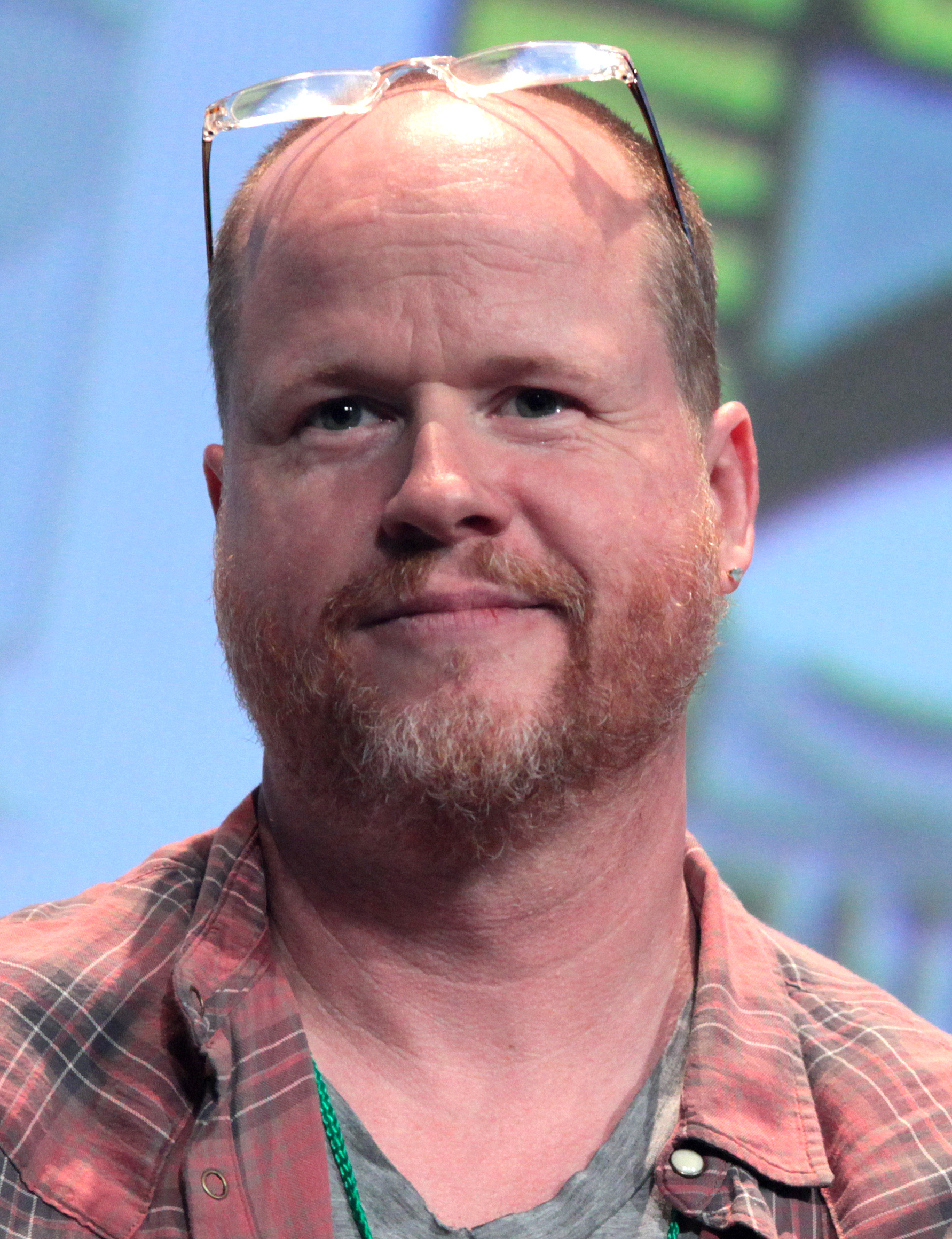
"Business School" was directed by Joss Whedon.

"Business School" was the second Office episode written by Brent Forrester. However, Forrester did not come up with either the business school plot or the bat plot; he was handed these ideas on two 3-by-5 index cards and told to write an episode around them. Forrester had previously written "The Merger." The episode was the first of two to be directed by Joss Whedon. Whedon, who is a friend of both producer Greg Daniels and Jenna Fischer, and also met most of the production staff prior to the episode, stated that he chose to direct the episode "because I already know the writing staff and a bunch of the cast, and I adore the show." When informed that the episode was about a bat entering into the office and one of the characters pretending to be a vampire, Whedon thought that it was a joke; in reference to Buffy the Vampire Slayer, he quipped to the crew, "Didn't I just leave this party?" In an interview featured on the third season DVD, Whedon joked that the "Business School" episode and his former TV show were very similar because "Buffy…was sad and depressing but…it was funny. Especially when people died. And a lot of people do die in ['Business School']." But upon completing the episode, Whedon said, "That was just coincidence. But that's how that happened. God, it was fun." Whedon stated that he was surprised with the amount of input he was allowed with the script. "I wouldn't say freedom to do things with it… But way more input was asked for than I would have ever anticipated."

At Pam's art show, the pieces which she was supposed to have painted did not suit Whedon; he explained, "I got to the set and saw Pam's art, and I was like, 'This is not right.'" This prompted an on-set argument between Whedon and Daniels. Whedon said that he held up filming for more than an hour until the staff was able create new pieces of art.

A talking head scene was scripted to have Dwight say that he once shot a werewolf, but by the time he reached the body, "it had turned back into my neighbor.", which Forrester admitted would most likely have been cut had it been filmed as scripted. Dwight actor Rainn Wilson instead ad-libbed "it had turned back into my neighbor's dog." The production staff thought this version made Dwight's story much more plausible and therefore funnier.

For the scenes which involved filming with a bat, the production team used an actual bat, an animated bat, and a mechanical bat. When around the actual bat, Kate Flannery, who portrays Meredith Palmer, stated that "we had to be extremely quiet around [it], basically pretending to scream." The bat suffered a minor injury during the production, falling from the ceiling and landing on the carpet.

California State University, Northridge served as the backdrop for Ryan's business school and the art show; the scenes at the institution were shot in January 2007. Northridge students and teachers served as the extras for these scenes. Michael's candy bar routine was a last-minute addition to the script by Jennifer Celotta.

== Reception ==
"Business School" first aired on February 15, 2007, in the United States on NBC. According to Nielsen Media Research, the episode was watched by an estimated 8.84 million viewers. The Office garnered a 4.4/11 rating in the 18- to 49-year-old demographic. This means that it was seen by 4.4 percent of all 18- to 49-year-olds, and 11 percent of all 18- to 49-year-olds watching television at the time of the broadcast.

The episode received generally good reviews from critics. Brian Zoromski of IGN stated that "'Business School' was an exercise in what works best in an Office episode." Zoromski also praised Joss Whedon's directorial debut for the show, stating that "Whedon's direction and sense of humor was both excellently put to use and alluded to in the scenes in which Jim hilariously pretended to become a vampire." Zoromski went on to say that the acting of John Krasinski and Rashida Jones, who portrays Karen Filippelli, helped to make the vampire scenes the funniest parts of the episode. He gave the episode a 9.1 out of 10. Abby West of Entertainment Weekly stated that "This show has always been able to turn on a dime and take the comedy to a soul-stirring dramatic climax with just the lightest of touches, and last night was no different." West went on to praise Michael and Pam's scene at the art show as one of these moments.

In a retrospective review of the show's third season, Erik Adams of The A.V. Club awarded the episode an "A". Adams highlighted Carell's acting, writing, "On this rewatch, I found myself slack-jawed at how deep Carell gets into Michael's 'saying something without saying anything' style." Adams also applauded the way that Carell's character brings honesty to the final scene in which Michael praises Pam's art and offers to buy it for the office, writing, "The boss should keep his mouth shut more often, but every once in a while, that constant stream of bad jokes, misattributed information, and banalities produces a warm and uplifting sentiment." Finally, Adams compared "Business School" with previous television episodes that Joss Whedon has written, noting that the characters' "triumphs over naysayers and foreboding villains" (e.g., Pam receiving harsh criticism about her art only to be vindicated in the end, Michael being humiliated in Ryan's business class but ultimately affirming his strength as an effective salesman) was akin to how Whedon often wrote his heroes triumphing over seasonal "Big Bads".
