= The Merger (The Office) =

- The Office episode
- Episode no.: Season 3 Episode 8
- Directed by: Ken Whittingham
- Written by: Brent Forrester
- Cinematography by: Randall Einhorn
- Editing by: David Rogers
- Production code: 308
- Original air date: November 16, 2006
- Running time: 30 minutes

Guest appearances
- Creed Bratton as Creed Bratton; Ed Helms as Andy Bernard; Rashida Jones as Karen Filippelli; Wayne Wilderson as Martin Nash

Episode chronology
← Previous "Branch Closing"	Next → "The Convict"
- The Office (American season 3)

"The Merger" is the eighth episode of the third season of the American comedy television series The Office and the show's 36th overall. It was written by consulting producer Brent Forrester and directed by Ken Whittingham. It first aired on November 16, 2006, as a special "super-sized" 40-minute (including commercials) episode on NBC.

The series depicts the everyday lives of office employees in the Scranton and Stamford branches of the fictional Dunder Mifflin Paper Company. In this episode, the two branches are merged. Jim Halpert (John Krasinski) and Pam Beesly (Jenna Fischer) have an awkward reunion, Michael Scott (Steve Carell) tries to make his new employees feel welcome, and a rivalry begins between Dwight Schrute (Rainn Wilson) and Andy Bernard (Ed Helms).

The episode featured recurring guest stars Helms, Creed Bratton, Rashida Jones, Wayne Wilderson, Mike Bruner, and Ursula Burton. According to Nielsen Media Research, an estimated 8.63 million viewers watched "The Merger" on its first broadcast. Critical reception to the episode was mainly positive, with many reviewers spotlighting Helms and his character in particular as highlights.

== Synopsis ==
The Scranton and Stamford branches prepare for the upcoming merger. Pam Beesly professes excitement over the merger, mostly because of the return of Jim Halpert. Jim has become slightly distant to her, and has formed a close relationship with Karen Filippelli. Feeling bad with their awkward reunion, Jim catches up to Pam at the end of the day and informs her that he is seeing someone. Pam assures him that they are still friends.

Andy Bernard proclaims he will be the No. 2 man in Scranton in six weeks time through "name repetition, personality mirroring, and never breaking off a handshake." A rivalry between Dwight Schrute and Andy begins over the No. 2 position in the office. At the welcoming party, Michael Scott plays a comedic rapping videotape he has created called "Lazy Scranton".

The merger is fraught with personal conflicts as the Scranton employees are unwilling to adjust to the newcomers. In a plan to unite the employees, Michael unintentionally embarrasses obese new employee Tony Gardner by attempting to push him onto a table with the rest of the new employees; this causes Tony to quit. However, an angered Michael fires him instead, unintentionally entitling him to severance pay. When Michael announces that Jim is the No. 2 in the office, Dwight and Andy argue over who is No. 3. Hoping to unite the Scranton and Stamford employees by creating a common enemy for them, Michael deflates the tires in everyone's cars and plants a note assigning responsibility to their neighbors Vance Refrigeration. The transparency of this tactic (the employees notice that Michael's tires alone are undamaged) leads the Scranton and Stamford employees to find that they have a common interest: their contempt of Michael. They begin fraternizing with each other at last, to Michael's satisfaction.

== Production ==
"The Merger" was the fourth episode of the series to be directed by Ken Whittingham. It was written by consulting producer Brent Forrester, his first writing credit for The Office. The episode featured guest appearances from recurring actor Creed Bratton as well as from Ed Helms, Rashida Jones, Wayne Wilderson, Mike Bruner, and Ursula Burton, whose characters joined the Scranton branch. In her weekly blog for TV Guide, actress Kate Flannery stated that it "was a really fun episode" to film, as she was able to work with a variety of new actors. She added, "They double the size and they double the comedy... It was like a party all week shooting this episode."

The season three DVD contains a number of deleted scenes, including Kevin and Angela reacting to Jim's return, Karen noting that she and Meredith have the same thermos and being offered alcohol, Andy introducing himself to Kevin, Michael telling Karen and Phyllis that eventually they will "share the same menstrual cycle," Hannah and Meredith fighting over desk space, Andy asking Kevin if he has lost weight, and Michael performing a magic trick in front of the office. The original broadcast contained a small subplot involving Kevin and a new paper shredder from Staples Inc., where Kevin talks about how he is given almost no responsibility at work but is content as long as they let him shred documents. It was removed from the episode for the DVD release and is not contained in the deleted scenes. It is included on the Amazon Prime Video version of the episode.

== Reception ==
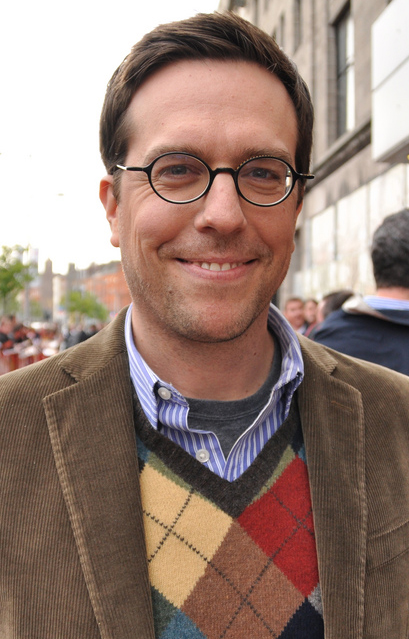
Ed Helms received positive reception for his portrayal of Andy Bernard.

"The Merger" was first broadcast on November 16, 2006 in the United States on the National Broadcasting Company (NBC). As a special promotion, the network broadcast "super-sized", forty-minute episodes of The Office, 30 Rock, and My Name Is Earl. According to Nielsen Media Research, an estimated 8.63 million viewers watched the episode. Among adults aged 18 to 49, it earned 4.2/10 ratings share, meaning that it was seen by 4.2 percent of all 18- to 49-year-olds, and 10 percent of all 18- to 49-year-olds watching television at the time of broadcast. The episode reached second place for the night in that demographic, and twenty-fourth for the week among all the major networks.

IGN's Brian Zoromski rated "The Merger" 9 out of 10, an indication of an "amazing" episode. He called the opening sequence "arguably the funniest" scene, and believed "Andy's proven to be an even better source of hilarity than he ever was in the Stamford office." Zoromski was unhappy however with the "outright product placement" with Staples, writing that "the show's quality felt a little compromised. It's one thing to see blatant product placement in a reality show like Survivor or American Idol but when it invades a great scripted comedy… well, it kinda drags the show down to the reality level." Doug Elfman of the Chicago Sun-Times thought the episode was "funnier than it's been in a while," praising Kelly but criticizing the "fat-guy joke." Elfman cited Michael and Andy's new relationship as a positive element. Television Without Pity graded the episode with an A+.

Entertainment Weekly columnist Abby West praised Fischer's "masterful" performance, writing that it "really is nice to see Pam coming into her own... And I love that she didn't inhibit herself when Jim walked in – she just ran right up and hugged him." West also highlighted Carell and Helms, explaining that with the former, "Michael is never completely loathsome – because Steve Carell imbues him with such vulnerability." AOL TV writer Michael Sciannamea also enjoyed Helms' performance, believing that "the competition between Andy and Dwight will surely make for some classic moments." Sciannamea concluded his review, "What makes this show so great is that the supporting players have a chance to shine at the right moments. I thought Stanley's reactions to the whole situation were hysterical, and Creed is just great. He deserves some more airtime."
