= Dunder Mifflin =

Paper company from American TV series "The Office"

Dunder Mifflin Paper Company, Inc.
- The Office; The Paper organization
- Dunder Mifflin Paper Company, Inc. logo

In-universe information
- Type: Public (seasons 1–6); Private (seasons 6–9)
- Founder: Robert Dunder; Robert Mifflin
- Founded: 1949
- Fate: Purchased by Enervate in 2019
- Location: Headquarters: New York City; Regional branches: Akron; Albany [closed] Binghamton [closed] Buffalo [closed] Camden [closed] Nashua; Pittsfield [closed] Rochester; Scranton (location of show); Stamford [closed] Syracuse; Utica; Yonkers [closed]
- Owner: Publicly traded on NYSE (seasons 1–6); Sabre (seasons 6–8); David Wallace (season 9) Enervate (The Paper)
- Key people: Robert Dunder (co-founder); Robert Mifflin (co-founder); Alan Brand (CEO); David Wallace (CFO / Chairman & CEO / owner)
- Employees: List
- Products: Paper; Office supplies
- Slogan: Limitless Paper in a Paperless World OR "The People Person's Paper People"
- Competitors: Staples Inc. Office Depot; Prince Family Paper (closed); Michael Scott Paper Company (bought); Big Red Paper Company; Osprey Paper

Dunder Mifflin Paper Company, Inc. (DMI) is a fictional paper and office supplies wholesale company featured in the American television series The Office, based in Scranton, Pennsylvania. It is analogous to Wernham Hogg in the British original of the series, and Papiers Jennings and Cogirep in the French Canadian and French adaptations, respectively. Originally, the company was completely fictitious, but eventually, the brand was used to sell products at Staples and other office supply outlets.

Two websites were created to support the fictional company, one with the image of a public website, and one meant to look like the corporation's intranet. NBC sold branded merchandise at its NBC Universal Store website. Its logo was prominently displayed in several locations in downtown Scranton, Pennsylvania, where the show is set. Scranton has been associated internationally with Dunder Mifflin due to the show's international reach.

In the first episode of The Paper, which is written by The Office creators Greg Daniels and Korman, they explain that the fictional Dunder Mifflin company was ultimately purchased by Enervate, which sells paper products like janitorial paper, toilet paper, toilet protectors and local newspapers. The name is also at the center of a trademark infringement lawsuit filed by NBCUniversal against Jay Kennette Media Group; when NBC tried to obtain a trademark for the name in 2020, they were denied because Jay Kennette had already registered the trademark in 2017, and was selling merchandise well before NBC.

== Overview ==
A fourth-season episode, "Dunder Mifflin Infinity", said the company was founded in 1949 by Robert Dunder (John Ingle) and Robert Mifflin, initially to sell brackets for use in construction. The fifth-season episode "Company Picnic" said that the co-founders met on a tour of Dartmouth College. U.S. News & World Report likened it to many actual companies in its size range: "It is facing an increasingly competitive marketplace. Like many smaller players, it just can't compete with the low prices charged by big-box rivals like Staples, OfficeMax and Office Depot, and it seems to be constantly bleeding corporate customers that are focused on cutting costs themselves." The show's creators shared this assessment—co-producer Kent Zbornak said, "It's basically a Staples, just not as big"—as did some of those companies. Chuck Rubin, an Office Depot executive, said, "Since Dunder Mifflin could be considered among our competitors ... I think Michael Scott is actually the perfect person to run their Scranton office."

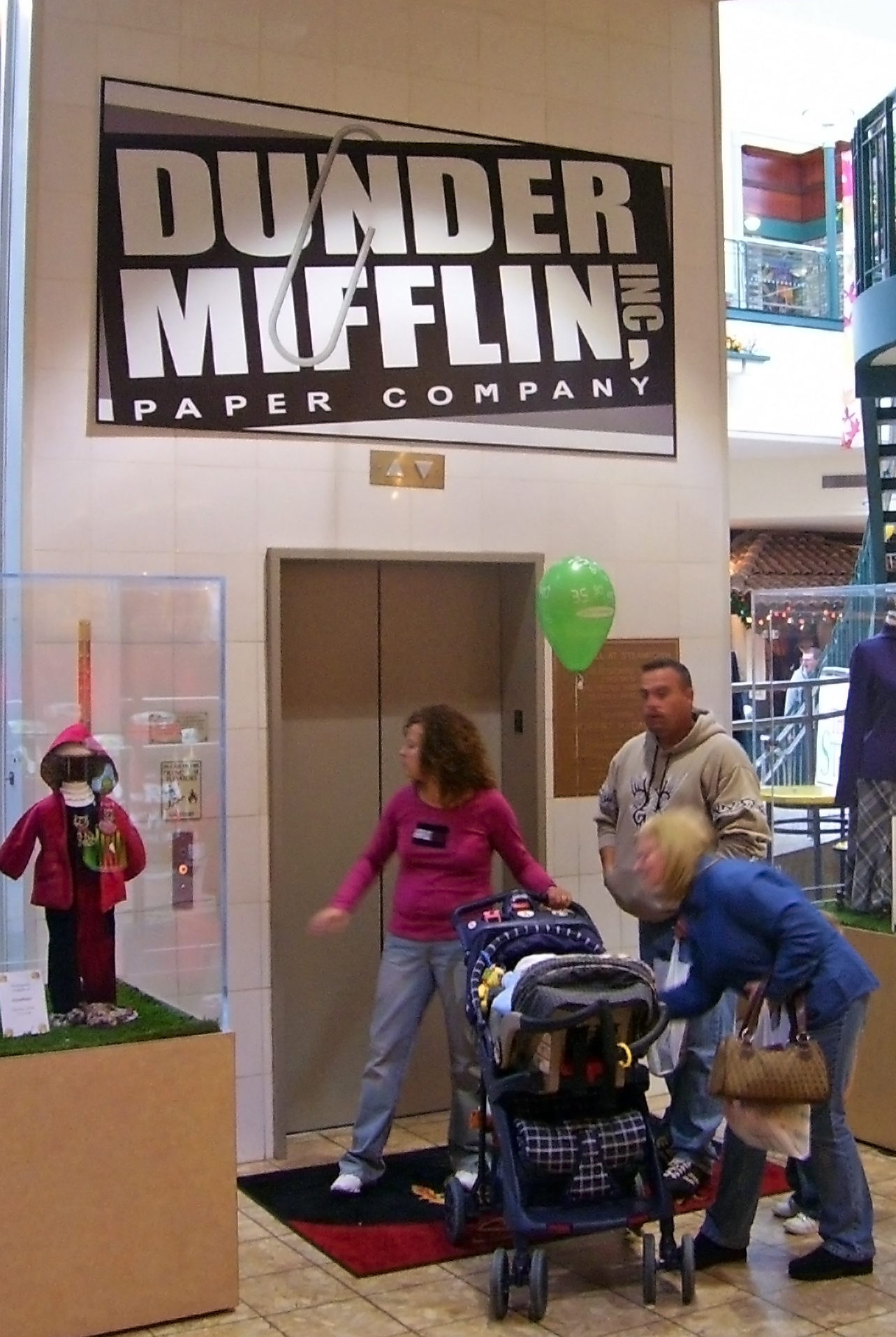
Dunder Mifflin logo displayed in Scranton's Mall at Steamtown, frequently mentioned on the show

The company was depicted as based in New York City, with branches in smaller Northeastern cities. Episodes are set in the Scranton branch, but other branches have been mentioned and seen. The now-closed Stamford, Connecticut branch was seen when Jim Halpert (John Krasinski) transferred there during the first half of the third season. Another episode, "Branch Wars", gave viewers a brief glimpse of the Utica branch, one of several purportedly in upstate New York. Zbornak says that the city was on the shortlist for where to base the show, with some of its writers having ties to Central New York, and that they always intended for at least a branch office to be located there, for reasons of phonetics. Zbornak says, "Utica was just such a different-sounding name than Scranton", but also that "we had done a little research and thought our kind of business could survive in Utica."

A Buffalo branch has been mentioned in several episodes, and a Rochester office was also mentioned in the episode titled "Lecture Circuit". The Dunder Mifflin website also lists a Yonkers branch. Albany is yet another mentioned New York location, which in a deleted scene in "Stress Relief" is revealed to have closed. It is also said that there are branches in other states, including: Akron, Ohio; Camden, New Jersey; and Nashua, New Hampshire. In "Company Picnic", it is announced that the Camden and Yonkers branches have closed and that the Buffalo branch is about to close. In "Boys and Girls", a Pittsfield, Massachusetts branch was mentioned by Jan as having been shut down when their warehouse workers unionized. The episode "Turf War" focuses on the closing of the Binghamton branch and how reps from the Syracuse branch are competing with Scranton employees for Binghamton's old clients.

Business writer Megan Barnett has pointed out parallels between Dunder Mifflin and the real-life W.B. Mason paper company based near Boston, in Brockton, Massachusetts. It is similarly regional in focus, serving corporate and institutional customers in New England and the Mid-Atlantic states. Like Dunder Mifflin, its original product line (rubber stamps) was something other than paper, and it faced stiff competition from national and international chains. It, too, has a branch office in Stamford, but Mason's has remained open. In 2009, it had an accounting scandal that resulted in a $545,000 payment to corporate customers, much as Dunder Mifflin had to deal with the arrest of Ryan Howard for fraud the year before.

=== Depiction of corporate culture ===
The company's "clearly dysfunctional" top-down management style is a major source of tension on the show, noted Chicago-based writer Ramsin Canon. Corporate headquarters rejects the television commercial Michael created, as he, in turn, insisted on his ideas for the commercial. Ryan Howard (B. J. Novak), who began as a temp, becomes Michael's new boss because he has an M.B.A. despite never having sold any paper or paper products. The show's depiction of a dysfunctional corporate culture has led some commentators to liken Dunder Mifflin to the software maker Initech in Mike Judge's cult comedy Office Space and the nameless company in which the Dilbert comic strip is set.

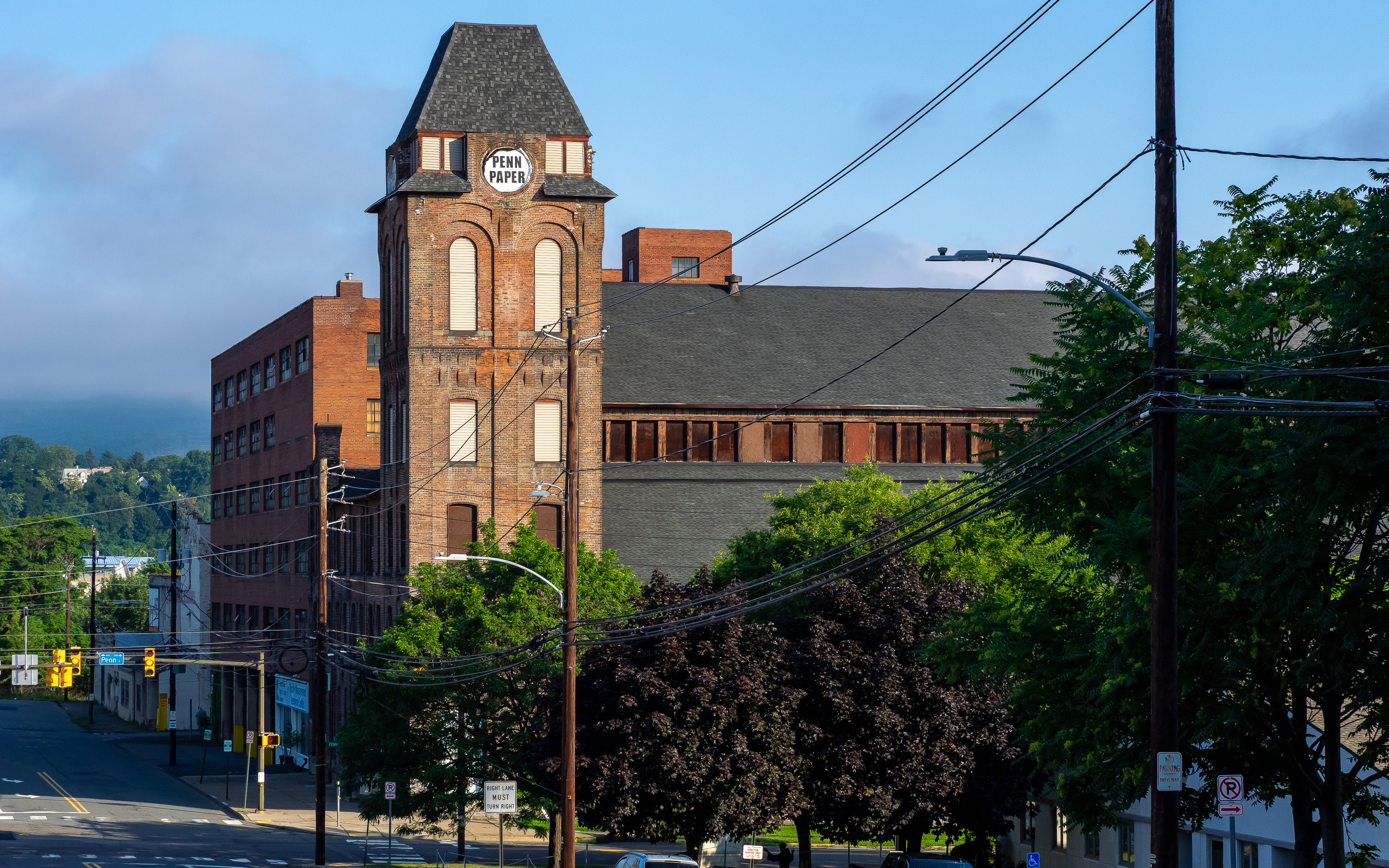
The Pennsylvania Paper & Supply Company tower, seen in The Office's opening credits

Dunder Mifflin is also depicted as needing help to accommodate the demands of a diverse workforce. Episodes have focused on sensitivity training sessions and other informal efforts. Sexual harassment has occurred often enough, however, that it has lent its name to an episode. Employment lawyer Julie Elgar started a blog analyzing each episode for plot developments likely to be actionable if they occurred in real life and estimating the legal bill and possible verdict the company would incur should a suit be filed—as Michael's former supervisor, Jan Levinson (Melora Hardin) did in one episode, alleging wrongful termination. Greg Daniels, the show's creator, said many episode plotlines are based on anecdotes recounted during the sensitivity training he and the other members of the show's cast and crew are required to take annually as employees of NBC, a Comcast subsidiary. The episode "Boys and Girls" showed that the company strongly resisted unionization efforts by its employees, to the point of closing down a branch, as many real companies do or threaten to do in the same situation.

== Locations and sets used ==
The office and warehouse of the Scranton branch office were sets on the production company's office in Van Nuys, California, although a real office was used in the show's first season. For episodes in season two and beyond, scenes set in the parking lot used the exterior of the production company's office building. Since the stage set had no windows, writer Jennifer Celotta's office was dressed to look like Michael Scott's when the script called for him or someone else to look out the window into the parking lot. In the second and subsequent seasons, the office interiors and exteriors are at a different location in Van Nuys.

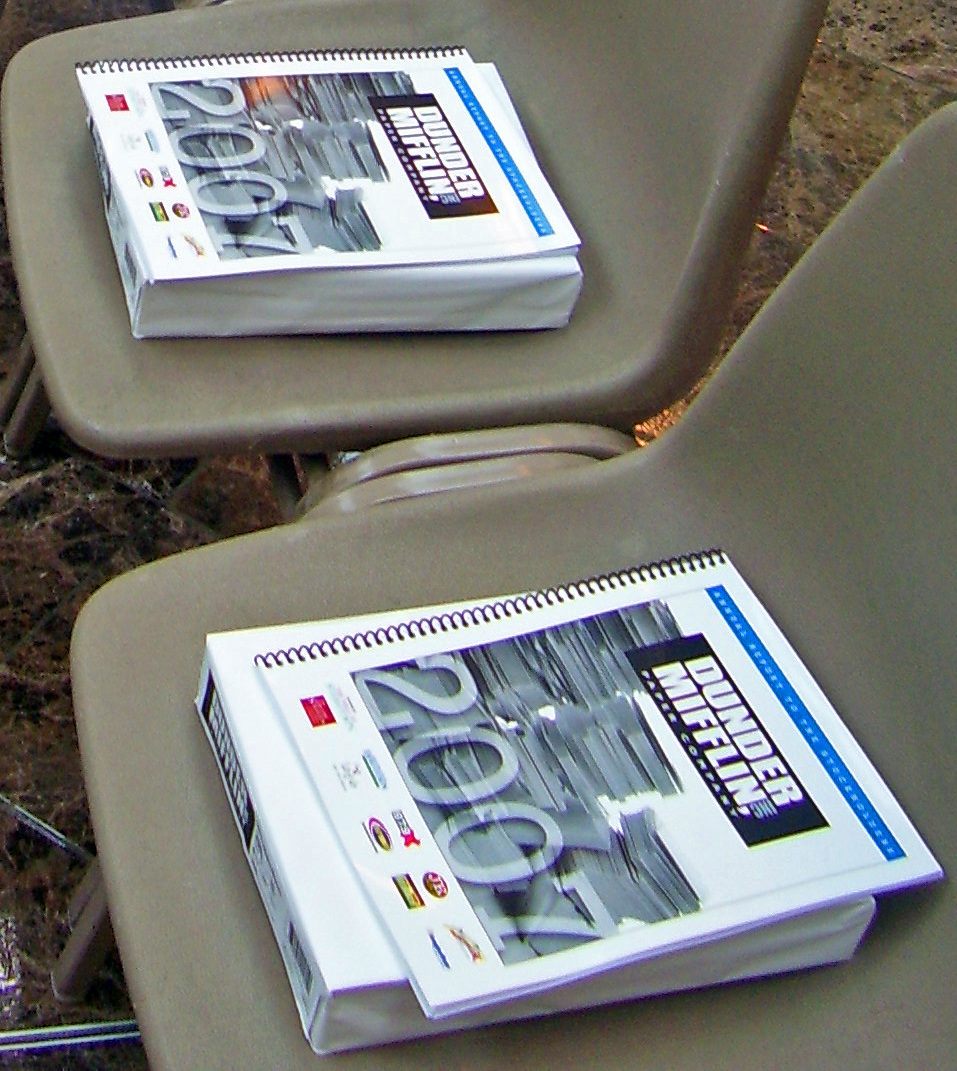
Annual reports and paper on seats of "uncommon stockholders" at 2007 The Office convention.

Some viewers have presumed that the Pennsylvania Paper & Supply Company's tower, a downtown Scranton landmark that appears in video footage shot by cast member John Krasinski for the show's opening credits, is the Dunder Mifflin office. The real company, which also sells paper and office supplies, has welcomed the exposure (and increase in business) and has a ground-floor showroom where it sells both its products and T-shirts with the tower. In 2008 it announced it would add a Dunder Mifflin logo to the circular insets near the top of the tower. As of December 2021, this logo can be seen through Google's Street View at the corner of Vine Street and Penn Avenue. Mifflin Avenue ends adjacent to the Penn Paper & Supply building.

== Presence in real world ==
The show's success has led to selling actual products with the Dunder Mifflin logo as souvenirs. NBC sells branded T-shirts, mugs, calendars, and other items at its website, as well as in the NBC store located in New York City. In 2006, the website 80stees.com ranked Dunder Mifflin second only to Duff Beer from The Simpsons as the best fictional brand.

At the first annual The Office convention in Scranton in 2007, fans who had paid for reserved seating at an "uncommon stockholders meeting" in the Mall at Steamtown received an annual report and complimentary ream of paper. A nearby elevator shaft is also decorated with the company logo. While the Scranton branch's address, 1725 Slough Avenue, does not exist (the street name was invented as a tribute to the original British version of the show, set in Slough, near London), the company logo can be seen two places in the city's downtown section outside the mall: on one of the pedestrian overpasses along Lackawanna Avenue, and a lamppost banner in front of City Hall.

In November 2011, Staples Inc. announced that they would be selling their product of manufactured paper under the "Dunder Mifflin" name, under license from NBC's parent company, Comcast. The Dunder Mifflin products were produced and sold by Quill.com, a wholly owned subsidiary of Staples. The brand expanded its paper product line beyond manufactured paper in November 2012. In August 2022, the production held a convention at the Meadowlands in New Jersey. Dubbed "Dundercon", the event allowed fans to meet up with cast members from the show.

== Other appearances ==
- In the NBC series Las Vegas episode "The Story of Owe", Dunder Mifflin is mentioned to have booked a convention.
- In Randal's Monday, a Dunder Mifflin Warehouse 42 sign is visible in a city scene.
- In the Peacock series The Paper, Dunder Mifflin is said to have been purchased in 2019 by the Toledo, Ohio based Enervate corporation, a conglomerate which specializes in various paper-based businesses (their most successful division sells Softees brand toilet paper). The Scranton branch of Dunder Mifflin closed as of 2019, with the company "One and Done Laser" having taken up their former office space. Enervate offered to transfer at least some Scranton employees to their offices in Toledo; accountant Oscar Martinez is the only person known to have accepted the offer.
