= Jim Halpert =

Fictional character on NBC's The Office

- The Office character
- Jim Halpert as portrayed by John Krasinski.
- First appearance: "Pilot" (2005)
- Last appearance: "Finale" (2013)
- Created by: Greg Daniels; Ricky Gervais; Stephen Merchant
- Based on: Tim Canterbury (British counterpart)
- Portrayed by: John Krasinski

In-universe information
- Nicknames: "Big Tuna" (and several variations thereof, by Andy Bernard); "Big Turkey"; “King of the Whites”; “Jimbo” (by Michael Scott)
- Occupation: Sales Representative, Dunder Mifflin, Scranton, Pennsylvania; Sales Representative, Dunder Mifflin Sabre, Scranton, Pennsylvania; Sales Representative, Dunder Mifflin, Stamford, Connecticut; Junior Employee, Dunder Mifflin Sabre, Scranton, Pennsylvania; Assistant Regional Manager, Dunder Mifflin, Scranton, Pennsylvania; Regional Co-Manager, Dunder Mifflin, Scranton, Pennsylvania; Regional Co-Manager, Dunder Mifflin Sabre, Scranton, Pennsylvania; Regional Manager, Dunder Mifflin Sabre, Scranton, Pennsylvania; Assistant to the Regional Manager, Dunder Mifflin, Scranton, Pennsylvania; President of New Acquisitions, Athleap, Austin, Texas
- Family: Gerald Halpert (father); Betsy Halpert (mother); Tom Halpert (brother); Pete Halpert (brother); Larisa Halpert (sister)
- Spouse: Pam Beesly (m. 2009)
- Significant others: Katy Moore (ex-girlfriend); Karen Filippelli (ex-girlfriend)
- Children: Cecelia Marie Halpert (daughter); Phillip Halpert (son)
- Relatives: Marcy Halpert (sister-in-law); Vanessa Halpert (niece); Unnamed nephew Michael Halpert (distant cousin)
- Nationality: American

James Duncan Halpert is a fictional character in the American version of the television sitcom The Office, portrayed by John Krasinski. He is introduced as a sales representative at the Scranton branch of paper distribution company Dunder Mifflin, before temporarily transferring to the Stamford branch in the third season. Upon the merger of Scranton and Stamford branches, he becomes Assistant Regional Manager, and later co-manager alongside Michael Scott during the sixth-season episode arc from "The Promotion" to "The Manager and the Salesman". The character is based on Tim Canterbury from the original version of The Office.

His character serves as the intelligent, mild-mannered straight man role to Michael. He is also notable for his rivalrous pranks on fellow salesman Dwight Schrute and his romantic interest in receptionist Pam Beesly, whom he begins dating in the fourth season, proposes to in the fifth, marries in the sixth, and has children with in the sixth and eighth.

The character is named after a friend, reportedly "since before kindergarten," of Greg Daniels, the developer and executive producer of The Office. The real-life Jim Halpert has been a partner in the Washington, D.C. office of the law firm DLA Piper, the General Counsel for the White House Office of the National Cyber Director, and – since his July 2022 diagnosis of amyotrophic lateral sclerosis – an advocate for ALS research funding and member of the board of governors of the Robert Packard Center for ALS Research at Johns Hopkins University.

== Casting ==
Krasinski auditioned for the role, along with Josh Radnor, Hamish Linklater, John Cho, and Adam Scott. Scott would later play Ben Wyatt on NBC's Parks and Recreation, which was created by The Office's creator Greg Daniels and producer Michael Schur. Lance Krall also auditioned, according to Angela Kinsey and Jenna Fischer in the Office Ladies podcast.

Krasinski was ultimately chosen due to his chemistry with Jenna Fischer, who portrayed his co-worker and future wife Pam Beesly. The couple is known for being one of the most recognizable and beloved couples on American television.

== Character history ==
=== Seasons 1–3 ===
Jim Halpert is first introduced in the pilot episode; he is adamant throughout the series about his job as a salesman at Dunder Mifflin Paper being a temporary one, stating: "Right now, this is just a job. If I advance any higher, this would be my career. And if this were my career, I'd have to throw myself in front of a train." This outlook is most apparent in the elaborate pranks that he plays on his workmates, primarily Dwight, as well as his sarcastic remarks, facial expressions to the film crew and his provoking comments during employee meetings. However, Jim succeeds professionally and is consistently one of the best salesmen.

A major plot point throughout the series is Jim's relationship with Pam Beesly, who is engaged to Roy Anderson, a Dunder Mifflin warehouse worker. Throughout the first two seasons, incidents such as Pam falling asleep on Jim's shoulder in "Diversity Day" and drunkenly kissing him in "The Dundies" show a possibility of the feelings being mutual; however, Pam never acts on them and remains engaged to Roy.

On one occasion, in "The Fight," his flirting goes a little too far, causing her to shut him down immediately when their co-workers take notice. Jim is startled by her abruptness, but she eventually forgives him. Feeling bored with his job, tortured by his situation with Pam and guilty about a stack of complaints Dwight has lodged against him, Jim investigates a transfer to Dunder Mifflin's branch in Stamford, Connecticut.

In the season-two finale, "Casino Night," Jim confesses his love for Pam in the office. Pam, whose wedding to Roy was planned out and just weeks away, clearly shows her anguish by making out with him that night, but then gently turns him down. Jim tearfully walks away, but later kisses her in the office, closing the second season. In the season-three premiere "Gay Witch Hunt," it is revealed that Jim did transfer to Stamford, despite the fact that Pam has called off her wedding and he clearly still harbors intense feelings for her.

Things begin to look up for Jim when he befriends salesperson Karen Filippelli in Stamford, and when the company board of directors decides to close the Scranton branch, Jim is named assistant regional manager of the newly created "Dunder Mifflin Northeast." However, the company's plans change, and the Stamford branch closes instead, with a few employees being offered a transfer to Scranton; Jim is offered to be the assistant regional manager at Scranton. Jim is at first unwilling to return to Scranton because of Pam but eventually decides to do so. Karen, who has grown fond of Jim and wishes to pursue a relationship with him, also transfers to Scranton.

In "The Merger," Jim and Pam reunite; Pam is overjoyed, but Jim is clearly uncomfortable. He lets Pam know that he is seeing someone, and gradually Karen is introduced as his girlfriend. As Jim settles back in at Scranton, he uses his promotion as an excuse to avoid his old interactions and pranks with Pam, claiming that pulling pranks is not appropriate for his position. However, in time, Jim does return to his old ways, especially targeting Dwight and Andy Bernard, another Stamford transfer.

Toward the middle of the season, it becomes clear that Jim's unresolved feelings toward Pam are affecting his relationship with Karen. In "The Return," Jim decides to pull a prank on Andy; however, Karen is unable and Ryan unwilling to aid him, so he turns to Pam, who readily agrees. Their interaction during the prank causes Karen to feel threatened. She confronts Jim, and he finally admits to still having feelings for Pam. Despite this fact, their relationship continues.

In "Cocktails," Roy trashes the bar when Pam tells him she kissed Jim during "Casino Night." Roy then attempts to attack Jim at work in "The Negotiation," but Dwight saves Jim from Roy by using pepper spray on him. Roy is fired, but when Pam assures Jim that it is over between her and Roy for good, Jim doesn't believe it and tells her so.

In "Beach Games," during a company outing at the beach, Pam confesses to Jim in front of everyone that he was the reason she broke off her wedding to Roy. She also states that she has missed their friendship since he left Scranton for Stamford. Later that night, Jim tells Pam that he feels as if he never really came back from Stamford, tacitly admitting that he has actively been fighting his feelings for her all year. However, Jim's relationship with Karen and pending interview for a corporate position which would require his relocation to New York City, still obstructing a potential romance.

In "The Job," Jim, Karen, and Michael each interview for the corporate position. During the interview, he notices a caring note from Pam in his briefcase. After the interview he drives back to Scranton, leaving Karen without a ride. Back at the Scranton office, Pam is reflecting on her history with Jim, stating that they “never got the timing right” and were just “too similar”. Jim then suddenly interrupts the session to ask her out to dinner, much to her surprise. Flustered and overjoyed, Pam accepts the invitation.

=== Seasons 4–6 ===
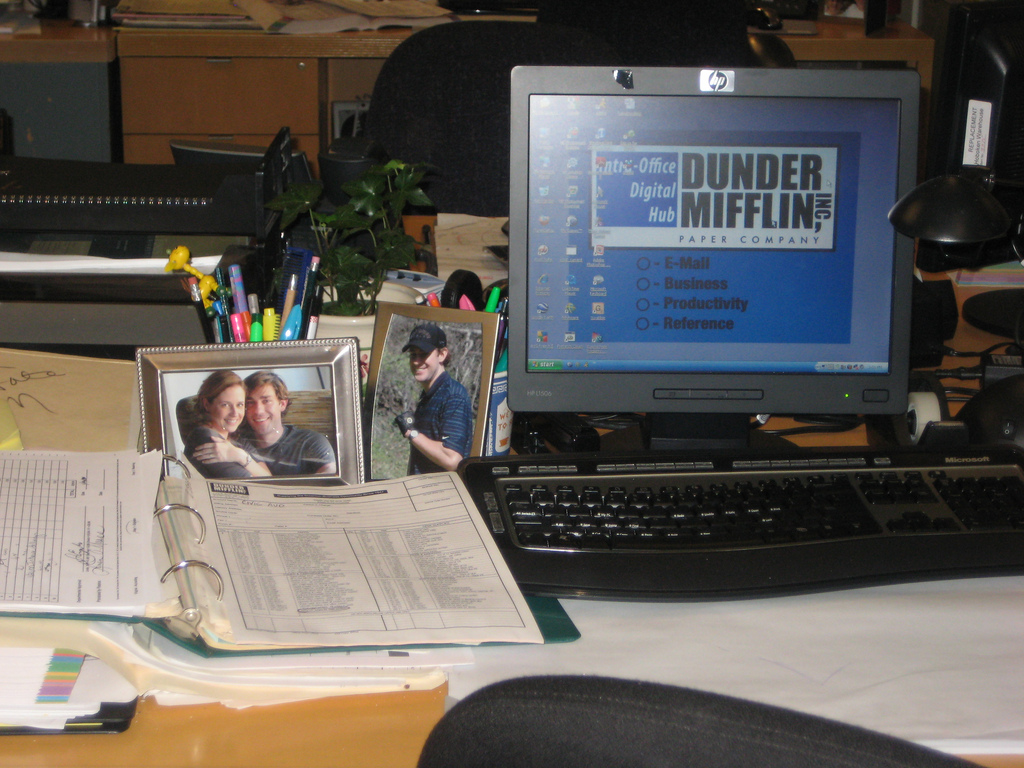
Jim's desk on the set of the show in 2009

At the beginning of the season, it is revealed that Jim and Pam are dating, and that Karen had left the Scranton branch shortly after Jim broke up with her.

In the episodes "Survivor Man" and "Night Out," Jim takes on his role as manager while Michael is out of the office. Both times, however, his attempts at making the office better go awry. Ryan, annoyed by Jim's popularity with his boss David Wallace, gives Jim a performance warning in "Did I Stutter?" citing "goofing off with Dwight" and "spending time at reception" as productivity problems, despite his high sale numbers.

In "Goodbye, Toby," Jim shows his happiness and support for Pam getting into the Pratt Institute, where she will be for the next three months. He plans to propose at Toby's going away party until Andy proposes in front of everybody to Angela, who accepts. Jim puts his ring back in his pocket and postpones the engagement. Instead, he proposes during the season-five premiere, "Weight Loss," during a rainy last-minute lunch date at an Interstate rest stop between Scranton and New York City, where Pam is attending Pratt.

Jim and Pam keep in touch during her time at art school via webcam, instant messaging, and frequent phone calls. Jim eagerly awaits Pam's return in "Business Trip." He is sad but supportive when Pam calls to tell him she has failed a class and can't come home yet. That afternoon he finds Pam waiting in the parking lot, claiming that she hated art school anyway. He purchases his parents' house and begins to take his career more seriously. When new Vice President Charles Miner (Idris Elba) arrives at the office to oversee Michael, he and Jim immediately clash as Charles condescends to, and dismisses, Jim as an underachiever and a smartass with a "made-up position."

Charles scoffs when Jim is invited to sit in on a meeting with David Wallace about the Michael Scott Paper Company. However, Jim comes off as intelligent and professional and persuades Michael to be bought out. In the process, he finally stands up to Charles after Charles makes up to their boss, prompting Jim to make a snide remark to his face. Upon realizing Dwight's incompetence during the meeting, Charles encourages Jim to speak to Michael. As a new receptionist has already been hired, Pam is rehired in sales, alongside Jim.

During "Company Picnic," Pam injures her ankle during a volleyball game and Jim takes her to the hospital. The camera crew is stationed outside an exam room while a doctor updates Jim and Pam on her condition. Jim and Pam are suddenly seen embracing, looking shocked and ecstatic, heavily implying that Pam is pregnant.

In season six, Pam's pregnancy is confirmed, and Jim is promoted to regional co-manager, alongside Michael, in "The Meeting." His promotion causes problems in the office as the staff doesn't take him seriously and he is often in a power struggle with Michael. When Dunder Mifflin files for bankruptcy and is taken over by Sabre, a company that sells printers, Jim chooses to become a salesman again, largely because Sabre's uncapped commission means a huge pay increase.

Jim and Pam marry in the hour-long episode "Niagara." When their guests' craziness threatens to ruin the wedding day, they run off and are privately married on the Maid of the Mist before returning to take part in their planned church wedding. Their daughter, Cecelia Marie Halpert is born several months later, in "The Delivery."

=== Season 7–9 ===
In season seven, some of Jim's vulnerabilities are displayed. He displays mild jealousy when he meets Danny Cordray, a superior paper salesman who went on a few dates with Pam while he was in Stamford. His sales skills remain strong, when in "WUPHF.com" it is revealed that he has already maxed out his sales cap for the year and cannot make any more commissions, leading him to seek goofy respite in the office until Gabe Lewis chides him to stop bothering everyone. Since Gabe was unsympathetic to Jim's situation, Jim then sets up a prank that ends with Gabe being forced to listen to an audiobook version of Jo Bennett's entire autobiography. In "The Seminar," it is revealed he has had the highest sales out of the entire Scranton branch for at least three months running.

In "Goodbye, Michael," Jim is the only one to figure out that Michael is leaving earlier than he said and opts to stay quiet to let Michael leave, but he tells Pam so she can get to him at the airport before he leaves. He also emotionally tells Michael he's been the best boss he's ever had, and they part on good terms. After Michael's initial replacement, Deangelo Vickers, suffers a traumatic brain injury, Jo offers Jim the position of interim manager, which Jim rejects. Jo later calls Jim as "the only man who turned me down."

Early in season 8, it is revealed that Jim will be a father for the second time as Pam is expecting a son, Phillip, who first appears in the episode "Jury Duty". Jim also had to deal with a crush from co-worker Cathy Simms, who unsuccessfully tries to seduce him while they are part of the Sabre Store team in Tallahassee.

In "New Guys," Jim reveals that he was given an offer to help his friend start a sports marketing company in Philadelphia called Athlead. At first, he turns it down but later reveals that he accepted the offer. Pam doesn't find out until "Andy's Ancestry," and although she is supportive, she is later concerned about Jim not having told her sooner and about how much money he has put into it. Jim gets permission from David Wallace to take up the second job, and in "The Target" he convinces Stanley and Phyllis to agree to cover his duties on the days that he is away.

In "Suit Warehouse," Jim offers Darryl a chance to join him at the new job. Although Darryl has a not-so-perfect interview, he does get the position thanks to his preparation and Jim's recommendation. Later, Jim and Darryl become roommates, although in "Vandalism" Darryl is annoyed at Jim's messy and sloppy living habits.

Jim's weekly commute to Philadelphia causes increasing strain on his marriage until in "Customer Loyalty," it comes to a head when he misses Cece's dance recital and then angrily blames Pam for not videotaping it. Tearfully, Pam breaks down and confides in Brian, the boom mic operator of the documentary crew.

In "Moving On," Pam interviews for a job in Philadelphia, but then reveals to Jim that she doesn't really want to move there after all.

In "Finale," Jim serves as Dwight's best man during his wedding to Angela, where Pam is a bridesmaid. Jim and Pam also finalize their plan to move to Austin, where Jim will rejoin Athlead (now named Athleap) with Darryl. He plans to quit Dunder Mifflin, but Dwight insists on firing him and Pam instead, so they can receive a generous severance package. In his final interview, Jim thanks the documentary crew for giving him the opportunity to show his children many important parts of his life, and after a callback to his first interview, finally deems his job as "amazing".

== Appearances ==
Jim appeared in every episode of The Office. In "Mafia," only his voice is heard, while the clip show episode "The Banker" features Jim in flashbacks of previous episodes, and Jim only appears in new footage momentarily, and without any lines. Additionally, in the season-seven episode "Ultimatum," Jim only appears in the cold open, and is absent without explanation for the rest of the episode. The cold open was actually filmed the previous season and recycled for the episode because John Krasinski was on location shooting a movie.

== Reception ==
In the media, Jim is sometimes called an everyman. In her article "Breaking Out of the First-Job Trap" for U.S. News & World Report, Liz Wolgemuth used Jim's character as a template for an essay on under-motivated, young college graduates. In an article on stereotypical office worker profiles, Jim was identified as the worker who is "drifting along in a job, [while] you put off asking yourself hard questions about career plans."
