= Threat Level Midnight =

- The Office episode
- The poster for Threat Level Midnight. Michael Gallenberg, the series' production designer created the poster on his own time without being asked.
- Episode no.: Season 7 Episode 17
- Directed by: Tucker Gates
- Written by: B. J. Novak
- Cinematography by: Matt Sohn
- Editing by: David Rogers; Claire Scanlon
- Production code: 7016
- Original air date: February 17, 2011

Guest appearances
- David Denman as Roy Anderson; Melora Hardin as Jan Levinson; Rashida Jones as Karen Filippelli; David Koechner as Todd Packer; Linda Purl as Helene Beesly; Mike Bruner as Tony Gardner; Noel Petok as Troy Underbridge

Episode chronology
| ← Previous "PDA" | Next → "Todd Packer" |
- The Office (American season 7)

"Threat Level Midnight" is the seventeenth episode of the seventh season of the American comedy television series The Office, and the show's 143rd episode overall. It originally aired on NBC on February 17, 2011. The episode was written by B. J. Novak and directed by Tucker Gates.

The series depicts the everyday lives of office employees in the Scranton, Pennsylvania branch of the fictional Dunder Mifflin Paper Company. In this episode, Michael Scott (Steve Carell) screens his action film Threat Level Midnight to the office after a decade of writing, shooting, re-shooting, and editing. (Note: There is some ambiguity around how long Michael was working on Threat Level Midnight. In the cold open he says there was "three years of writing, one year of shooting, four years of reshooting and two years of editing", which at face value adds up to 10 years, but since Michael is likely rounding the time periods to the nearest year, it could be anywhere from 8 to 12 years. Later in the episode he says the film has been his dream for 11 years, but this does not necessarily equal the amount of time he was actually working on the film.) This film features Michael as Agent Michael Scarn, Dwight Schrute (Rainn Wilson) as Scarn's robot butler, and Jim Halpert (John Krasinski) as Scarn's archnemesis "Goldenface".

The episode's genesis stems from the second season episode "The Client", in which the office discovers Michael's incomplete film screenplay. "Threat Level Midnight" features the reappearance of several actors and actresses who had not appeared on the show in years. It also marks the final appearance for Rashida Jones (Karen Filippelli). Due to the nature of Michael's film, scenes were filmed to create the illusion that they had been shot years prior to the episode. "Threat Level Midnight" was viewed by 6.41 million viewers and received a 3.3 rating among adults between the age of 18 and 49. The episode was the highest-rated NBC series of the week that it aired, and received acclaim from critics, many of whom enjoyed the humor and the continuity references to the show's past. In December 2019, the entire film (25 minutes with no episode clips) was released on The Office's YouTube channel.

== Synopsis ==
Michael Scott screens his action film Threat Level Midnight to the office after a decade of writing, shooting, re-shooting and editing. The film's characters are played by people who have either worked at the Dunder Mifflin Scranton branch in the past decade, or who Michael has interacted with in the last few years.

The plot for the movie is as follows: after secret agent Michael Scarn (played by Michael) is forced into retirement due to the death of his wife Catherine Zeta-Scarn at the hands of Goldenface (played by Jim Halpert), the President of the United States of America (played by Darryl Philbin) requests that he prevent Goldenface from blowing up the NHL All-Star Game and killing several hostages. Scarn goes undercover and learns how to play hockey, killing another hockey player (played by Oscar Martinez) to make it into the game, but after confronting Goldenface, he is shot. He later recuperates but learns that the President was in on it all along. Depressed, he goes to a bar to drown his sorrows. The patrons of the bar sing a song called "The Scarn" which he danced to with his wife, which cheers Scarn up immensely. With his courage restored, Scarn is able to save the day and blow up Goldenface in the process.

Michael had shown the office a "work in progress" cut of the film years ago, but the employees all mistook it for a comedy, and Michael was so offended by their laughing that he shut down the screening. Everyone is very eager to see Michael's film, albeit only because they all appear in it, and Pam Halpert warns everyone to be mindful of how sensitive Michael is and not laugh. However, Pam is unable to keep herself from crying out in horror when she sees her mother cast in the film as a scantily clad nurse, and Jim fails to fully suppress his laughter at the scene of "The Scarn", so Michael angrily stops the movie and takes it away. Michael asks Holly Flax what she thought and she does not seem impressed. Michael gets angry at her because he considers the film his "dream". He offers the rest of the office the opportunity to finish seeing the film, which they happily accept. While watching, Michael begins noting how the film is not really very good; he steps outside and tells Holly that it is a bad film but also one that people are having fun watching. They sit down and laugh with the rest of the office through the film's conclusion.

== Production ==
=== Writing and casting ===
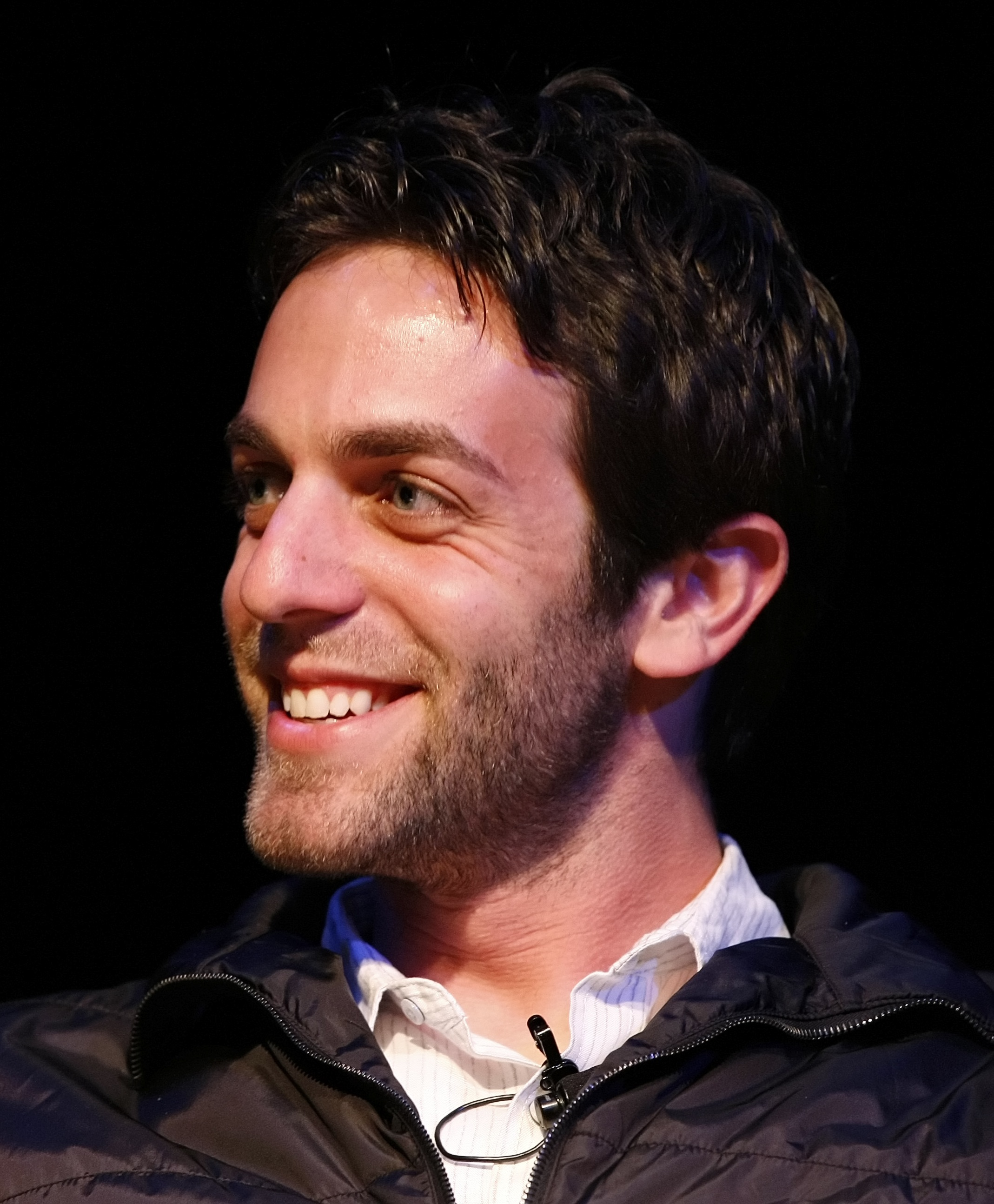
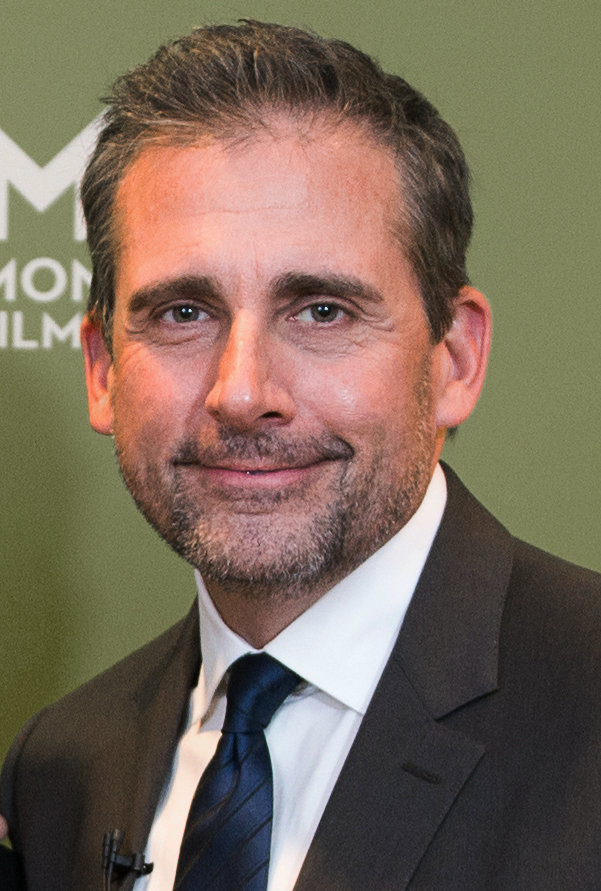
The episode was written by B. J. Novak (left) at the behest of departing series star Steve Carell (right).

This episode was written by executive producer B. J. Novak, who also portrays Ryan Howard on the show. It was directed by Tucker Gates, his fourth directing credit of the series. Though Novak is the sole credited writer for the episode, he has said Charlie Grandy had a significant role in writing it, including coming up with the Scarn quip "Go puck yourself!" and the "Threat Level Midnight" rap. Michael's screenplay for Threat Level Midnight was the subplot for second season episode "The Client", and had subsequently been referenced to in "Email Surveillance", "Product Recall", "Money", "Dinner Party", and "Prince Family Paper". The idea for the episode came from series' star Steve Carell, who was leaving the show at the end of the season. He said that he enjoyed the idea behind the "Threat Level Midnight" script and wanted to do a story centered on it.

Several former recurring and minor characters make reappearances. Rashida Jones, who portrayed Karen Fillipelli, noted that it felt like "a time warp" to be asked to reappear on the show. Jan Levinson, Michael's former boss and lover played by Melora Hardin, reappeared in the "Jan-as-diva mode" previously seen in the episode "Sex Ed". Tony Gardner, portrayed by Mike Bruner, cameos as a pianist. Editor David Rogers objected that Tony would never return to Scranton after Michael fired him on his first day; Novak argued that Tony might have appeared in the movie because he was "intrigued" and "flattered" that Michael—after apologizing "profusely"—asked him, or that he might have been "lonely".

Michael Scarn's deceased wife is heavily implied to be actress Catherine Zeta-Jones; Novak admitted that no one bothered to ask Zeta-Jones's permission to do this.

Andy Buckley, who portrayed David Wallace, former CFO of Dunder Mifflin, was originally billed as a guest star for this episode and his character was supposed to have a part in Michael's movie. When NBC first aired the episode, Wallace's scenes were not shown. It was revealed by Novak that, in the script, Wallace was Michael's first choice as Goldenface, but turned it down because "it wouldn't look good to people at Corporate". Furthermore, Buckley filmed a talking head interview, which had his character exclaiming his regret in not taking the role. This scene was deleted due to time constraints. Apart from the complete cut of Michael's film, no deleted scenes from "Threat Level Midnight" appear on the Season 7 DVD. However, Peacock's "Superfan" cut of the episode includes never-before-seen deleted scenes. The talking head interview was filmed using a green screen.

The script also had a scene that brought back Amy Adams' character Katy, but it was cut because Adams was working on a movie during the time this episode was filmed. Ellie Kemper, who portrays Erin Hannon on the series, did not appear in the movie; Novak pointed out that Michael had finished his filming long before she arrived at the office, and had spent the remaining years "editing and procrastinating".

=== Filming ===
B. J. Novak cites the episode as the "most conceptually ambitious" in the show's history. More than half the episode consisted of footage from the film. Originally, the producers considered showing just the movie, but they felt that it "would feel like a gimmick or experiment", and so it was decided that the film would be intercut with shots of the office reacting to the film. These shots were all completed on the first day of filming, before there was any footage of Michael's film, so the actors had to react based on cues of what was happening in the film, without being able to actually see what they were reacting to.

In order to make the film seem as if Michael had created it, the color was washed out in post-production to make it seem as if it were of a cheaper quality than the normal high-quality film that the series used. Certain shooting methods, like hand-held and zooms, were nixed, except for in cases where they could be presented in a "poorly-executed" manner. This was done in a way to make it appear that Michael at least knew what he was doing; Novak explained that the crew "didn't want the joke of the episode to be how bad he was at filmmaking" because it would "be a little easy and a little out of character". To create the fake dummy of Toby that exploded, Paul Lieberstein was required to spend several hours in a full-face mold that reportedly "unnerved him greatly". Two molds were made. Both were filled with explosives, but one was filled with fake blood. The detonation of both was shot with slow-motion cameras. However, the explosion of the dummy head filled with fake blood was considered by the producers to be "too disturbing for us and arguably too disturbing for Michael", and so the tamer explosion was used. It was the most expensive shot of the episode, just as in-universe it was the most expensive shot in Michael's film.

Due to the nature of Michael's film, Novak realized that scenes would have to be filmed as if they had been shot years prior to the episode. In order to successfully pull this off, editor David Rogers and script supervisor Veda Semame were tasked with "mapping out" every scene to make sure the continuity of the series was preserved. Novak later elaborated on the continuity during an interview with The Office fansite OfficeTally. The scene featuring "The Scarn" would have been filmed after the corporate merger that occurred during the third season; this would explain Karen's willingness to deliver her lines, as she would be "eager to fit in". Stanley's voiceover was recorded "on a lunch break" sometime after the fourth season episode "Local Ad" because he had "got a big kick out of seeing himself" in Michael's commercial. Helene's scenes were filmed sometime when Michael was dating her during the early part of the sixth season.

In addition to the mapping out of sequences, the episode features a short sequence that was shot to look as if it had been filmed during the show's second season, although the scene itself was filmed in 2011. Novak explained that, in order to recreate the shot, great lengths had to be taken to ensure the authenticity of the footage. Series Department Head make-up artist LaVerne Caracuzzi-Milazzo and Hair Department Head Kim M. Ferry "put great care and effort into recreating the characters' looks from earlier seasons"; Novak, for instance wore "the same bright blue shirt that Ryan used to favor" and fake sideburns were glued onto the actor's face to "match the era". John Krasinski's hair was fashioned to Jim's old hairdo and Jenna Fischer wore one of Pam's old outfits. Novak also stated that the actors "remembered those dynamics [from the second season] and fell right back into them." This is not the first nor the last time this trick has been used on the show. For instance, during the cold opening for the sixth season episode "Shareholder Meeting" featuring "Recyclops", a montage of Dwight harassing past receptionists was shown. Furthermore, the episode "Customer Loyalty" from the ninth season featured a montage of Jim setting up a prank supposedly during the show's second season.

Due to Novak misremembering that Darryl had been clean-shaven in his early appearances, Craig Robinson shaved off his beard and mustache for his role as the president of the United States. In the script this character is called President Jackson, which Novak intended as a joke about Michael being clueless about racial issues, in that he gave a fictional black president the same name as Andrew Jackson, a president who has attracted controversy due to his racist policies. Unlike his character Jim Halpert, Krasinski greatly enjoyed the role of Goldenface; Novak said he had never seen Krasinski so happy.

== Cultural references ==
According to the clippings on the wall, Scarn had previously saved the NFL, MLB, and NBA all-star games. Several Billy Joel songs play throughout the episode, such as "Running on Ice" and "Pressure". A Dave Barry page-a-day calendar is featured in a montage to illustrate the passing of time. Michael mentions both Ocean's 11 and Antz in defense of his movie. The latter is featured in a diatribe Michael delivers about Woody Allen and how you should always listen to your fans.

One of the episode's deleted scenes is a post-credits scene featuring Michael Scarn and his robot butler breaking the fourth wall and telling the audience to "go home". This is a reference to Ferris Bueller's Day Off's post-credits scene. In the YouTube, uncut release, this scene is present.

The name of the character Cherokee Jack is a reference to the film Red Zone Cuba, known for having been featured on Mystery Science Theater 3000.

== Reception ==
In its original American broadcast on February 17, 2011, "Threat Level Midnight" was viewed by an estimated 6.41 million viewers and received a 3.3 rating/9 percent share among adults between the ages of 18 and 49. This means that it was seen by 3.3 percent of all 18- to 49-year-olds, and 9 percent of all 18- to 49-year-olds watching television at the time of the broadcast. This marked a decrease in viewers from the previous episode. The full film, which has a runtime of 25 minutes, is available on the seventh season DVD and Blu-ray, and was made available on iTunes on February 18, 2011.

I know there are still quite a few episodes to go before we say goodbye to Michael for good, but I almost wish this had been his swan song. Why not go out on a high note? I'm sure the writers have much more in store for him as the season winds down ... but this could have been the last episode of The Office I ever saw and it would leave me smiling and satisfied.

— Cindy White, IGN

IGN writer Cindy White awarded the episode a 9 out of 10—calling it "amazing"—and praised the self-awareness of Michael Scott and Steve Carell's performance. She ultimately said the episode was good enough to be Carell's last episode. Bonnie Stiernberg of Paste wrote that "there wasn’t a ton of action this week, but it was just enough to keep Michael’s personal growth on our radar as we continue to brace ourselves for his grand finale."

Dan Forcella of TV Fanatic awarded the episode five out of five stars, and called it one of "the best episodes in years". Forcella praised the "continuity and callbacks". He also noted that the tension between Michael and Holly was "easing the viewers towards the end of Carrell's [sic] stay at The Office". Alan Sepinwall wrote that, despite the episode being "goofy ... silly, and [and] about as nonsensical as the film itself", "Threat Level Midnight" was "a fun, sweet tour through the history of the Michael Scott era".

Myles McNutt of The A.V. Club awarded the episode a "B" and wrote that "there is no question that [it] is a fan service." He called it a "mixed bag"; on one hand, he noted that some of the scenes were clever, such as Darryl's opinion on portraying a black president before Obama was elected. On the other hand, he felt that Michael's "juvenile" response to Holly was uncharacteristic, and the "oddly high production values and camera work" were unrealistic for the show. He also felt the inclusion of some characters—such as Roy, Jan, or Karen—did not make sense in the context of the series. He concluded that while the episode had issues, "the actual content of Threat Level Midnight was successful in more ways than I had expected". Rick Porter of Zap2it gave the episode a mixed review, saying that it "had moments that were a huge amount of fun, both inside Michael's labor of love and in people's reaction to it. But it also felt a little bit clip-showy."

== In popular culture ==
In 2015, Welsh pop punk band Neck Deep released their second studio album, Life's Not Out To Get You, which contained the song "Threat Level Midnight". Likewise, Green Day side project The Network released a song titled "Threat Level Midnight" on their 2020 album. Green Day member Billie Joe Armstrong is a fan of The Office.

Various lines from the episode are sampled in the song "My Strange Addiction" by the American singer-songwriter Billie Eilish for her debut album When We All Fall Asleep, Where Do We Go? (2019).
