= Performance Review =

- The Office episode
- Episode no.: Season 2 Episode 8
- Directed by: Paul Feig
- Written by: Larry Wilmore
- Cinematography by: Randall Einhorn
- Editing by: Dean Holland
- Production code: 2009
- Original air date: November 15, 2005
- Running time: 22 minutes

Guest appearances
- Melora Hardin as Jan Levinson; Leslie David Baker as Stanley Hudson; Brian Baumgartner as Kevin Malone; Kate Flannery as Meredith Palmer; Mindy Kaling as Kelly Kapoor; Angela Kinsey as Angela Martin; Paul Lieberstein as Toby Flenderson; Oscar Nunez as Oscar Martinez; Phyllis Smith as Phyllis Lapin

Episode chronology
← Previous "The Client"	Next → "Email Surveillance"
- The Office (American TV series) season 2

"Performance Review" is the eighth episode of the second season of the American comedy television series The Office and the show's fourteenth episode overall. It was written by Larry Wilmore and directed by Paul Feig. It first aired on November 15, 2005, on NBC. The episode guest stars Melora Hardin as Jan Levinson.

The series depicts the everyday lives of office employees in the Scranton, Pennsylvania branch of the fictional Dunder Mifflin Paper Company. In this episode, Michael Scott (Steve Carell) conducts job performance reviews with his employees, and struggles to get Jan Levinson (Melora Hardin) to talk about their romantic relationship from the previous episode. Meanwhile, Dwight Schrute (Rainn Wilson) thinks that it is Friday, when it is in fact Thursday.

The episode was originally going to be about "weight loss" and be one of the early episodes of the second season. Several scenes were created due to onset accidents and ad-libbing, such as Dwight's fitness orb popping and Michael grabbing Jan's breast accidentally. "Performance Review" contained several pop culture references. It received mostly positive reviews from critics and earned a Nielsen rating of 3.9 in the 18–49 demographic, being viewed by 8 million viewers.

== Plot ==
Michael Scott is giving his annual performance reviews but, instead of evaluating the employees' job performances, he asks their opinions about a phone message from his own boss, Jan Levinson. Jan's message sternly tells Michael not to bring up their recent romantic encounter when she does his performance review, but feeling their workplace standing is on the line, the employees cater to Michael's desires by telling him the message shows Jan has feelings for him. During Michael's performance review, Jan insists he remain strictly professional and present his ideas for improving business. He plunders the employee suggestion box for ideas, but the suggestions – which Jan insists he read in front of her – mostly concern Michael's personal hygiene and include a directive to "Stop sleeping with your boss". As Jan storms out of the office, Michael continues demanding to know why she will not have a relationship with him. Jan finally breaks down and vents her feelings about Michael, both positive and negative, and says she is not ready for another relationship. Michael is satisfied by the rejection, since she implied he was worth having a relationship with.

From a tense exchange with Dwight Schrute, Jim Halpert realizes Dwight thinks it is Friday instead of Thursday. Pam Beesly and Jim reinforce this misconception with casual conversation. During his performance review, Dwight asks for a raise, claiming he has never missed a day of work, even breaking into the office to work on holidays. Dwight's calendar confusion continues into the following day, and so he fails to turn up for work that morning, leading Michael to comment skeptically on Dwight's claim of never missing a day of work.

== Production ==
=== Writing ===
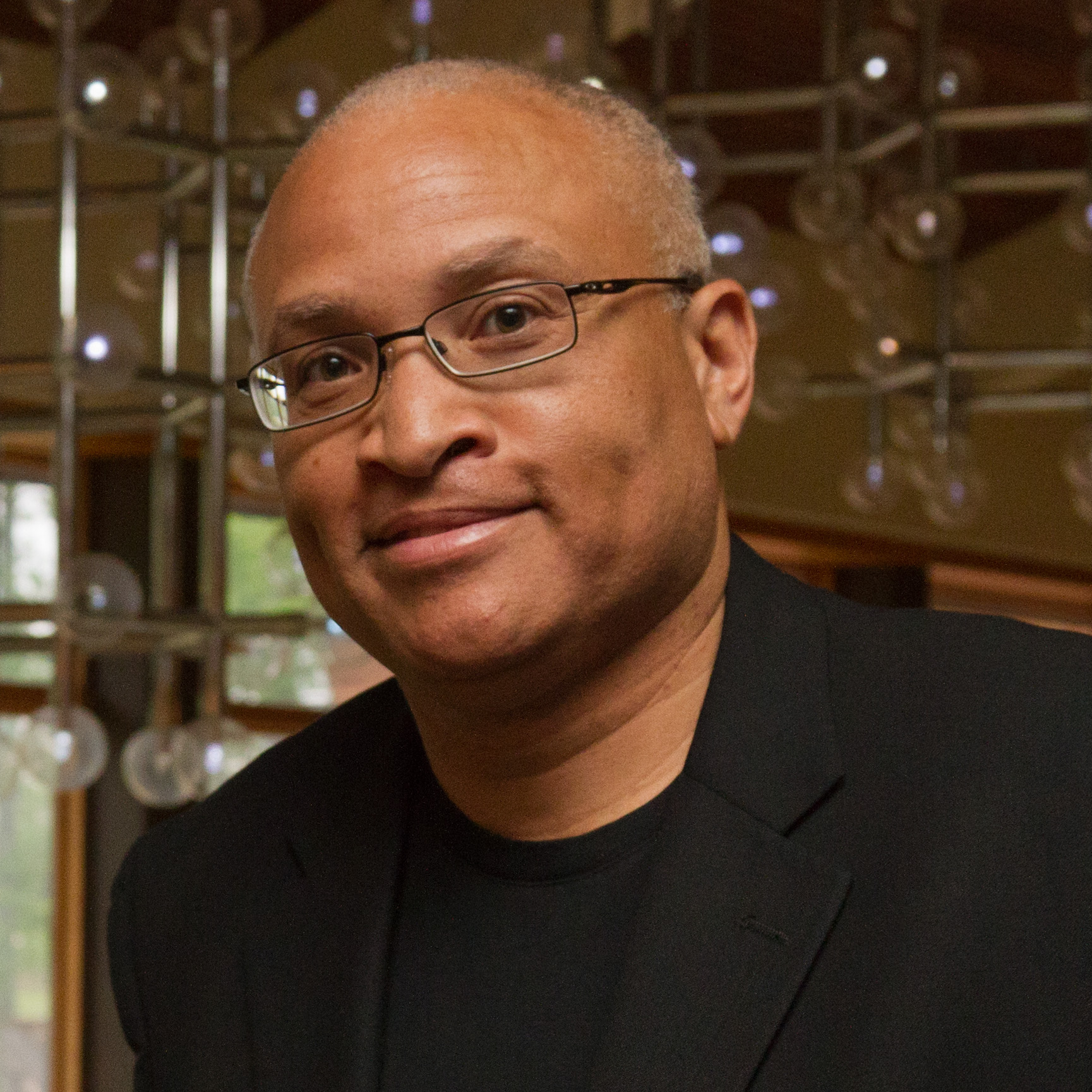
The episode was written by Larry Wilmore.

The episode was written by Larry Wilmore, making it his first and only writing contribution to the series. Wilmore had previously guest starred in the series as Mr. Brown, the diversity instructor who gives a presentation to the office in the first season episode "Diversity Day". The episode was originally going to be about "weight loss" and be one of the first episodes of the second season aired. However, after "The Dundies" and "The Fire", series creator and developer Greg Daniels decided to hold the episode off and combine it with elements of "The Client". When "Performance Review" was being formulated, Wilmore had "four different ideas that were scrunched together to make an episode". One of the ideas was on a card that said "Thursday Friday". After inquiring about the meaning, Wilmore loved the idea and noted that it "would be great" in the episode and a "real funny thing to pull on Dwight". Originally, the episode contained a subplot wherein Pam attempts to get a new chair approved by Michael. The scenes, in fact, were shot, but were never aired.

=== Filming ===
The episode was directed by Paul Feig, making it his third episode directed for The Office after "Office Olympics" and "Halloween". During the filming of the episode, Jenna Fischer came down with a cold. Instead of postponing, however, Fischer memorized and performed all her lines, resulting in fellow cast member Angela Kinsey calling her a "trooper".

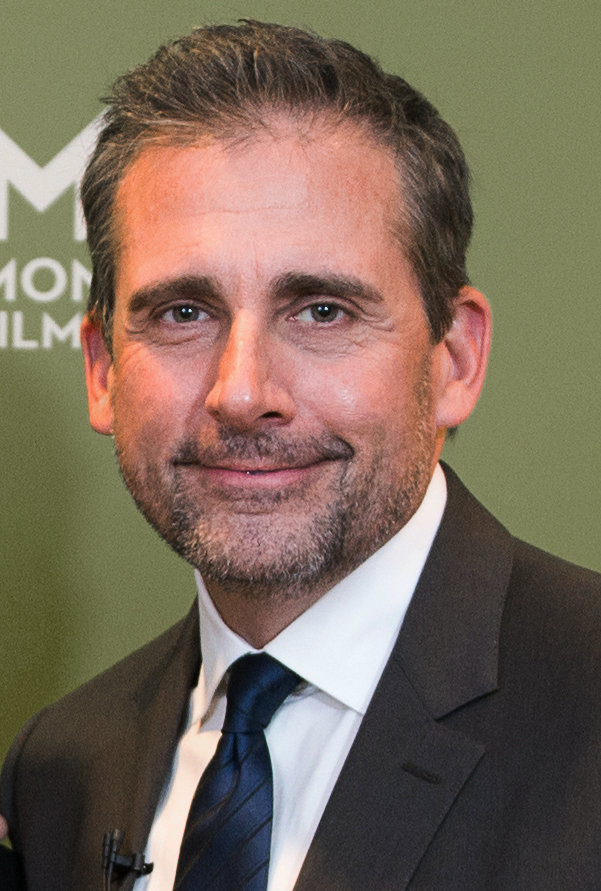
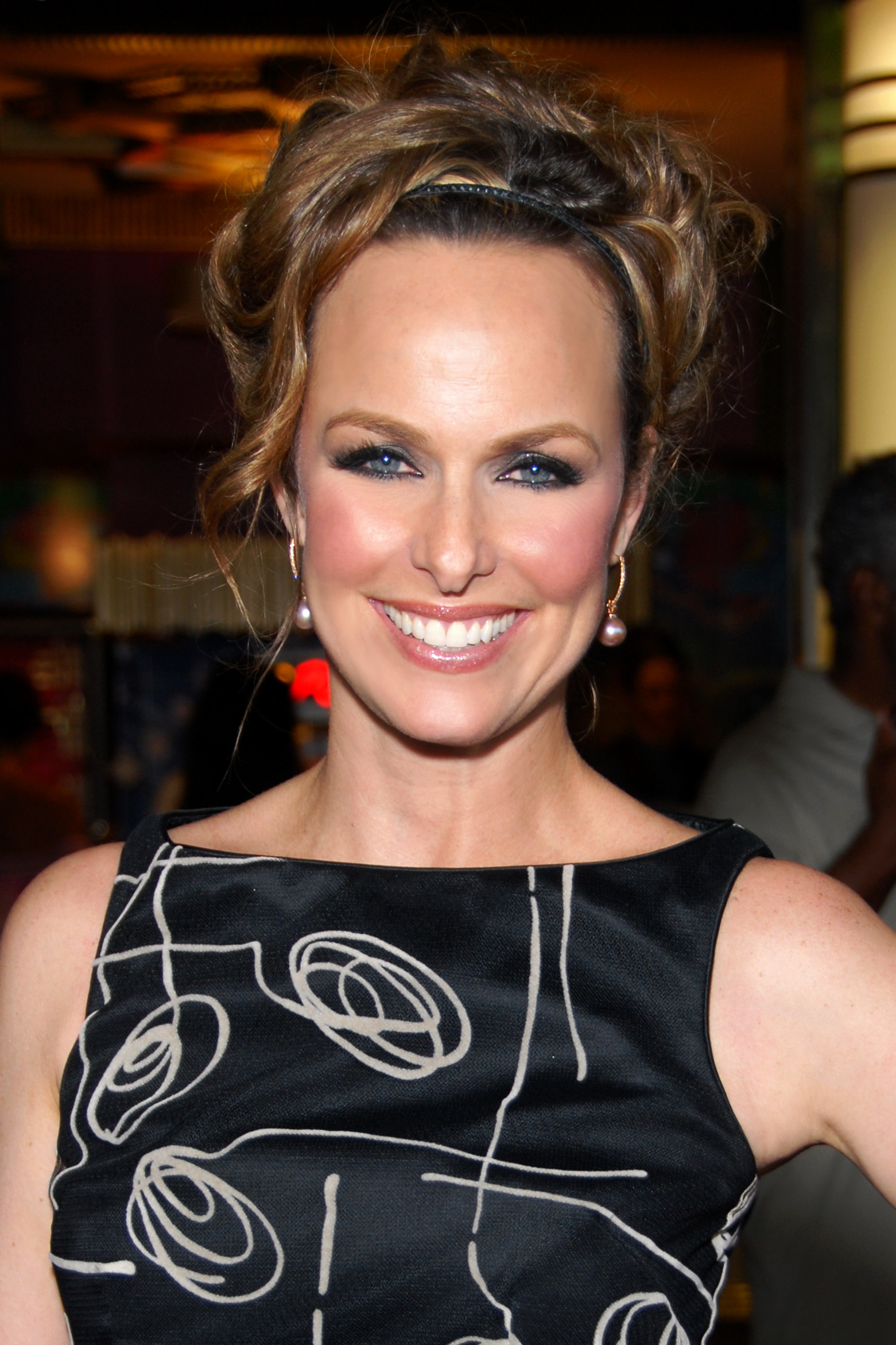
Steve Carell (left) and Melora Hardin (right) improvised many of their scenes.

Several scenes were created due to onset accidents and ad-libbing. In the cold opening, Dwight tries to impress Jim with his recently purchased "fitness orb". Initially dismissive, Jim pops the ball after Dwight becomes increasingly obnoxious and troublesome. Before filming, the scene had been successfully rehearsed "about ten times"; each time, when Krasinski punctured the plastic, the ball slowly deflated. However, when it came time to film the scene, Krasinski accidentally hit the ball "right on the seam", resulting in Wilson quickly—and dramatically—hitting the carpet. In fact, several of the cast members in the background can be seen laughing, due to the unexpected nature of the shot. Initially, the cut was relegated to the blooper reel, but Wilmore pleaded with Daniels to include it in the finished episode. The "accidental boob grab" scene was based on a mistake made by Carell during a rehearsal. Originally, he was supposed to pat Hardin's shoulder. Instead, however, he accidentally brushed past her breast. Hardin, finding the accident "hilarious", demanded that Carell do it during the actual shooting. Furthermore, several of the scenes were improvised beyond the initial lines given to Steve Carell and Melora Hardin, such as the ending wherein Michael and Jan have a discussion about Michael's flaws. Wilson recounts that he had to sit at his desk for "an hour and a half" due to the ad libbing.

During the suggestion box scene, Larry Wilmore envisioned Dwight as an Ed McMahon-type character, repeating everything Michael said. Paul Lieberstein claimed that figuring out the logistics for the conference room scene was "the heart" of the episode. Hardin recalled that it was extremely difficult to stay in character, due to the humorous nature of the dialogue and the cast members' reactions. In fact, the cast broke more than usual during filming. During the scene, Michael reads a suggestion from someone named Tom, who asks for better help for people with depression. After inquiring who this mysterious Tom is, Phyllis tells Michael that he worked in accounting until a year ago and committed suicide. Wilmore claimed during the DVD commentary for the episode that the writers would be mentioning him in the show's third season, in which his backstory would be explained, although this never panned out. However, during the Writer's Block Q&A session at The Office Convention in 2007, the writers, perhaps sardonically, suggested that Tom's death was the reason that Ryan was brought in as a temporary worker.

The Season Two DVD contains a number of deleted scenes from this episode. Notable cut scenes include Michael giving Oscar Martinez (Oscar Nunez) his performance review, Dwight giving Jim advice for his performance review, Jim confusing Michael by questioning him about his romantic encounter with Jan using increasingly obscure and convoluted baseball metaphors for sex, Michael calling Jan's ex-husband and her reaction, Michael describing the office with a confused metaphor involving organs of the body, and an entire subplot in which Ryan pursues a mysterious trail of notes starting in the suggestion box.

== Cultural references ==
To summarize why he deserves a raise, Dwight utilizes a Lex Luthor quote from the "Hothead" episode of Smallville. Writer Jason Kessler was tasked with searching on the internet in order to get the right line. Kinsey was pleased with the inclusion of the Smallville quote. In order to trick Dwight into thinking that Thursday was actually Friday, Pam and Jim discuss who Donald Trump fired on The Apprentice, which was in its fourth season at the time the episode aired. Before his review, Dwight pumps himself up by listening to glam metal band Mötley Crüe.

== Reception ==
"Performance Review" originally aired on NBC in the United States on November 15, 2005. The episode was viewed by 8 million viewers and received a 3.9 rating/9 percent share among adults between the ages of 18 and 49. This means that it was seen by 3.9 percent of all 18- to 49-year-olds, and 9 percent of all 18- to 49-year-olds watching television at the time of the broadcast. An encore presentation of the episode, on June 6, 2006, received 2.5 rating/7 percent share and was viewed by over 4.7 million viewers.

"Miss Alli" from Television Without Pity gave the episode an "A−" rating. Dan Phillips of IGN named "Dwight's First Day Late" as the tenth greatest prank on the show. He noted, "Seeing a disheveled, unshaven Dwight run desperately towards the office in hopes of saving his perfect performance record was enough to land this prank on the list despite its lack of complexity." Diane Holloway of the Austin American-Statesman wrote positively of the episode, and cited it as an example of how The Office, along with My Name Is Earl, has "restored the comedy hour to NBC". Michael Sciannamea of Huffpost TV wrote that he "liked the idea of having a continuation of a storyline" from "The Client", but that the subplot of Dwight mistaking a Thursday for a Friday "really didn't go anywhere". He also noted that "Dwight's behavior was over the top again", a fact which "can really be disconcerting". Matt Zoller Seitz of Salon named the entry the ninth best episode of the series, praising the comedic confrontation between Michael and Jan, as well as being a "strong Dwight episode". Furthermore, Seitz praised the cold opening, calling it "a classic Jim prank".

Erik Adams of The A.V. Club awarded the episode a "B", and wrote that the episode was "squarely invested in advancing the pieces on The Office's game board—all the while keeping its gaze fixed on the events of the previous episode". Adams felt that the A-story was largely dramatic, but was successfully balanced by the simplistic yet humorous B-story which "helps that A-story find its best beats". Ultimately, he felt that "the episode sets up a portion of the season where secrets and snooping become recurring components—fitting for a show grounded in the truth-telling conventions of documentary film."

Holloway highlighted Michael's review of Angela, wherein he tells her "You're adequate", as the best line in the episode. TV Fanatic reviewed several of the quotes for the episode. The site ranked Angela's monologue about how much she loves being judged, as well as Jim's revelation that Dwight thinks a Thursday is really a Friday, a four out of five. TV Fanatic awarded the conversation between Stanley and Michael—wherein Stanley tells Michael how to properly listen for subtext in a voicemail—as well as Dwight's frustration that he went out and got drunk with his laser tag team, a five out of five. Wilson later claimed that Dwight's line about laser tag caused "quite a buzz" online.
