= The Client (The Office) =

- The Office episode
- Episode no.: Season 2 Episode 7
- Directed by: Greg Daniels
- Written by: Paul Lieberstein
- Cinematography by: Randall Einhorn
- Editing by: David Rogers
- Production code: 2005
- Original air date: November 8, 2005
- Running time: 22 minutes

Guest appearances
- Tim Meadows as Christian; Melora Hardin as Jan Levinson; David Denman as Roy Anderson; Leslie David Baker as Stanley Hudson; Brian Baumgartner as Kevin Malone; Kate Flannery as Meredith Palmer; Mindy Kaling as Kelly Kapoor; Angela Kinsey as Angela Martin; Paul Lieberstein as Toby Flenderson; Oscar Nunez as Oscar Martinez; Phyllis Smith as Phyllis Lapin

Episode chronology
| ← Previous "The Fight" | Next → "Performance Review" |
- The Office (American TV series) season 2

"The Client" is the seventh episode of the second season of the American comedy television series The Office and the show's thirteenth episode overall. Written by Paul Lieberstein, who also acts in the show as Toby Flenderson, and directed by Greg Daniels, the episode first aired in the United States on November 8, 2005, on NBC.

The series depicts the everyday lives of office employees in the Scranton, Pennsylvania branch of the fictional Dunder Mifflin Paper Company. In this episode, Jan Levinson (Melora Hardin) and Michael Scott (Steve Carell) begin a relationship after landing an important client (Tim Meadows). Meanwhile, the rest of the office finds a screenplay written by Michael and they decide to read it together.

The idea for Jan and Michael to have a romantic relationship was conceived by Steve Carell as far back as the filming of the pilot episode. The kiss between the two was rehearsed and filmed "many, many, many times", according to B. J. Novak. While filming, Steve Carell and Tim Meadows improvised a good majority of their dinner scene, but most of it never made the final cut. During the production of the episode, the cast and crew were informed by NBC that the show would be picked up for a whole 22 episodes, a move that "surprised" them. The episode received mostly positive reviews from critics and earned a Nielsen rating of 3.8 in the 18–49 demographic, being viewed by 7.5 million viewers.

== Plot ==
Michael Scott and Jan Levinson meet with Christian, who is in charge of the county government's office paper contract. Taking him on as a client could mean the branch will not have to downsize, a threat that has been looming for the past year. Jan is not happy that Michael changed the meeting location from a hotel meeting room to Chili's without permission and persists in jokes and personal discussion instead of getting down to business. However, she discovers at the end of the day that there is a method to his madness, as the bonding between Michael and Christian allows him to close the deal. Afterwards, in the parking lot, Michael and the recently divorced Jan kiss and leave together.

During the meeting Michael calls Pam Beesly to read from one of the joke books in his desk, where she finds a screenplay written by Michael entitled Threat Level: Midnight, starring himself as "Agent Michael Scarn". The staff perform a read-through of the script, in which the character sequence "Dwigt" appears. They realize Michael based his incompetent sidekick on Dwight Schrute, but later changed the name with a search and replace, which did not affect the misspelling of Dwight's name. Dwight is upset and shuts down the exercise to invite everyone to set off fireworks outside, but only Kevin Malone follows.

When the staff discuss their worst first dates, Pam astounds them with a story of how her date forgot about her and left her behind at a minor league hockey game. Their astonishment increases when they realize the date was her now-fiancé, Roy. Jim Halpert and Pam break off their respective evening plans to enjoy an impromptu dinner on the roof and watch Dwight and Kevin fool around with fireworks. The next day Jim half-jokingly remarks to Pam that this was their first date. When Pam replies bluntly that it was not a date, Jim is caught by surprise and makes a snide comment about the hockey game date. Hurt, Pam breaks off the conversation.

The following morning, Dwight, having spent the night in the office, sees Jan coming by to retrieve her car, igniting gossip that she had sex with Michael. Michael reveals to the documentary crew that they made out and talked long into the night before falling asleep. Jan calls and says she regrets what happened, even accusing Michael of deliberately getting her drunk to initiate a romantic encounter with her, but Michael refuses to accept her change of heart. He and Jim share a moment of confusion at their love interests.

== Production ==
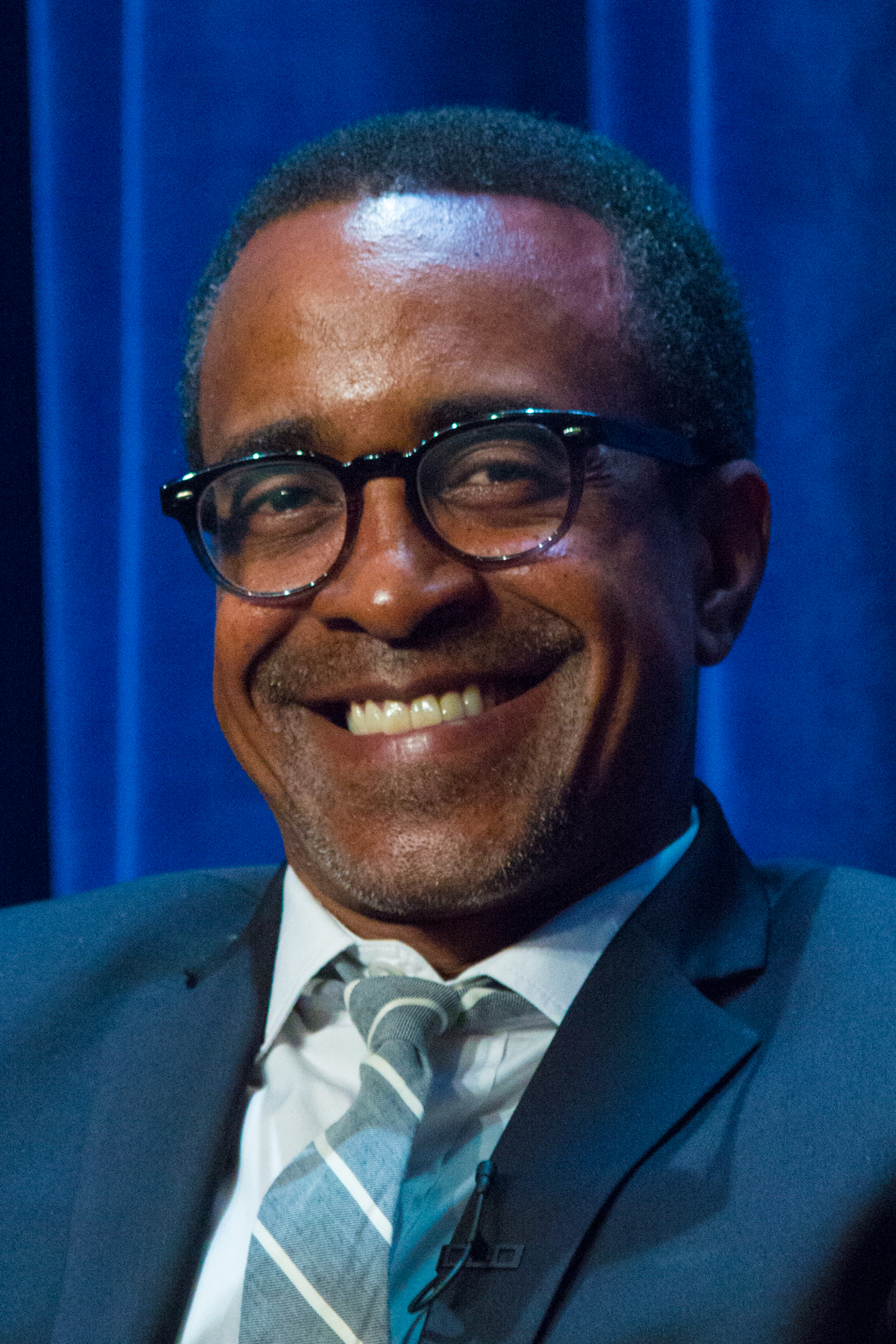
Actor and comedian Tim Meadows guest starred in the episode as the titular client.

This episode was the third episode of the series directed by Greg Daniels. Daniels had previously directed the episodes "Basketball" and "The Dundies". "The Client" was written by Paul Lieberstein, who acts on the show as human resources director Toby Flenderson. The idea for Jan and Michael to have a romantic relationship was conceived by Steve Carell as far back as the filming of the pilot episode. According to writer and producer Greg Daniels "it was like he (Michael) was turned on by his teacher." Lieberstein said that the first idea that anybody came up for the episode was the final shot, where Jim and Michael look at each other and shake their heads, suggesting that they had been through similar experiences. The rest of the episode was written to lead to that scene. The scene where Oscar tells a story about a date getting a background check on him was based on an actual date that Paul Lieberstein went on.

While filming, Steve Carell and Tim Meadows improvised a lot of their dinner scene, but most of it never made the final cut. One improvised scene that did make the final cut was the "Baby Back Ribs" song. In an interview, Jenna Fischer said that the rooftop scene was her favorite to shoot. Fischer recalled that "there was a very small crew up on the roof and they had the cameras really far away." For the scene where the characters do a read-through of "Threat Level Midnight", in an inverse of the typical television filming process, the cast members held scripts on-camera but improvised most of their dialogue. After the main shooting ended, producers decided to do a re-shoot to explain the "Dwigt" situation clearly and concisely. The kiss between Michael and Jan was rehearsed and filmed "many, many, many times", according to B. J. Novak. While editing the kiss between Michael and Jan, Greg Daniels brought many people into the editing room to see if they thought the kiss was too long or not long enough.

Among the scenes deleted from the episode before broadcast was a talking head interview in which Jim says that his worst first date was when he went out to lunch with Pam under the mistaken impression that they were on a date and learned that she was engaged; Daniels said this was his favorite scene of season two.

During the production of the episode, the cast and crew were informed by NBC that the show would be picked up for a whole 22 episodes. Initially, the show's second season had only been brought back for six episodes, to test the water. Despite the lackluster reception the first season had, ratings jumped during the second season to 7.7 million in the fall alone. After the ratings success, Kevin Reilly, NBC Entertainment president, "surprised" the cast and crew of the staff and ordered a full season; he later likened the series to Seinfeld and Cheers, noting that they too had "slow starts".

== Cultural references ==
Michael tells Jan that he moved their meeting from a Radisson to a Chili's, per advice—that he sent in—to the magazine Small Businessman. During their meeting, Michael tells Christian and Jan the Lighthouse and naval vessel joke. Dwight reveals to the camera that he was once in a production of Oklahoma!, and played the part of "Mutie The Mailman". He explains that the production had too many kids, so they made up extra roles.

Michael's screenplay is a parody of secret agent films, most notably the James Bond franchise. In Michael's screenplay, his love interest is named Catherine Zeta-Jones. The name of Michael's movie has been referenced several other times through the series. In the third season episode "Product Recall", Michael frantically states that, due to the amount of angry customers, the office has been "put at Threat Level Midnight." Michael's screenplay is eventually turned into a home movie, which is viewed by the entire office in the seventh season episode "Threat Level Midnight."

== Reception ==
"The Client" originally aired on NBC in the United States on November 8, 2005. The episode was viewed by 7.5 million viewers and received a 3.8 rating/9% share among adults between the ages of 18 and 49. This means that it was seen by 3.8% of all 18- to 49-year-olds, and 9% of all 18- to 49-year-olds watching television at the time of the broadcast. The episode retained 73 percent of its lead-in My Name Is Earl audience, the best the show had done up until that point. An encore presentation of the episode, on April 25, 2006, received 2.4 rating/7% share was viewed by over 4.8 million viewers.

The episode received mostly positive reviews from television critics. TV Squad's Michael Sciannamea gave the episode a largely positive review wrote that Michael is "totally taken with himself", but still "has shown us his vulnerabilities". Sciannamea noted that, by showing the audience Michael's humanity, the writers were making "this sitcom so compelling". Sciannamea, however, did point out that this is the second week in a row that "Pam is offended by something Jim has said or done", which in his mind "will get tiresome quickly if it continues". "Miss Alli" of Television Without Pity graded the episode with a "B+". Rolling Stone named the scene wherein the employees read Threat Level: Midnight as the tenth funniest in The Office's first three seasons.

Erik Adams of The A.V. Club awarded the episode an "A" and called it "a series-best episode of The Office whose series-best status sneaks up on you". He was largely complimentary towards the way the episode built towards a climax, and followed various successful "setup-punchline rhythms". He also applauded the introduction of the Threat Level: Midnight screenplay, calling it "a subplot so crucial to the mythology of the series, it would form the basis of an entire episode near the end of Steve Carell's time in Scranton." Adams ultimately concluded that the episode is "a top-notch Office installment overall", thanks in large part to the Pam–Jim and Michael–Jan subplots and dynamics.
