= Women's Appreciation =

- The Office episode
- Dwight and the "pervert". The prank received positive reviews from critics.
- Episode no.: Season 3 Episode 22
- Directed by: Tucker Gates
- Written by: Gene Stupnitsky; Lee Eisenberg
- Cinematography by: Randall Einhorn
- Editing by: Dean Holland
- Production code: 321
- Original air date: May 3, 2007
- Running time: 29 minutes

Guest appearances
- Creed Bratton as Creed Bratton; Rashida Jones as Karen Filippelli

Episode chronology
← Previous "Product Recall"	Next → "Beach Games"
- The Office (American season 3)

"Women's Appreciation" is the twenty-second episode of the third season of the American version of The Office, the show's fiftieth overall, and the third supersized episode of the season. In this episode, Phyllis is flashed in the parking lot, so Michael takes all the women to the mall for "women's appreciation", where the status of his relationship with Jan comes to light. Meanwhile, Pam makes a sketch supposedly of the man who flashed Phyllis, when it in fact resembles Dwight, who is unaware and posts the fliers throughout town.

The episode was written by Gene Stupnitsky and Lee Eisenberg and directed by Tucker Gates. The characters travel to Mall at Steamtown, a shopping center in Scranton, Pennsylvania. Cast members Jenna Fischer and Kate Flannery enjoyed the three-day shoot outside the office, and the latter was able to perform her own driving stunts. While filming, the cast were often met with fans "in full force" yelling out Steve Carell's name and taking pictures. Retailer Victoria's Secret agreed to close their mall store to the public to allow for episode filming.

"Women's Appreciation" first aired in the United States on May 3, 2007. It garnered an estimated 7.0 million viewers, causing it to rank fourth in its timeslot. Television critics gave positive reviews to the episode. Comedic elements, such as Pam's prank on Dwight, were praised, and many critics found Michael's antics humorous, but one reviewer felt that Michael's relationship problems with Jan came out of nowhere.

== Plot ==
Phyllis Vance enters the office and says she was flashed in the parking lot, prompting Dwight Schrute to open an investigation. He orders Pam Beesly to interview Phyllis and make a sketch of the flasher. However, Phyllis says she did not get a good look at him, so Pam instead draws a picture of Dwight with a mustache and without glasses. Andy Bernard (who seems to notice that the sketch looks similar to Dwight) assists an oblivious Dwight in posting fliers with Pam's sketch on it around town.

Michael Scott initially makes light of the exposure incident. After being shamed by how offended the other employees are by his antics, he attempts to reassert his sensitivity to women by holding a seminar on women's issues. He closes the meeting by offering to take the women to the Mall at Steamtown. Before leaving, he receives a call from Jan Levinson, who asks to meet with him to have sex. Michael balks at the proposal, and becomes more uncomfortable when she offers to pay him for the sex.

At the mall, Michael opens up to the women about his discomfort with Jan. Among other things, he tells them Jan has been videotaping them having sex and watching it with him afterwards. All the women assure Michael that Jan's behavior is not normal and urge him to get out of the relationship. He remains conflicted, but at Phyllis's prompting he finally admits to himself that he wants to break up with her. Michael thanks them for their help by treating them to one item each at Victoria's Secret. On the drive back, Pam takes a step toward asserting herself by changing a flat tire on Meredith Palmer's car. At the office, Kevin Malone sneaks into the women's bathroom and discovers a plush waiting room. The other men join him.

Upon returning to the office, Michael calls Jan and ends their relationship by leaving a voicemail message when she fails to answer. As he is doing this, Jan walks into his office to apologize in person for their earlier conversation, but when she receives Michael's voicemail, she walks out in silence. Jim Halpert informs Dwight he saw the flasher in the women's bathroom "above the sink". Dwight dashes to the bathroom and examines the mirror where someone has etched a mustache similar to the sketch's. Dwight realizes the prank and curses Pam.

== Production ==
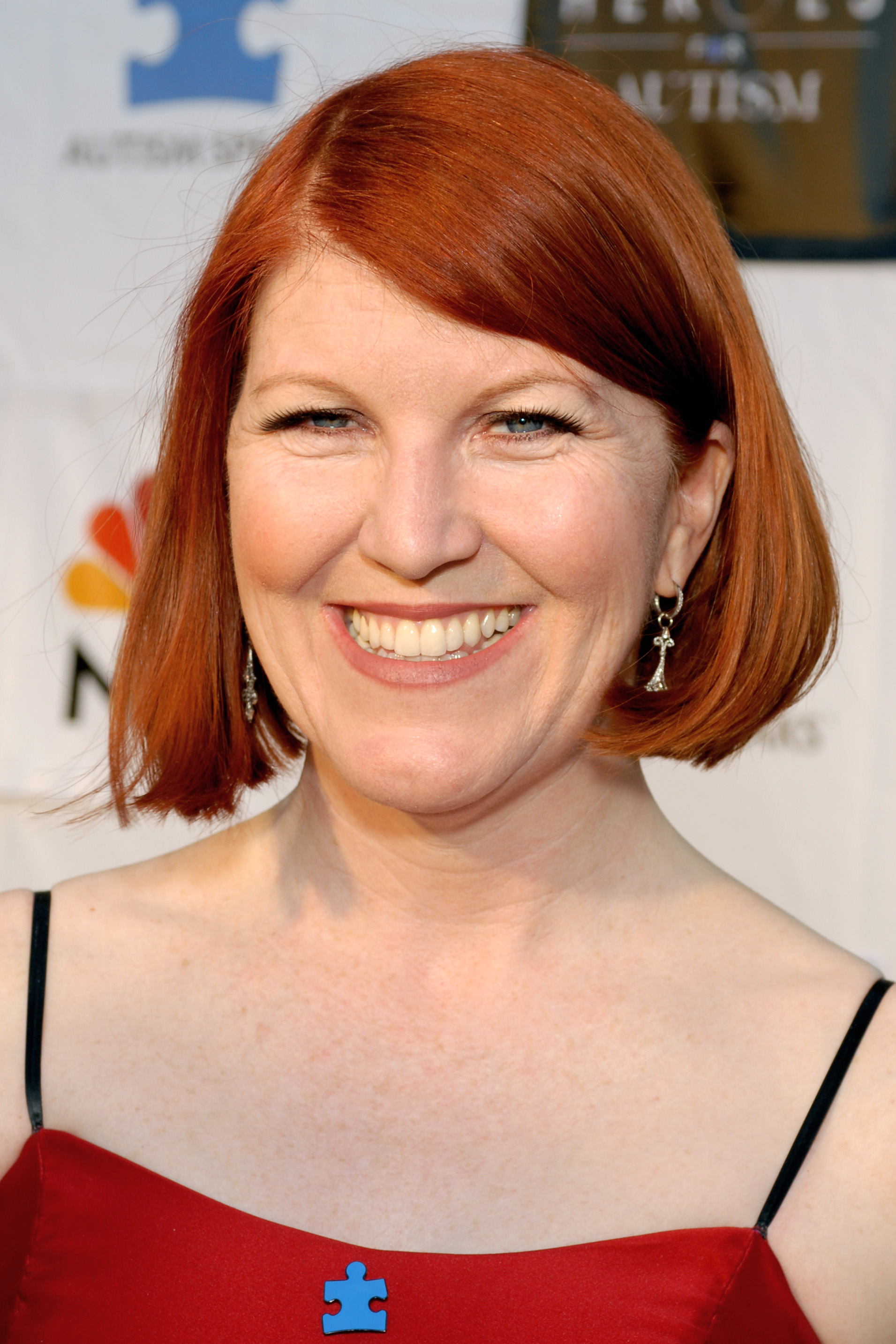
Kate Flannery performed her own driving stunts for the episode.

"Women's Appreciation" was written by Gene Stupnitsky and Lee Eisenberg, while Tucker Gates served as the episode's director. The cold open featuring Jim receiving a demerit from Dwight was initially intended for "Business School", and the opening of "Product Recall", which featured Jim and Dwight impersonating each other, was first intended for this episode before it was moved because of time constraints. Michael and Jan's safeword "foliage" was a placeholder until the writers could come up with a funnier safeword, but was left in the episode because the writers forgot about it. While the characters travel to Mall at Steamtown, a shopping center in Scranton, Pennsylvania, episode filming actually took place near Los Angeles, where the series is normally shot.

Kate Flannery, who plays Meredith, called the episode one of her favorites to shoot because she "was stuck in a van with Mindy Kaling, Jenna Fischer, Angela Kinsey, Rashida Jones, Phyllis Smith and Steve Carell for two days". Fischer agreed, calling it a "fun episode to shoot" due to having three days of filming with Carell and The Office women. However, she was uncomfortable doing the talking head scene where Pam fantasizes about Jim flashing her, finding that pretending to be Pam imagining Jim's penis was too much like imagining actor John Krasinski's penis. Believing Meredith's minivan was "another character" in the series, Flannery enjoyed being able to drive and act simultaneously. In a reflection of the character's personality, the production crew added props such as bottles of alcohol, chips, crushed soda cans, garbage, and 14 air fresheners to the vehicle. The cast however became sick from the odor, leading to the air fresheners' removal. The crew were unable to get a single take of Flannery upending the bag of chips into her mouth without Fischer breaking into laughter, so they had to composite separately filmed footage of Flannery and Fischer using split screen. Flannery was able to perform her own stunts for the episode, explaining that she "was nervous at first, but I think I really could be a demolition-derby star".

The cast enjoyed shooting at the mall, but were faced with fans "in full force". Crowds followed them while shooting, holding up camera phones and yelling Carell's name. Flannery said of the episode, "We shot some really fun stuff with Steve and the ladies just running around the mall. The food-court scene was so much fun. Steve is an amazing actor." Lingerie retailer Victoria's Secret agreed to close their store to the public for filming. In the episode, Angela reveals that she wears large sizes of clothes purchased from American Girl, a doll store chain, but will not shop at children's retailer Gap Kids because it is "too flashy." In the DVD audio commentary, Kinsey remarked that after the episode broadcast, people would bring up American Girl Doll catalogs for her to sign. Passersby also yelled out Carell's name during the scene where Pam changes a tire.

The Season Three DVD contains a number of deleted scenes. Notable cut scenes include Kelly learning that Phyllis got flashed, Bob Vance calming down Phyllis, Andy trying to earn back Dwight's favor by bonding over cold soups, Michael imagining himself as a woman, Dwight escorting the women to Meredith's car, Michael choosing lingerie for Pam, and an alternate version of Michael's concluding talking head.

== Reception ==
The episode first broadcast in the United States on May 3, 2007, on NBC in a special timeslot, airing behind an episode of My Name Is Earl. "Women's Appreciation" was a "supersized" episode, as it aired for forty minutes. It attracted an estimated 7.0 million viewers, and ranked fourth in its timeslot, behind episodes of Survivor: Fiji, Ugly Betty, and Are You Smarter Than a 5th Grader?.

The episode received positive reviews from television critics. IGN writer Brian Zoromski called "Women's Appreciation" a "fairly solid episode worthy of the super-sized treatment," and rated it 7.9 out of 10. He highlighted Pam's prank as well as Michael's attempt to break up with Jan via voicemail, calling the latter "easily the funniest moment in the episode, and perfectly played by both Steve Carell and Melora Hardin." Zoromski did however criticize the series for abandoning plot points, such as the publicity fiasco from the previous episode. Give Me My Remote's Kath Skerry called it a "hilarious episode," and observed "I don’t think The Office has ever pushed the envelope in terms of sexual discussion as much as it did tonight."

Jay Black from AOL TV disliked the episode's awkward moments and thought Michael's unhappiness with Jan came out of nowhere. Black did however praise Pam's prank as well as Dwight himself, but concluded his review: "A surprisingly weak handling of character combined with fewer laugh-out-loud moments than I'm used to forces me to give this episode 4 Creed number-twos out of 7." Entertainment Weekly staff writer Abby West also critiqued "Women's Appreciation", explaining that it "felt exactly like a 30-minute episode stretched to fill 43 minutes". She thought the episode "only came together" once the Office women performed an intervention for Michael.
