= Sex Ed (The Office) =

- The Office episode
- Episode no.: Season 7 Episode 4
- Directed by: Paul Lieberstein
- Written by: Paul Lieberstein
- Cinematography by: Matt Sohn
- Editing by: Claire Scanlon
- Production code: 7004
- Original air date: October 14, 2010
- Running time: 22 minutes

Guest appearances
- Melora Hardin as Jan Levinson; Linda Purl as Helene Beesly; Nancy Carell as Carol Stills; Amy Pietz as Donna Newton (voice)

Episode chronology
← Previous "Andy's Play"	Next → "The Sting"
- The Office (American season 7)

"Sex Ed" is the fourth episode of the seventh season of the American comedy television series The Office, and the show's 130th episode overall. Written and directed by Paul Lieberstein, the episode aired on NBC in the United States on October 14, 2010. The episode features the return of several recurring characters, most notably Melora Hardin as Jan Levinson, Linda Purl as Helene Beesly, and Nancy Carell as Carol Stills. Actresses Amy Pietz and Amy Ryan — who portray Donna Newton and Holly Flax — only make vocal cameos, though Ryan is credited as a starring role.

The series—presented as if it were a real documentary—depicts the everyday lives of office employees in the Scranton, Pennsylvania, branch of the fictional Dunder Mifflin Paper Company. In the episode, Michael Scott (Steve Carell) comes to work thinking he has a pimple, but it turns out to actually be a cold sore. When he is told that it is a form of herpes, Michael contacts all his ex-girlfriends—Jan, Holly, Helene, Donna, and Carol. Andy Bernard (Ed Helms) holds a sex education meeting in the office hoping to learn if Erin Hannon (Ellie Kemper) is having sex with her boyfriend, Gabe Lewis (Zach Woods).

Along with several actresses reprising their characters, "Sex Ed" also saw the introduction of warehouse worker Nate Nickerson, played by Mark Proksch; he would go on to recur for the remainder of the series. "Sex Ed" was viewed by 7.36 million viewers and received a 3.8 rating among adults between the ages of 18 and 49, marking a slight increase in the ratings when compared to the previous week. The episode was also the highest-ranked NBC series of the night, but it received mixed reviews from critics, many of whom felt that Michael was characterized as too stupid and that Andy's subplot was not compelling.

== Synopsis ==
Michael Scott arrives to the office with a fake mustache to hide what he thinks is a pimple over his mouth. Michael soon learns that it is a cold sore, which is a form of herpes. With some prodding from Dwight Schrute, Michael decides to tell his former lovers he has herpes, despite not yet having gone to a doctor. He calls Donna first, abruptly telling her to get tested. Michael then calls Holly Flax, joking around with her before they have a more serious discussion. Much to Michael's dismay, she claims that he over-romanticized their relationship, and he hangs up without telling her about the herpes. Michael and Dwight drive out to tell Carol Stills, Jan Levinson, and Pam's mother, Helene Beesly.

Michael and Dwight meet with Jan, who is now a fairly successful office manager for a hospital and single mother. After Jan gives Michael a brutal description of why their relationship failed and he watches her play with her daughter Astrid, Michael reveals that he has herpes. He meets with Helene, Pam's mother, who is playing with Cece at a playground; after an awkward conversation in which she also points out his skewed memory, he insults her and walks off. He meets with Carol while she is conducting an open house. Carol attempts to be polite, but then abruptly points out his faults too. Finally, Michael calls Holly one last time, only to get her voicemail. He leaves her a heartfelt message that what she said hurt him and that when he saw all his other exes, he had not been happy to see any of them, but when he talked to her, he was happy. He says that he does not understand why she wants to downplay what they had, but he remembers their relationship perfectly and considers it special. Before hanging up, he awkwardly adds that she should be tested for herpes.

Andy Bernard uses the situation to host a sex education class, with the ulterior motive to learn if his former girlfriend Erin Hannon has been having sex with her current boyfriend Gabe Lewis. During the lesson, he disturbs the office with pictures of genitalia, cannot come up with any negatives to sex besides STD's, and attempts to use a pencil for a condom demonstration. Distraught after realizing that they are having sex and after everyone mocks him, Andy throws a tantrum, hurling a box of pizza at the wall and storming out of the conference room. Gabe takes Andy to his cubicle and admonishes him for his behavior, revealing he is aware why Andy hosted the sex ed class. He explains to Andy that the only reason he asked Erin out was because Andy gave his blessing, which Andy reveals was just a result of his difficulty saying no to how politely Gabe asked him. Gabe tells Andy that he is going to let this whole situation slide this time and advises Andy to put Erin behind him. Andy is cheered up when he receives a generic pep talk from Darryl Philbin, despite Darryl having no idea what his problem is.

== Production ==
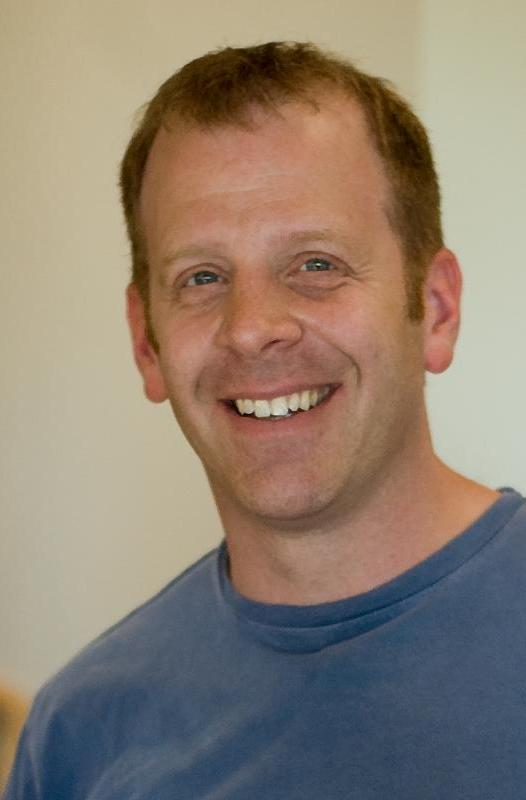
The Office actor and executive producer Paul Lieberstein wrote and directed "Sex Ed".

"Sex Ed" was written and directed by showrunner and executive producer Paul Lieberstein, who also plays Toby Flenderson on the show. The episode features several return appearances of former recurring characters. Amy Ryan appears in a voice-only role as Holly Flax, who was last seen in the fifth season finale, "Company Picnic". Melora Hardin appears as Jan Levinson, who was last seen in the fifth season episode, "Baby Shower". Amy Pietz appears as Donna, also in a voice-only role; she had a recurring role near the end of the sixth season. Linda Purl appears as Helene Beesly, who had a recurring role in the sixth season. Nancy Carell, the actual wife of Steve Carell, appears as Carol Stills, who was last seen in the third season episode, "A Benihana Christmas". Ryan would return later in the season as a way to provide Carell an exit from the series. Hardin would make a cameo appearance in the later season seven episode "Threat Level Midnight", as well as two appearances in the ninth season episodes "The Whale" and "Couples Discount". "Sex Ed" is the first episode to feature Dwight's assistant Nate, played by YouTube star Mark Proksch. After the producers of The Office saw a series of prank videos that Proksch did under the name "Kenny Strasser", they hired him to become a recurring character.

The official website of The Office included one deleted scene from "Sex Ed". In the clip, Kelly asks Jim how she should deal with Ryan not completely loving her. The Season Seven DVD contains a number of deleted scenes from this episode. The cut scenes include Dwight looking up how herpes is spread, Dwight discussing how Holly brings out "a child-like wonder in Michael", Michael contacting the French-Canadian concierge he had a brief relationship with in the fifth-season episode "Business Trip", and more cut scenes from Andy's sex ed discussion. In addition, an entire subplot was deleted from the episode. This story involved the camera crew catching Pam and Jim in the middle of a fight; the crew then tries to determine what caused them to fight in the first place.

== Cultural references ==
Michael compares himself to Canadian pop punk musician Avril Lavigne, noting that both of them get pimples. Andy sings a parody of Foreigner's 1978 hit single "Hot Blooded" about pizza. Jan mentions that she released "an album of Doris Day covers on [her] own label".

== Reception ==
"Sex Ed" first aired on NBC on October 14, 2010. In its original American broadcast it was viewed by an estimated 7.36 million viewers and received a 3.8 rating/10 percent share among adults between the ages of 18 and 49. This means that 3.8 percent of all 18- to 49-year-old households watched the episode, and ten percent of that demographic had their televisions tuned to the channel at any point. This marked a slight increase in viewers from the previous episode.

Jonathan Teigland of Starpulse called the episode "simple and silly". He applauded the final scene with Holly, writing that it was the "best" of Michael's reconnection with his ex-girlfriends. Dan Forcella of TV Fanatic awarded the episode three out of five stars, calling it "a miss". He felt that none of the encounters with Michael's former girlfriends were "funny", and that "the meetings themselves left a lot to be desired". He was also critical of Andy's subplot, writing that "very little about the execution worked". Forcella did, however, call Michael's conversation with Holly "classic".

Myles McNutt of The A.V. Club gave the episode a "C+" and felt that Michael's antics—largely the fact that he easily believes he has herpes—were too stupid to be believable; however, he felt that the episode's main story largely worked as planned. However, McNutt panned the episode's secondary story focusing on Andy, noting that it "lazily tapped into the series' basic structure". He ultimately concluded that "without any particularly strong jokes, it fell entirely on Andy's character, and there just wasn't enough there to support it". Alan Sepinwall of HitFix wrote that, while Michael's story "had its moments", it was largely "creepy and uncomfortable". He also criticized Andy's characterization, noting that, in the episode, he was written extremely similar to Michael.

== Cultural impact ==
The episode served as inspiration for the Brazilian web series Viral.
