= Email Surveillance =

- The Office episode
- Episode no.: Season 2 Episode 9
- Directed by: Paul Feig
- Written by: Jennifer Celotta
- Cinematography by: Randall Einhorn
- Editing by: David Rogers
- Production code: 2008
- Original air date: November 22, 2005
- Running time: 22 minutes

Guest appearances
- Leslie David Baker as Stanley Hudson; Brian Baumgartner as Kevin Malone; Kate Flannery as Meredith Palmer; Mindy Kaling as Kelly Kapoor; Angela Kinsey as Angela Martin; Paul Lieberstein as Toby Flenderson; Oscar Nunez as Oscar Martinez; Phyllis Smith as Phyllis Lapin; Ken Jeong as Bill; Michael Naughton as Chris

Episode chronology
← Previous "Performance Review"	Next → "Christmas Party"
- The Office (American TV series) season 2

"Email Surveillance" is the ninth episode of the second season of the American comedy television series The Office and the show's fifteenth episode overall. Written by Jennifer Celotta, and directed by Paul Feig, the episode first aired in the United States on November 22, 2005, on NBC. The episode guest starred Ken Jeong and Omi Vaidya.

The series depicts the everyday lives of office employees in the Scranton, Pennsylvania branch of the fictional Dunder Mifflin Paper Company. In the episode, the company tech support employee gives Michael Scott (Steve Carell) the ability to read his employees' emails, causing him to find out that Jim Halpert (John Krasinski) is throwing a party that Michael was not invited to. Meanwhile, Pam Beesly (Jenna Fischer) begins to suspect that Dwight Schrute (Rainn Wilson) and Angela Martin (Angela Kinsey) might secretly be having a relationship.

Ken Jeong explained that, while all the scenes were scripted, the actors were allowed to improvise their lines during the improv shots. Omi Vaidya revealed that, during the party scenes, the cast were allowed to drink real beer and play video games on an Xbox 360. "Email Surveillance" received largely positive reviews from television critics. The episode earned a Nielsen rating of 3.9 in the 18–49 demographic and was viewed by 8.3 million viewers in its original broadcast.

== Plot ==
Dunder Mifflin's tech support employee, Sadiq, arrives at the Scranton branch. Michael Scott panics, assuming that Sadiq is a terrorist due to his wearing a turban. Sadiq sets up a system that allows Michael to monitor his employees' emails. When everyone in the office finds out, Jim Halpert worries that Michael will discover the party he is throwing that night, to which Michael is not invited. Michael finds an e-mail about it and tries to get Jim to admit that he is having a party, while Jim acts nonchalantly as if nothing is happening. In order to keep Dwight Schrute from exposing the party, Jim tells him that it is a surprise party for Michael.

Pam Beesly overhears Dwight warning Angela Martin to delete any sensitive emails to avoid Michael reading them, leading her to suspect that Dwight and Angela are in an undisclosed office romance. However, she discreetly abandons her suspicions when she asks Phyllis Lapin if she noticed any office romances and Phyllis guesses that Pam meant her and Jim. Jim and Pam bond when she sees Jim's room for the first time and looks through his high school yearbook.

After ruining an improv class, Michael is uninvited to the class's after party. He decides to crash Jim's party, much to the staff's dismay and Dwight's naïve delight. Michael awkwardly tries his hand at karaoke but Jim then joins in, easing the tension considerably. The documentary crew catches Angela and Dwight making out in Jim's backyard.

== Production ==
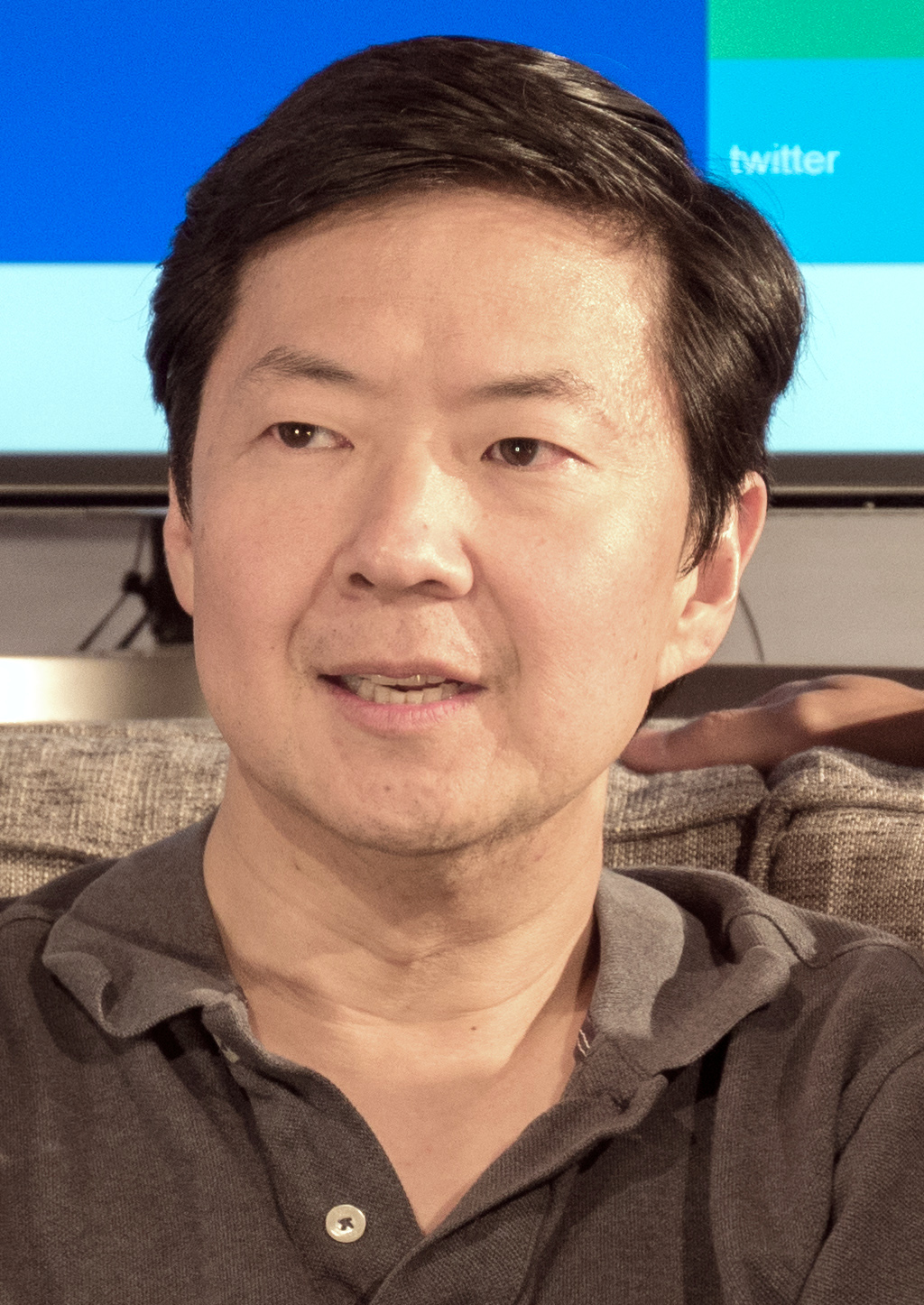
The episode co-stars Ken Jeong.

"Email Surveillance" was written by Jennifer Celotta, making it her first writing contribution to the series. This episode was the fourth episode of the series directed by Paul Feig. Feig had previously directed the episodes "Office Olympics", "Halloween", and "Performance Review".

When filming the scene with Michael in the improv class, Ken Jeong, who played Bill, said that "they (the crew) would shoot the scenes as scripted the first few takes, and then we would improvise after that." For example, "the scene where I (Ken Jeong) say 'Good job' to Michael and he says 'Nice job, Bill... not' was improvised." Jeong, who had previously taken part in an actual improv class, noted that "Anyone who's ever taken an improv class appreciates that bit [with Michael starting every session with a gun]."

The episode guest starred Omi Vaidya, who played the part of Sadiq, the IT assistant. Vaidya later explained that, originally, "a lot of people auditioned for that role, bigger Indian American actors". However Vaidya, who had watched the British version and was familiar with the camera style, "took a scarf, created a turban out of it and walked to the audition room with it on" because he thought that "that was what was needed for the character and the show". He later called his guest appearance "one of the best productions in the United States that I have been a part of". Vaidya said that he enjoyed shooting the party scenes the most because they got to drink real beer (rather than a stand-in liquid) and play video games on the then-unreleased Xbox 360 gaming console. Vaidya said that "it was like being at a real party with everyone from The Office except that we had to shoot a few scenes while we were chatting and relaxing."

== Cultural references ==
After Oscar confronts Michael about reading the staff's emails, Michael references Big Brother, from the novel Nineteen Eighty-Four and does an impression of The Tin Man from the 1939 film The Wizard of Oz. Michael invites Dwight over to his house to watch the 2004 version of Battlestar Galactica, but he misidentifies the show as "Battleship Galaxy". At his improv class, Michael, in an attempt to get the instructor's attention, asks "Mr. Kot-ter", a reference to the 1975 series Welcome Back, Kotter. During Jim's party, Phyllis sings a karaoke version of the 1987 hit "Here I Go Again" by hard rock band Whitesnake, and Kevin sings Cake's 1996 cover of "I Will Survive", originally by Gloria Gaynor. Finally, Michael and Jim share a duet of the 1983 single "Islands in the Stream", originally sung by Kenny Rogers and Dolly Parton. At one point during the party, Kevin tells Ryan "Not so fast... 'Fire Guy'". This is a reference to the earlier second-season episode "The Fire", in which Ryan accidentally started a fire in the office building. As a result, Dwight and Michael gave him the nickname "The Fire Guy". When discussing how he got into improv, Michael creates a scenario where Dale Earnhardt told him he was the funniest guy he had ever seen.

== Reception ==
"Email Surveillance" originally aired on NBC in the United States on November 22, 2005. The episode was viewed by 8.1 million viewers and received a 3.9 rating/9% share among adults between the ages of 18 and 49. This means that it was seen by 3.9% of all 18- to 49-year-olds, and 9% of all 18- to 49-year-olds watching television at the time of the broadcast. The episode retained 76 percent of its lead-in My Name Is Earl audience, and was tied with an episode of the medical drama House as the number one television show in the 18–34 male demographic. An encore presentation of the episode, on June 20, 2006, received 2.1 rating/7% share was viewed by over 5 million viewers, ranking it as the number one program in the 18–34 demographic.

"Email Surveillance" received generally positive reviews from television critics. TV Squad's Michael Sciannamea said that "Email Surveillance" was "a solid episode", and that even though "Michael's vulnerabilities were again exposed", in the end "you walk away from the episode feeling good that he did make it to Jim's party." M. Giant from Television Without Pity graded the episode with an "A−". Dan Phillips from IGN named "Michael Crashes Jim's Party" the fifth most awkward moment of the show, noting that, "Few things are more awkward than a party crasher, especially when the party crasher happens to be named Michael Scott."

Erik Adams of The A.V. Club awarded the episode a "B+", and wrote positively of the way the show was able to write-in the presence of the Documentarians into the episode's plot; he compared this to the story arc in the ninth season involving Brian the boom mic operator, noting that the documentarians presence in "Email Surveillance" was much better executed than then the aforementioned Brian plot. He also called the episode's conclusion, featuring Michael and Jim singing a duet, "emotionally satisfying" because it relies "on what these people mean to each other outside of the office".
