= Product Recall =

- The Office episode
- The offending watermark, depicting a cartoon duck and mouse
- Episode no.: Season 3 Episode 21
- Directed by: Randall Einhorn
- Written by: Justin Spitzer; Brent Forrester
- Cinematography by: Matt Sohn
- Editing by: Dean Holland
- Production code: 325
- Original air date: April 26, 2007
- Running time: 21:19

Guest appearances
- Creed Bratton as Creed Bratton; Rashida Jones as Karen Filippelli; Lisa Darr as Barbara Allen; Jim Jansen as Principal; Anthony Russell as Chad Ligh

Episode chronology
← Previous "Safety Training"	Next → "Women's Appreciation"
- The Office (American season 3)

"Product Recall" is the twenty-first episode of the third season of the American comedy television series The Office and the show's forty-ninth episode overall. The series depicts the everyday lives of office employees in the Scranton branch of the fictional Dunder Mifflin Paper Company. In this episode, the company deals with the consequences of an offending watermark that appeared on several reams of paper. Michael Scott (Steve Carell) holds a poorly attended press conference, Jim Halpert (John Krasinski) and Andy Bernard (Ed Helms) head to a high school that printed their prom invitations on the paper to apologize, and Creed Bratton (Creed Bratton) frames an employee at the paper mill to keep his job.

The episode was written by Justin Spitzer and Brent Forrester, and was directed by Randall Einhorn, the series director of photography. The cast found the scene in which Jim impersonates Dwight Schrute (Rainn Wilson) to be hilarious and had trouble keeping straight faces, forcing multiple takes. The episode first aired in the United States on April 26, 2007, on NBC, during sweeps week. According to Nielsen Media Research, the episode was watched by an estimated 7.56 million viewers, earning a ratings share of 3.9/11 among adults. It garnered generally positive critical reception, particularly regarding Jim and Dwight's impressions of each other.

== Synopsis ==
Jim Halpert shows up at work imitating Dwight Schrute by wearing large glasses, a short sleeved shirt and hair split on his forehead and mimicking Dwight's mannerisms.

The Scranton branch of Dunder Mifflin is thrown into damage control mode when reams of paper with an obscene watermark depicting a cartoon duck and mouse having sex are shipped to customers. Michael Scott holds an emergency meeting in which he rebukes Creed Bratton (the branch's quality assurance director) for failing to catch the error, assigns Kelly Kapoor to train the accountants to handle customer support calls, and sends Jim and Andy Bernard to a school that used the affected paper to print prom invitations. At the school, Andy is horrified to discover that his girlfriend is a student there, and is despondent throughout the visit. On the drive back, Jim cheers him up by initiating an a capella performance of "The Lion Sleeps Tonight".

Oscar Martinez and Kevin Malone handle the customer complaints reasonably well, but Angela Martin struggles due to a seeming inability to apologize. Oscar and Kevin taunt her over her failure. When Angela snaps at them "I'm sorry that you're both morons.", they congratulate each other on having made Angela finally apologize for something.

To save his job, Creed calls the paper mill and, with careful queries, learns that a Debbie Brown was out with the flu for one day in the week the watermark went out. He frames Debbie by telling Dwight she failed to meet with him and gave a different excuse for her absence. After Debbie is fired, Creed passes a farewell card around the office and pockets the money collected.

Michael holds an apology press conference, attended by just one local news reporter, where he presents Barbara Allen, an angry customer, with a novelty check for free paper. She instead demands Michael's resignation, but he refuses and angrily ejects her from the office. Though Pam Beesly assures him that the incident will not get significant press coverage, Michael believes more damage control is needed and makes an "apology video" in which he threatens to issue paper with another offensive watermark if he is forced to resign.

Dwight shows up to the office imitating Jim as revenge for Jim's prank, but Jim is merely impressed with the accuracy of the impersonation.

== Production ==
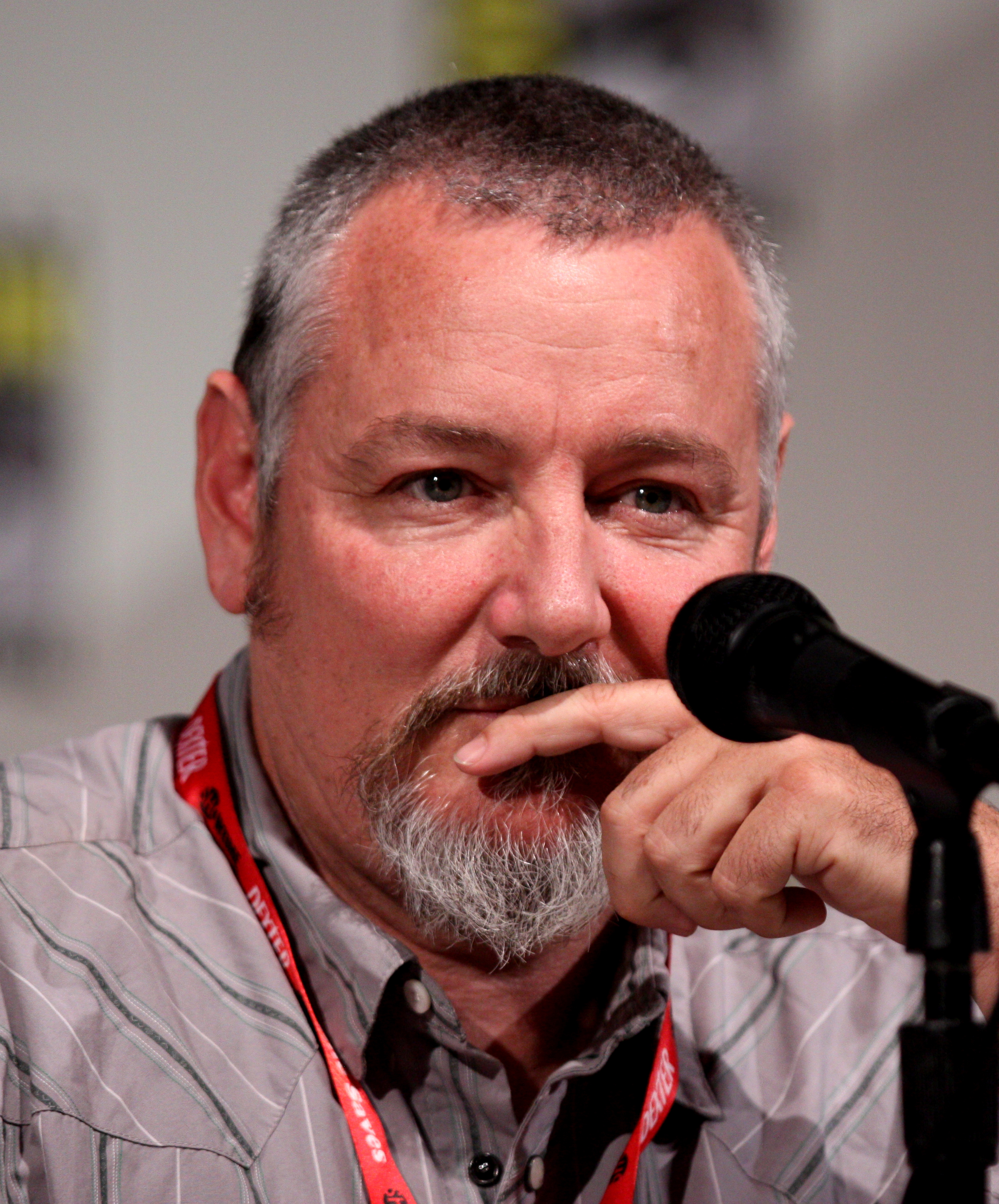
Randall Einhorn earned his third directing credit of the series for this episode.

"Product Recall" was written by staff writer Justin Spitzer and consulting producer Brent Forrester. It was the third Office episode to be directed by Randall Einhorn, a former director of Survivor who also worked as the series' director of photography. In early 2007, series co-creator Greg Daniels explained to an audience at Paleyfest that Einhorn's direction had become "a character in the show because [he] has an enormous amount of judgment/leeway about where he's looking. And often [what] adds a tremendous amount of comedy is the choosing to look over there and see what that person thinks and back and forth. He's definitely a hidden character on the show."

In an April 2007 blog post for TV Guide, actress Kate Flannery, who plays Meredith Palmer, called Jim's impression of Dwight "one of the funniest scenes that I have ever witnessed." She recalled that Krasinski and Wilson enjoyed filming the scene, and that the whole cast was laughing during it, necessitating many takes. The scene was first intended for the season's twenty-second episode, "Women's Appreciation", before it was moved to "Product Recall" due to time constraints.

The third season DVD contains several scenes that were deleted from the final cut of the episode. These include Kelly answering every call with the same response, Dwight contacting CNN, an alternate take of Kelly training the accountants, Creed admitting that he faked his own death for tax reasons, Michael explaining his apology to angry business owner Barbara Allen to the documentary crew, Angela Martin (Angela Kinsey) and Kelly arguing, Jim talking to a high school student, and more scenes of Michael filming his apology video.

== Cultural references ==
When imitating Dwight, Jim says "Bears, beets, Battlestar Galactica," the last term being a reference to the re-imagined science fiction television series. Later, while driving Andy begins a rendition of "Drift Away", and Jim sings "The Lion Sleeps Tonight" to cheer him up. Kelly and Kevin Malone (Brian Baumgartner) have a conversation pretending to be Bridget Jones and the Crocodile Hunter, respectively. Michael worries that Newsweek and CNN will pick up the cartoon scandal story from The Scranton Times.

== Reception ==
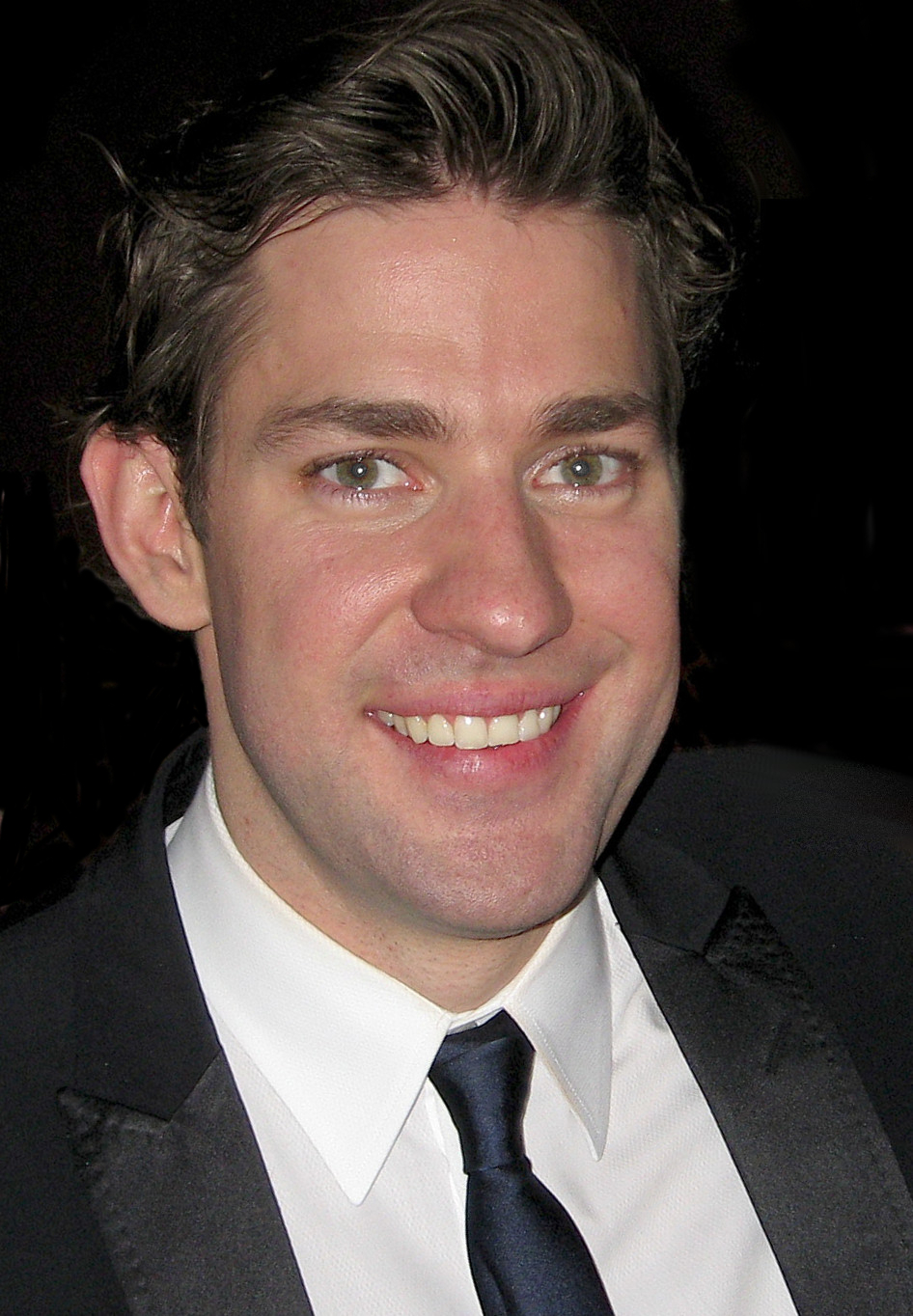
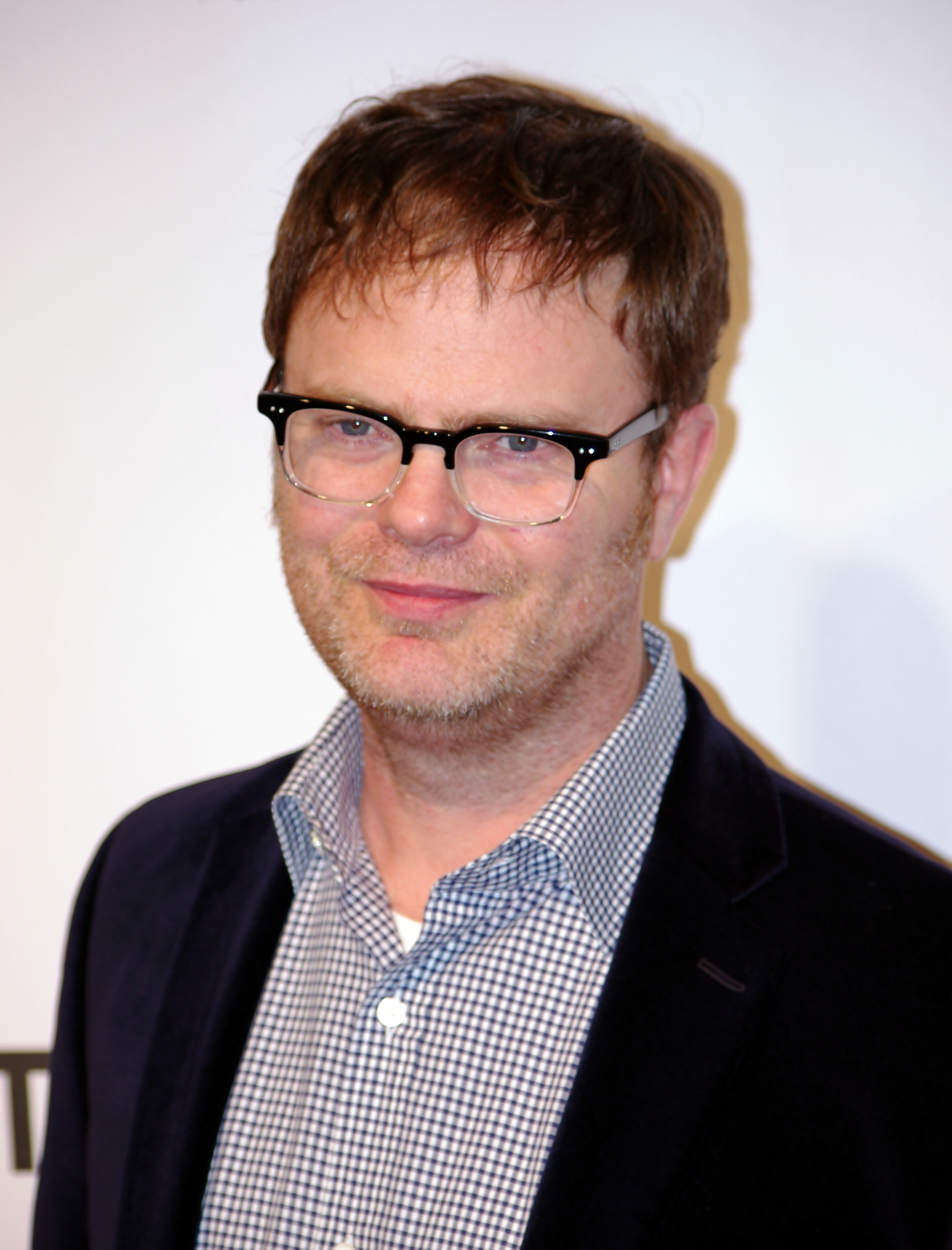
Jim (John Krasinski) and Dwight's (Rainn Wilson) impressions of each other garnered critical acclaim.

"Product Recall" first aired in the United States on April 26, 2007, during the month's sweeps week. According to Nielsen Media Research, it was watched by an estimated 7.56 million viewers. It earned a ratings share of 3.9/11 among adults, meaning that it was seen by 3.9 percent of all 18- to 49-year-olds, and 11 percent of all 18- to 49-year-olds watching television at the time of the broadcast. For its timeslot, the episode finished in second place among adults behind Survivor: Fiji and in first place among men aged 18–34. Among adults, The Office finished in nineteenth place for the week.

IGN's Brian Zoromski rated "Product Recall" with 7.5 out of 10, an indication of a "good" episode. He thought it held "a hit-and-miss mix of laugh-out-loud moments and scenes that didn't work quite as well," but praised the obscene cartoon premise for being "hilarious". Zoromski also criticized the episode for being unrealistic, as Michael dealt with the problem rather than Corporate. He selected Creed and Jim for particular praise, especially liking Jim's Dwight impression.

Like Zoromski, Abby West of Entertainment Weekly critiqued the episode for not involving Corporate, complaining "How could such a public-relations nightmare not lead to a visit or a phone call from Jan?" West did however praise Jim and Dwight's impressions of each other as "perfect" bookendings. Writing for AOL TV, Jay Black called "Product Recall" "wonderful" and highlighted the Jim-Dwight impersonations and Andy's discomfort upon discovering his girlfriend was a high school student. Black did however criticize Michael's press conference as "over-the-top in an annoying way" and Creed's actions as "way over the line" and "despicable". Television Without Pity graded the episode with an A−.
