= Office Olympics =

- The Office episode
- Episode no.: Season 2 Episode 3
- Directed by: Paul Feig
- Written by: Michael Schur
- Cinematography by: Randall Einhorn
- Editing by: David Rogers
- Production code: 2004
- Original air date: October 4, 2005
- Running time: 22 minutes

Guest appearances
- Nancy Walls as Carol Stills; Leslie David Baker as Stanley Hudson; Brian Baumgartner as Kevin Malone; Kate Flannery as Meredith Palmer; Mindy Kaling as Kelly Kapoor; Angela Kinsey as Angela Martin; Paul Lieberstein as Toby Flenderson; Oscar Nunez as Oscar Martinez; Phyllis Smith as Phyllis Lapin

Episode chronology
← Previous "Sexual Harassment"	Next → "The Fire"
- The Office (American season 2)

"Office Olympics" is the third episode of the second season of the television series The Office and the show's ninth episode overall. It was written by Michael Schur and directed by Paul Feig. It originally aired on October 4, 2005, on NBC. The episode guest starred Nancy Carell, the real-life wife of series star Steve Carell, as Carol Stills.

The series depicts the everyday lives of office employees in the Scranton, Pennsylvania branch of the fictional Dunder Mifflin Paper Company. In the episode, Michael Scott (Steve Carell) and Dwight Schrute (Rainn Wilson) leave the office to buy a condo. Meanwhile, Jim Halpert (John Krasinski), along with Pam Beesly (Jenna Fischer), organizes office games and gets his co-workers to play them.

"Office Olympics" was inspired by The King of the Hill Office Olympics, which were created and run by members of the television show King of the Hill. After the episode aired, other "Office Olympics" were organized in actual offices across the country. The episode marks the first appearance of Mose, Dwight's Amish cousin, played by writer Mike Schur. Mose was based on an actual person, with the same name, on the UPN reality show Amish in the City. The episode contained several cultural references, with many alluding to the actual Olympic Games. "Office Olympics" received largely positive reviews from critics. The episode earned a Nielsen rating of 3.9 in the 18–49 demographic and was viewed by 8.3 million viewers.

== Plot ==
While Michael Scott leaves with Dwight Schrute to sign closing papers for Michael's new condominium, the staff fills out their expense reports. Pam Beesly revives a bored Jim Halpert by calling him to the reception desk and throwing objects into Dwight's coffee mug. Jim discovers that his co-workers have their own office games, such as Toby Flenderson's "Dunderball", and Kevin Malone and Oscar Martinez's paper football flicking game, "Hateball" (named because of Angela Martin's dislike for the game). Jim and Pam organize the "Games of the First Dunder Mifflin Olympiad", with staff competing for hand-made medals constructed from yogurt lids and paper clips. The games include "Flonkerton", a game where people race with cartons of paper strapped to their feet; a race walk around the office with full mugs of coffee in hand; and seeing who can stuff the most M&M's into their mouth (though only Kevin makes an attempt). When asked by Pam for additional game ideas, Angela sarcastically replies that she plays "Pam-Pong", counting the number of times Jim walks over to Pam's desk; Pam is visibly surprised by the comment.

At the condominium signing, Dwight finds a variety of things he believes are wrong with the condominium, and Michael realizes he misunderstood the mortgage terms. He gets cold feet, but relents and signs when his agent, Carol Stills, notes that backing out of the deal will cost him his $7,000 deposit. Worried about his ability to pay for the condo by himself, Michael "invites" Dwight to rent and move into the condo's extra bedroom (despite the fact that Dwight already owns a home), but Dwight's incessant questions about his would-be living arrangements so annoy Michael that he withdraws the offer. Michael and Dwight's return to the office brings the games to an abrupt stop, and Michael isolates himself in his office, upset over the closure of his condo.

Ryan Howard throws away his medal in full view of Pam; in an interview with the documentary crew, he reasons that he likely would have thrown it away at a later time anyway. Jim and Pam organize the "closing ceremonies", believing them to be important to the office staff. Michael, apparently unaware of the games, is awarded a gold medal for closing on his condo, and the gesture appears to give him some reassurance of his decision.

== Production ==
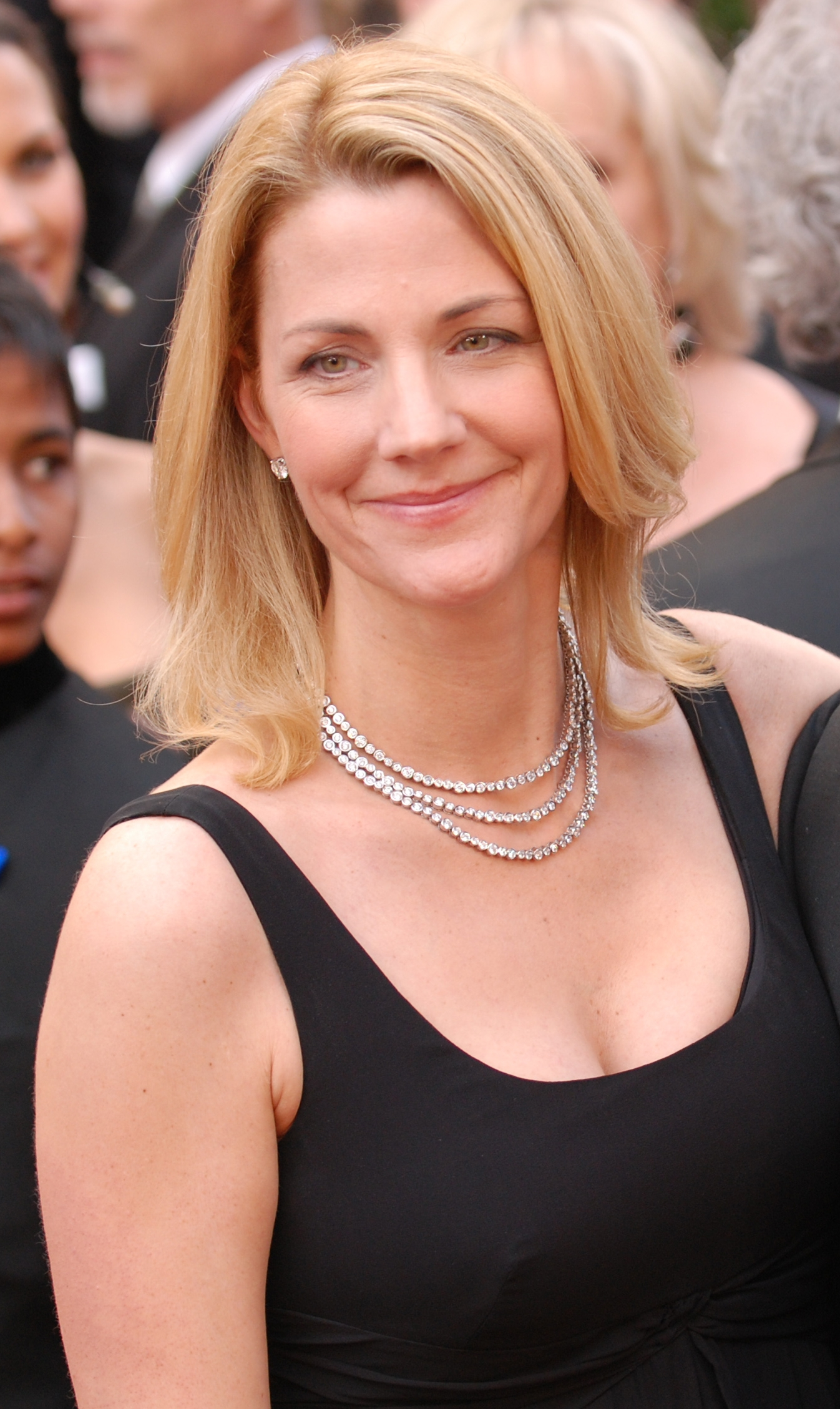
Nancy Walls guest starred in the episode, playing Michael's realtor, Carol.

"Office Olympics" was written by Michael Schur. This episode was the first episode of the series directed by Paul Feig. Producer Greg Daniels said the idea for the actual Office Olympics stemmed from The King of the Hill Office Olympics, which were created and ran by Daniel's former assistant Tim Croston and the show's two production assistants at the time: Tony Gennaro and Seranie Manoogian. The games were held in the King of the Hill offices, where Daniels served as executive producer. Daniels later elaborated on the types of games they played, stating "Like, who’s going to get off the elevator first and races in chairs. The funny thing is then it became a TV episode and it has now gone full circle and I hear offices are doing it all over." After the episode aired, other "Office Olympics" were organized in actual offices across the country. The Chicago Tribune organized an interview with a majority of The Office cast members who—in character—explained the rules to the various games. The Yogurt Lid Medals reappear in the third season finale, "The Job": Receiving the lid and a note from Pam is the catalyst for Jim's decision between Pam and Karen.

When choosing Michael's car for the episode, producer Kent Zbornak brought in pictures of various cars and had the writers choose which one they thought Michael would most likely own. The writers ended up choosing a Chrysler Sebring convertible, because according to B. J. Novak "we figured it's the showiest car that he could afford". While shooting the scene in Michael's car, cameraman Randall Einhorn accidentally broke the back window, which ended up costing $859 to replace.

Writer Mike Schur made a cameo appearance in the episode, appearing in a photograph as Dwight's Amish cousin Mose. The idea for Schur to be Dwight's Amish cousin had been a joke among the writers since the first season. Mose was based on an actual participant, with the same name, on the UPN reality show Amish in the City.

== Cultural references ==
After telling Ryan he can take his pants off and run around the office, Michael makes a direct reference to the 1983 teen comedy-drama film Risky Business. Dwight compares his friendship to Michael, using the analogy that Michael is "like Mozart, and I'm like... Mozart's friend. No. I'm like Butch Cassidy and Michael is like... Mozart." When Michael asks Pam if she had his magazine subscriptions changed to his new address, he mentions Small Businessman, American Way, Maxim, Cracked, and the fictitious Fine Arts Aficionado Monthly. When touring his condo, Michael makes a Mr. Bill joke to the head of the condo association, whose name is Bill. The jokes are a reference to the clay figurine star of a parody of children's shows that was part of Saturday Night Live.

Due to the nature of the episode, several explicit references are made to the Olympic Games. When Jim starts the Office Olympics by lighting the "Torch", he hums "Olympic Fanfare and Theme" by Leo Arnaud and John Williams, one of the themes for the 1984 Summer Olympic games. When the games are finished, the employees play a recording of "The Star-Spangled Banner".

== Reception ==
"Office Olympics" originally aired on NBC in the United States on October 4, 2005. The episode was viewed by 8.3 million viewers and received a 3.9 rating/9% share among adults between the ages of 18 and 49. This means that it was seen by 3.9% of all 18- to 49-year-olds, and 9% of all 18- to 49-year-olds watching television at the time of the broadcast. An encore presentation of the episode, on April 25, 2006, received 1.8 rating/6% share and was viewed by over 4.3 million viewers.

"Office Olympics" received mostly positive reviews. Michael Sciannamea of TV Squad wrote that "The Office has turned the corner into separating itself from the British version." Sciannamea went on to say that "although Michael still garners the most attention, the other characters are beginning to break out." His only criticism of the episode was that "Dwight is too creepy", Sciannamea suggested that the writers "tone down his insanity a bit". "Miss Alli" of Television Without Pity graded the episode with an "A−". Erik Adams of The A.V. Club awarded the episode an "A" and called it the show's "first truly classic episode", due to the added "verve" of both plots. Adams praised the way the main story and Jim and Pam's stories were intercut with each other, so that both could play off of each other; he wrote that "Michael Schur’s a great writer, and Paul Feig knows how to let superb comedic performances flow from his actors, but the stitch-up job here makes the two halves of the episodes complementary when they could’ve rocketed in opposite directions and ripped 'Office Olympics' apart."

Entertainment Weekly named Dwight's line comparing his relationship with Michael to Mozart and Butch Cassidy as one of "TV's funniest lines" for the week ending October 10, 2005. When Pam tries to get Angela to play the games with her fellow employees, Angela cattily reveals that she plays a game called "Pam Pong", where she counts how many times Jim goes to talk to Pam at her reception desk. Pop punk band Sweet Diss and the Comebacks later named one of their songs—a "[Pam] Beesly tribute"—after the game.
