= Sweet Diss and the Comebacks =

- Origin: Ellensburg, Washington, U.S.
- Genres: Power pop, pop punk
- Years active: 2005–present
- Members: Nathan Reinauer; Lori Englehart; Josh Doolin; Tyler Cords
- Website: http://sweetdiss.com/

Sweet Diss and the Comebacks is a power pop band from Washington state. The band's sound is a mix of punk–influenced power pop with copious vocal harmonies and heavy guitar riffs. They are well known for the songs "Pam Pong" and "Dunder and Dwightning," both loving odes to The Office. "Pam Pong" was featured in the documentary Fandomicity about the television series The Office and in the magazine Entertainment Weekly. The band released their latest album Emerald City Love Song on March 1, 2012.
