= Jan Levinson =

- The Office character
- Melora Hardin as Jan Levinson
- First appearance: "Pilot" (2005)
- Last appearance: "Couples Discount" (2013; voice only)
- Created by: Greg Daniels; Ricky Gervais; Stephen Merchant
- Based on: Jennifer Taylor-Clarke (British counterpart)
- Portrayed by: Melora Hardin

In-universe information
- Nicknames: Hillary Rodham Clinton; Godzillary
- Occupation: CEO of Scranton White Pages; Vice President of Sales, Dunder Mifflin; Hospital Supplies Director; CEO and Founder of Serenity by Jan
- Spouse: Mr. Gould (divorced)
- Significant others: Hunter (implied); Michael Scott; Clark Green
- Children: Astrid Levinson (daughter)
- Nationality: American

Janet Levinson (nicknamed Jan; formerly Janet Levinson-Gould) is a recurring fictional character from the US television series The Office, portrayed by Melora Hardin. She is the vice president of Northeast sales at the paper distribution company Dunder Mifflin, directly supervising central character and regional manager of Dunder Mifflin's Scranton branch, Michael Scott. Her character is notable for the dysfunctional relationship she enters with Michael following the second-season episode, "The Client", until the fourth-season episode "Dinner Party". Michael and Jan's personas contrast much of the humor in the series, particularly in their professional attitudes and social interactions, although Jan's erratic and sexually-domineering state of mind leads to her firing. Her counterpart in the British version is corporate manager Jennifer Taylor-Clarke, who was played by Stirling Gallacher.

== Character history ==
=== Season 1–2 ===
Jan is introduced in the pilot episode of the series. As Vice President, her authority leads her to inform Michael of the impending downsizing or closure Scranton's branch faces. She continually reappears both over phone and in person over each season to assert corporate policy on Michael, specifically with health care plans, sexual harassment concerns, and downsizing.

Her character is expanded upon, and changes in tone during "The Client", when Michael and the recently divorced Jan attend a business meeting at a Chili's with Christian, a highly valuable potential client. During the meeting, Jan is unimpressed by Michael's casual and joking attitude, but changes her mind when Michael and Christian's bond leads to Michael closing the business deal. At the end of the episode, Jan and Michael share a kiss. Michael's attempts at a meaningful relationship stemming from that night are rejected, as Jan open-endedly states that she is not ready for a relationship. Her appearances in the second season during a 'women in the workplace' seminar and a financial presentation with CFO David Wallace continue this rejection, despite Michael's advances. However, upon being invited by Michael to the company casino night, she is emotionally hurt by the presence of his other date, Carol Stills, and hastily leaves. With an overnight bag in her Volvo shown to the audience, it is heavily implied that Jan has developed feelings for Michael.

=== Season 3 ===
In the third-season premiere, Jan approves the transfer of Jim Halpert to the Stamford branch after interviewing him in an earlier episode of the second season. She also negotiated a paid three-month vacation and Lexus company car to accountant Oscar Martinez when Michael ignorantly outs him.

After several episodes referring to downsizing, Jan ultimately plans to merge Scranton into Stamford, with some employees being laid off and the rest transferred. Her plan falls apart when Josh Porter, whom she planned on becoming the manager of the merged branches, leverages the position with Staples into a senior management position there. This development influences Jan into merging Stamford with Scranton instead.

Following a Christmas party, Michael calls an unknown woman to invite her to Sandals Resorts Jamaica. It is later revealed that the woman is Jan, when Michael accidentally forwards a risqué photo of Jan tanning to the entire office. The relationship between Jan and Michael becomes official when David Wallace hosts a cocktail party. The duo attend as a couple after disclosing their relationship to HR; Michael immediately declares "I love this woman!" shortly after.

When Michael has a "women's appreciation day", his conversations with the office women lead him to discuss Jan's radical sexual preferences, including recording their intimacy, against Michael's wishes and playing it with a therapist to improve "his form", as well as ignoring Michael's use of their safeword during sex. He realizes his unhappiness with her and breaks up. In the season finale, during which Michael interviews for a corporate position, Jan attempts a reunion. Michael, despite urgings from all women in the Scranton office to the contrary, agrees to get back together with Jan. Unfortunately, the corporate position for which Michael, Jim, and Karen are interviewing is Jan's; after being absent from work, abusing corporate policies, and being in Scranton far too often, Jan is fired and escorted from the building in New York, and is replaced by Ryan Howard.

=== Seasons 4–5 ===
Season four has Jan moving into Michael's condo and starting a scented candle business. Her heedless spending combined with his own poor financial sense rapidly drain Michael's resources. She also sues Dunder Mifflin, claiming wrongful dismissal, although Michael is betrayed by Jan, who uses his private diary as evidence that the company mistreats its employees, and also learning that she gave him a scathing performance review while they were dating. In response, Michael torpedoes her lawsuit by refusing to confirm her negative views of the company, badly damaging their relationship. Following this, during a dinner party, the two fight over each other's eccentricities and Jan throws a Dundie Award at his cheap plasma television before breaking down and nearly being arrested on a destruction of property charge. The two split up, with Michael staying at Schrute Farms a few weeks until Jan packs up her things and moves away for good.

Jan is seen again in the fourth-season finale, in which she is revealed to be pregnant via artificial insemination. Michael goes to her Lamaze classes when Jan asks him to and is incredibly excited to be there for the birth of "their" child. However, he is utterly deflated when Jan gives birth to her daughter Astrid without him there, and when Jan reluctantly lets Michael spend time around her, Michael sadly recognizes that he feels no connection at all to Astrid and that he is no longer holding onto feelings for Jan. Jan also insists Michael not go out with Holly, leading Michael to promptly and successfully ask Holly out on a date.

=== Seasons 7–9 ===
Jan is not seen again until the seventh season, by which time she is employed as a hospital administrator, raises Astrid as a single mother and has recorded a Doris Day cover album. She tells Michael at great length that they were never a good couple and she was slumming by ever dating him; an angry Michael shocks her by saying (wrongly as it turned out) that he has herpes, and later expresses disbelief that he thought she could have been "the one". She reappeared on the show in a cameo scene in Michael's self-produced movie "Threat Level Midnight", playing a covert agent jazz singer named Jasmine Windsong who slips key information to Agent Michael Scarn and gets killed by an assassin.

In the ninth-season episode "The Whale", Jan is now back in Scranton, working as an executive at the White Pages phone book company. Dwight and Pam make the sales call in her office, initially unaware that she is the contact. Jan had no intention of giving Dunder Mifflin her business, and had intended to refuse David Wallace (now the owner and CEO of Dunder Mifflin) personally in retaliation for firing her several years before; she is dismayed when Dwight and Pam arrive instead.

Nevertheless, Dwight keeps her from refusing by assigning Customer Service representative Clark Green as her personal liaison. The two hit it off and travel abroad for several weeks. In "Suit Warehouse", Clark returns to the office, having gotten Jan to sign on as a client after spending several weeks in Europe as her lover. Jan also sent an expensive Italian-made espresso machine back with Clark as a gift to the staff.

Jan is heard over the phone in "Couples Discount"; Andy Bernard, now the Scranton regional manager, points out that Dwight had offered a discounted price without getting Andy's approval (something that would've been impossible for Dwight to do, as Andy himself was abroad at the time), and attempted to renegotiate Dunder Mifflin's contract with the White Pages. Infuriated, Jan proceeds to terminate her contract with Dunder Mifflin altogether. Andy later admits that he spitefully tanked the sale because the staff was hostile to him upon his return from overseas.

In "Finale", it is mentioned that Dwight (who succeeded Andy as regional manager) managed to reacquire the White Pages' business by again offering the discounted price. Jan is not referenced over the course of the documentary's TV release and is not invited to any of the events connected to it.

== Behind the scenes ==
Jan's first appearance is in the pilot episode, in which she discusses the prospect of downsizing with regional manager Michael Scott, played by Steve Carell. Jan's portrayer, Melora Hardin, revealed that when she auditioned for the role of Jan, she had also auditioned for a role in the short-lived CBS drama Wolf Lake. Hardin initially expressed interest in Wolf Lake, as it was a lead role, but ultimately went for the role of Jan at the insistence of the casting director: "[The casting director] had told me that she really wanted me to get the part on The Office. In the end, she was right."

In an episode of the Office Ladies podcast, Hardin revealed that she had been unsure if her character would return to the show, as Jan only had a brief appearance in the pilot. While filming the pilot, co-creator Greg Daniels noted the chemistry between Jan and Michael. Hardin recalled: "I remember sitting at the tables with Greg Daniels and Steve Carell, and we were all laughing at, kind of, how weirdly interesting Jan and Michael were together." Finding potential in Jan and Michael's relationship, the writers expressed interest in expanding Jan's character if the series was picked up for a second season. In the season 2 episode "The Client", Michael and Jan kiss after a successful meeting with an important client. Reflecting on the kiss, Hardin stated "I thought it was a great first kiss for the two of them. [...] It has the kind of 'wait that's so wrong' and 'wait a second, I want more of that' thing that I think Jan struggled with the entire relationship with Michael."

Jan ultimately gets fired at the end of season 3, and begins to have a less prominent role in the show after breaking up with Michael in season 4. Jan continues to make sporadic appearances throughout the series; her final on-screen appearance was in the ninth-season episode "The Whale", and she has a brief voice role in "Couples Discount". Hardin was initially told she would come back in the series finale, but the plans never came to fruition. Despite this, Hardin expressed that the writers had wrapped up the series very well, and was pleased at the overall conclusion of Jan's character, stating: "It was really great to see her back in the corporate world."
