= Suit Warehouse =

- The Office episode
- Episode no.: Season 9 Episode 11
- Directed by: Matt Sohn
- Written by: Dan Greaney
- Cinematography by: Sarah Levy
- Editing by: David Rogers
- Production code: 9012
- Original air date: January 17, 2013
- Running time: 22 minutes

Guest appearances
- Ed Lauter as Sam Stone Sr.; Will Greenberg as Sam Stone Jr.; Sam Richardson as Colin

Episode chronology
← Previous "Lice"	Next → "Customer Loyalty"
- The Office (American season 9)

"Suit Warehouse" is the eleventh episode of the ninth season of the American comedy television series The Office and the 187th episode overall. The episode was written by Dan Greaney and directed by Matt Sohn. It originally aired on NBC on January 17, 2013.

The series depicts the everyday lives of office employees in the Scranton, Pennsylvania branch of the fictional Dunder Mifflin Paper Company. In the episode, Clark returns from his stint as Jan's assistant and Dwight Schrute (Rainn Wilson) enlists his help; the two pose as a father and son so that they can successfully sell to the owner of a suit warehouse. Darryl Philbin (Craig Robinson) travels to Philadelphia with Pam Halpert (Jenna Fischer) to interview at Jim's new company. Meanwhile, Pam starts to realize that her family may have to leave Scranton.

"Suit Warehouse" received mainly positive reviews from critics. The episode was also viewed by 4.15 million viewers and received a 2.1/5 percent rating among adults between the ages of 18 and 49, ranking second in its timeslot. The episode ultimately ranked as the highest-rated NBC series of the night.

== Synopsis ==
Darryl Philbin is off to Philadelphia to interview at Jim Halpert's new company, Athlead, and Pam Halpert decides to come along, since office manager Andy Bernard is still not back from his sailboat excursion. She asks Erin Hannon to take care of a shipment of pens while she is gone. Pam's lack of specific instructions leaves Erin in a state of indecision over whether she should put the pens away once they arrive. She eventually decides to put them away for fear of being called lazy, but as she does so the other office workers teasingly accuse her of trying to take over Pam's job of office administrator in her absence. Overwhelmed, Erin puts the pens back in the shipping box.

On the drive to Athlead, Darryl opens up to Pam that he is worried about the interview, having had bad experience with interviews. At Jim's new company, Pam gives Darryl a thumbs up as he heads into the interview room, and then is chatted up by an employee who says "Jim speaks about you all the time" and we "can't wait for you to move here." The thought of moving to Philadelphia disturbs her. Meanwhile, Darryl initially fumbles his interview due to nerves and feelings of inadequacy, but everyone else helps calm him down, and he makes a strong reversal. Darryl concludes the interview by attempting to shoot a basket with the room's sports decorations, but instead knocks a light fixture into the fish tank, electrocuting all the fish. Pam commiserates with Darryl over this embarrassing misstep. Jim returns to inform Darryl that although he will have to pay for the fish, he has the job. During the drive home, Darryl gushes over his new job and the chance to live in Philadelphia while Pam worries about where she and her family will be in the future.

At Dunder Mifflin, Clark Green returns from his stint as Jan Levinson's sexual assistant, in exchange for Jan giving them her business. Despite the awkward past couple of weeks, Jan has gifted them an espresso machine, and the rest of the office jumps on the opportunity to "test" out several espresso flavors. Dwight Schrute enlists Clark's help to snag a newly freed account at a suit warehouse; the two will pose as a father and son so that they can successfully sell to the Stones, father and son owners of the warehouse. Dwight leads off on how proud he is of Clark to Sam Stone Sr., but when Stone admits that he and his own son are not on good terms, Dwight and Clark awkwardly shift gears and begin a show of childishly sniping at each other. Clark tries to move on to business, but Dwight continues to interrupt him with insults, and even makes a dig at Sam Stone Jr. when he arrives. When the elder Stone reveals that his son has forced him out of the company and that he is now there strictly for his own social benefit, Clark takes the lead and makes the sale to the younger Stone. Both Dwight and Clark also buy a suit from the company to celebrate their team sale.

Back at the office, the staff have drunk multiple cups of espresso and experience a caffeine rush along with a powerful surge in office productivity. As the rush dies down, they all begin to sweat profusely, become highly irritable and argumentative, try to relocate the copy machine and frantically tear up the office carpet to reveal the hardwood underneath. At five o'clock everybody leaves the office in total disarray. When Pam and Darryl arrive back from Philadelphia, Erin angrily tells Pam she didn't take care of the pens, and they are bewildered by the sight they encounter.

== Production ==
"Suit Warehouse" was written by consulting producer Dan Greaney, his second writing credit for the series, after "Mrs. California". The episode was also directed by Matt Sohn, his seventh directorial effort for the series, following the ninth season entry, "Roy's Wedding". The episode features the return of series regular Clark Duke, having previously left for several episodes in order to film Kick-Ass 2. The episode is the fourth not to feature Andy Bernard (Ed Helms). Helms left the series temporarily, in the season's sixth episode, "The Boat", in order to film The Hangover Part III.

The official website of The Office included several cut scenes from "Suit Warehouse" within a week of the episode's release. In the first 64-second clip, more scenes of the effect of the espresso machine are seen and the increased productivity from the Scranton branch. In the second 47-second clip, Erin grows ecstatic when the pens are finally delivered. In the third 80-second clip, the Scranton branch gets distracted on their smartphones.

== Cultural references ==
When Oscar gets excited about drinking all the types of espresso, he shouts "YOLO", a carpe diem-esque phrase popularized by the song "The Motto" by Canadian rapper Drake. Pam calls Jim "Gumby with hair" to calm down a nervous Darryl; this is a reference to the green clay humanoid character created and modeled by Art Clokey, who also created Davey and Goliath. Both Pam and Darryl marvel at how Jim has managed to "Zuckerberg" his new office, a reference to Mark Zuckerberg, the American programmer and internet entrepreneur, who founded Facebook.

== Broadcast and reception ==
=== Ratings ===
"Suit Warehouse" originally aired on NBC on January 17, 2013. In its original American broadcast, the episode was viewed by 4.15 million viewers and received a 2.1 rating/5 percent share among adults between the ages of 18 and 49. This means that it was seen by 2.1 percent of all 18- to 49-year-olds, and 5 percent of all 18- to 49-year-olds watching television at the time of the broadcast. The Office ranked second in its timeslot, being beaten by an episode of the ABC series Grey's Anatomy which received a 3.0 rating/8% share. In addition, The Office was the highest-rated NBC television program on the night it aired.

=== Reviews ===
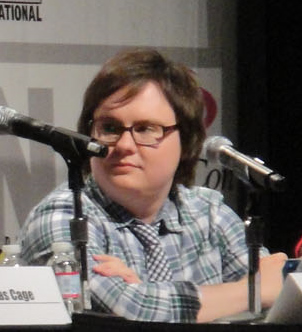
The episode featured the return of Clark Duke, who received positive reviews for his performance and storyline.

IGN writer Cindy White criticized the espresso subplot and the episode in general, for the lack of authority in the office, due to Jim, Andy and Pam leaving the office. She also called the plot too similar to the season 5 episode, "Cafe Disco". She complimented the use of the ensemble players throughout the plot and praised the Dwight-Clark storyline, comparing it positively to the season 3 episode, "Traveling Salesmen". She also compared the Jim-Darryl-Pam storyline to the style of the early seasons, writing that it "was the stuff of classic Office, making you cringe as you are forced watch someone digging a hole deeper and deeper for himself". She gave the episode a 7.5/10, calling it "Good". Damon Houx of Screen Crush called the episode "solid" and praised the use of the whole ensemble cast. He also complimented the build-up towards a future conflict between Jim and Pam, and said that while he is "still waiting for the show to hit the gravitational pull of wrapping up" and that the show "probably should have ended three years ago", the episode was still good. New York writer Michael Tedder wrote that the episode had a nice balance of cringe humor, particularly in Darryl's job interview for Athlead. He also praised the set-up for the Dwight-Clark subplot, saying that the plotline was perfect for their dynamic and could not work with previous seasons. He was also complimentary towards the espresso subplot and gave the episode four out of five stars.
