= Lice (The Office) =

- The Office episode
- Episode no.: Season 9 Episode 10
- Directed by: Rodman Flender
- Written by: Niki Schwartz-Wright
- Cinematography by: Matt Sohn
- Editing by: Josh Belson
- Production code: 9011
- Original air date: January 10, 2013
- Running time: 22 minutes

Guest appearances
- Julius Erving as himself; Ameenah Kaplan as Val Johnson

Episode chronology
← Previous "Dwight Christmas"	Next → "Suit Warehouse"
- The Office (American season 9)

"Lice" is the tenth episode of the ninth season of the American comedy television series The Office and the 186th episode overall. The episode was written by Niki Schwartz-Wright and directed by Rodman Flender. It originally aired on NBC on January 10, 2013. The episode guest stars Julius "Dr. J" Erving as himself.

The series depicts the everyday lives of office employees in the Scranton, Pennsylvania branch of the fictional Dunder Mifflin Paper Company. In this episode, Pam Halpert (Jenna Fischer) accidentally brings lice into the office but lets Meredith Palmer (Kate Flannery) take the fall, while Dwight Schrute (Rainn Wilson) vows to destroy the parasites. Meanwhile, Jim Halpert (John Krasinski) spends a great day in Philadelphia with a potential business associate (Erving); Nellie Bertram (Catherine Tate), Phyllis Vance (Phyllis Smith), and Kevin Malone (Brian Baumgartner) interfere with Darryl Philbin's (Craig Robinson) love life.

"Lice" received mixed reviews from television critics; many reviewers enjoyed the emphasis the episode placed on Flannery's character, although others felt the story did not work. The episode was also viewed by 4.54 million viewers and received a 2.2/6 percent rating among adults between the ages of 18 and 49, ranking third in its timeslot. The episode ultimately ranked as the highest-rated NBC series of the night.

== Synopsis ==
Pam Halpert finds managing her household without her husband Jim to be more difficult than anticipated, as she struggles with duties such as taking out the trash. Her already frazzled condition worsens when she finds lice on her daughter Cece, leaving her no choice but to wash all the fabric in the house. At work the next day, she notices Meredith Palmer frantically scratching her head, and realizes she may have transferred the lice from Cece to the office. She initiates an investigation and Erin Hannon, who experienced numerous lice infestations as a child in foster care, finds that all of the employees except Darryl Philbin, Nellie Bertram, Phyllis Vance, and Kevin Malone have lice. Given her disregard for cleanliness, the employees assume Meredith is responsible; Pam defends her but neglects to admit her guilt. To eliminate the lice, Meredith shaves her head. Dwight Schrute also overreacts, donning a hazmat suit and accidentally exposing himself to a hallucinogenic bug bomb that causes him to faint.

On Erin's advice, the other infected employees pair up to put mayonnaise on each other's hair to suffocate the lice, which allows Pete Miller and Erin to spend time together and Angela Martin to prank Oscar Martinez in retaliation for his affair with her husband. Pam's mother calls to inform her that Cece still has lice; the other staff overhear and realize Pam is responsible for the lice infestation, much to Meredith's delight.

Jim goes to Philadelphia to meet with a potential investor in his sports marketing company; the investor is none other than Julius "Dr. J" Erving, a personal hero of Jim's. Being sensitive to how difficult it must be to manage the house and kids by herself, Jim does not tell her who the investor is during their phone conversations and pretends to be stressed over the meeting; Pam, in turn, affects to be having no problems so that she will not add to Jim's supposed stress. Back at the office, Pam apologizes to Meredith, and the two go out for a beer. While at the bar, Pam tells Meredith—who is a single parent—she now realizes how hard it is to handle children without a husband. The two bond throughout the night, singing a karaoke version of "Girls Just Want to Have Fun".

The uninfected workers are sent down to the warehouse to avoid contracting lice. Darryl had recently manipulated the warehouse foreman Val into breaking up with him because he wanted to have a new start when he moves to Philadelphia for his job at Jim's new sports marketing company. Darryl tells the others about this and feigns heartbreak to gain their sympathy and appear that the breakup was not his choice. Nellie, Phyllis, and Kevin confront Val and try to convince her to take Darryl back, to no avail. However, when Kevin then asks out Val, she is so mortified at her apparent dating prospects that she decides to get back together with Darryl, much to his annoyance.

== Production ==
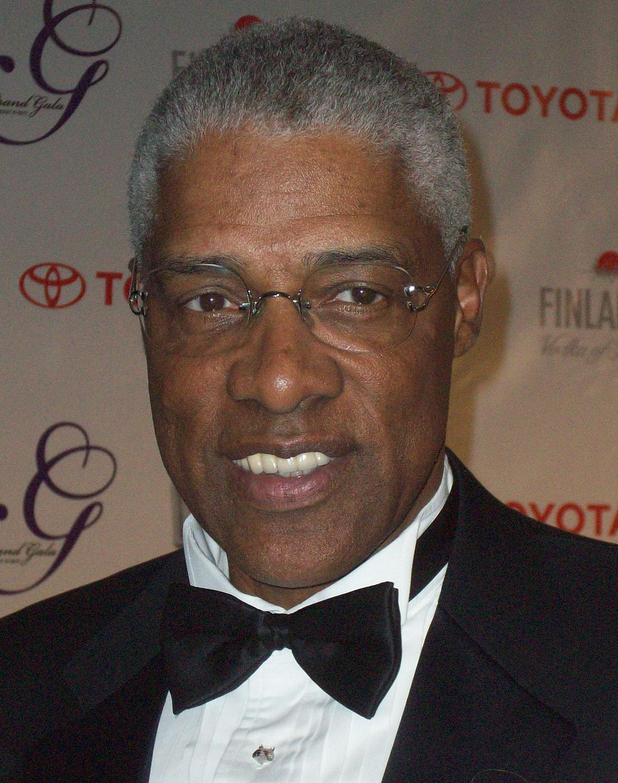
The episode guest starred Julius Erving, who portrayed himself.

"Lice" was written by story editor Niki Schwartz-Wright, marking her debut writing credit for the series. It was directed by Rodman Flender. This marked his second directorial effort for the series, after the earlier ninth season entry "The Whale". As mentioned before, the episode guest starred Erving as himself. In addition, "Lice" featured performances by Ameenah Kaplan, who reprised her role as Val; and Linda Purl as Pam's mother, whose voice was heard on the phone. This is the third episode to not feature Andy Bernard (Ed Helms) or Clark (Clark Duke). Helms left the show temporarily in the season's sixth episode "The Boat" in order to film The Hangover Part III, whereas Duke left for a few episodes to film Kick-Ass 2.

Kate Flannery did not actually shave her head for the episode. According to her Twitter account, make-up artist Ed French was responsible for the bald cap and Kim M. Ferry designed the shaved hair effect. According to the actress, the prosthetics took three hours to apply. Afterwards, she joked that she has "newfound respect for the actors in Planet of the Apes!"

The scenes at the end of the episode take place at The Bog; this is an actual bar in Scranton. In addition, the exterior shots were all actually filmed in Scranton. Reportedly, parts of the scenes were filmed with an iPhone.

== Cultural references ==
Jim compares spending a day with Julius Erving to a hypothetical situation wherein Pam would spend the day with John Stamos. Pam and Meredith bond over karaoke, and the two sing the song "Girls Just Want to Have Fun", which was made famous by Cyndi Lauper in 1983.

== Broadcast and reception ==
=== Ratings ===
"Lice" originally aired on NBC on January 10, 2013. In its original American broadcast, the episode was viewed by 4.54 million viewers and received a 2.2 rating/6 percent share among adults between the ages of 18 and 49. This means that it was seen by 2.2 percent of all 18- to 49-year-olds, and 6 percent of all 18- to 49-year-olds watching television at the time of the broadcast. The Office ranked third in its timeslot, being beaten by an episode of the CBS series Person of Interest which received a 2.9/8 percent rating, and an entry of the ABC series Grey's Anatomy which received a 3.2/8 percent rating. In addition, The Office was the highest-rated NBC television program on the night it aired. The episode was the twenty-fourth most-watched episode of television for the week it aired in the 18–49 demographic, with 2.772 million viewers in the age group.

=== Reviews ===
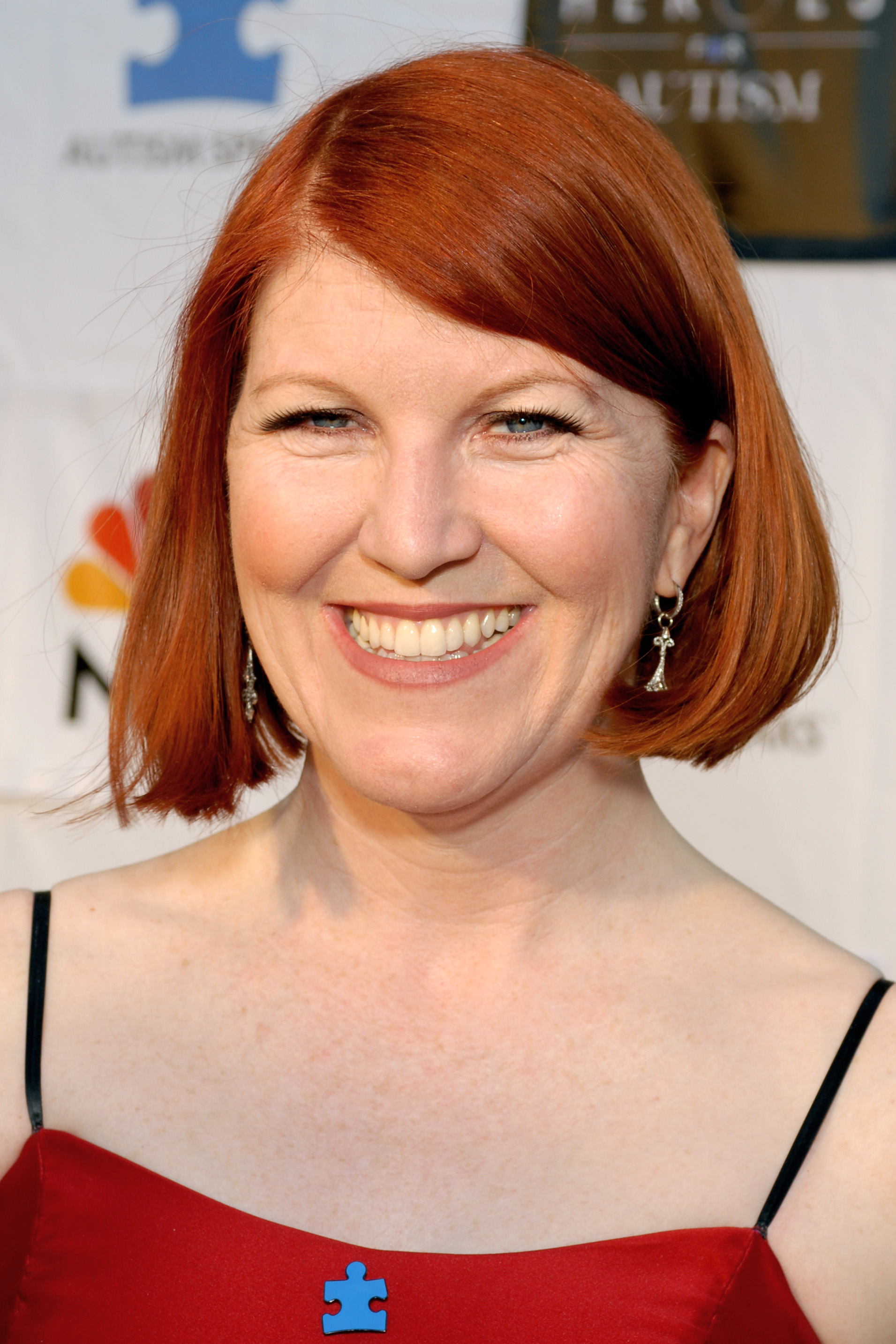
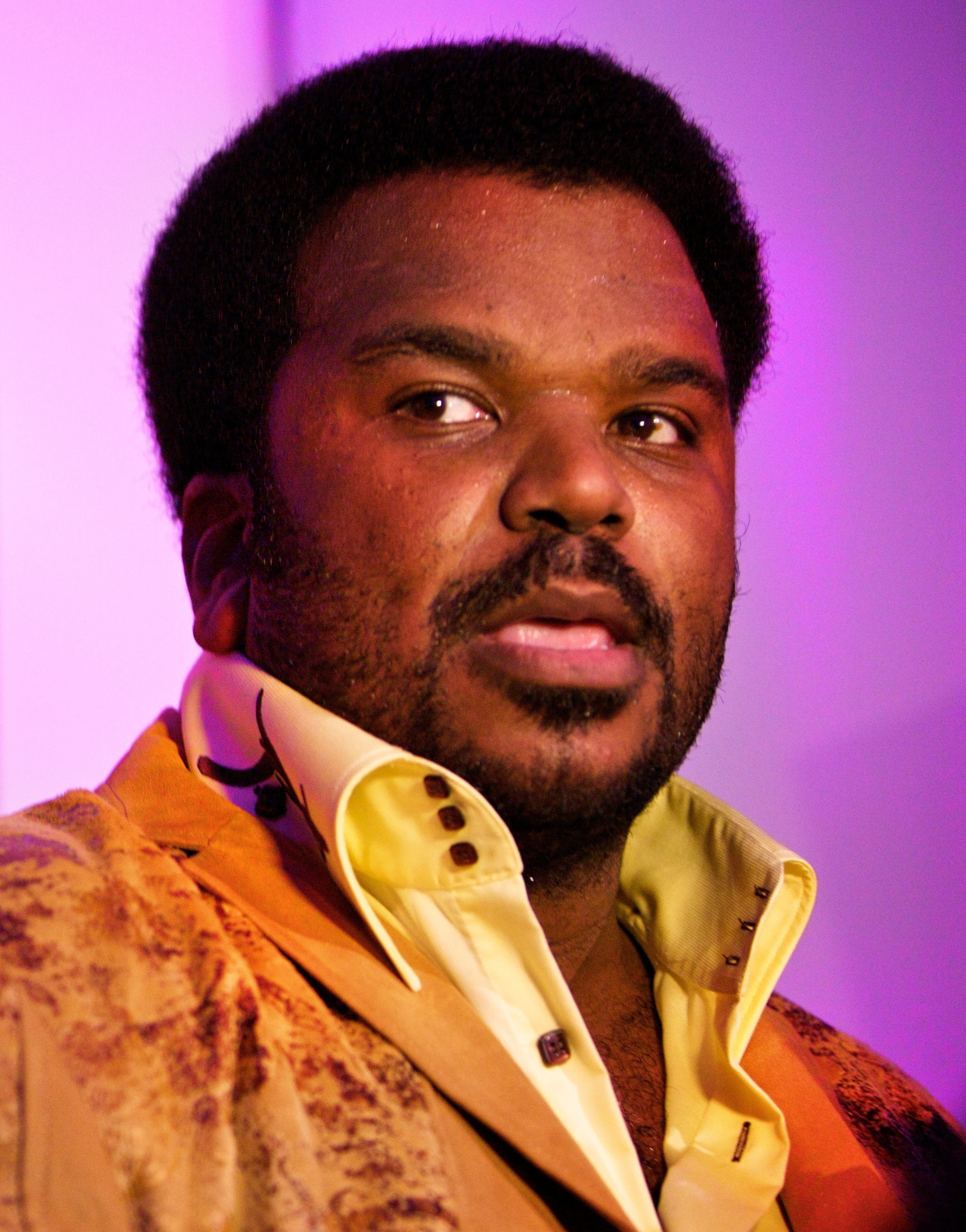
Many critics praised the storyline with Meredith Palmer (Kate Flannery, left), but were unimpressed with Darryl Philbin's (Craig Robinson, right).

USA Today writer Whitney Matheson called the episode "the funniest ep this season" and that "it also ranks as one of the best since Steve Carell's departure in 2011". She lauded Flannery's performance, writing that "the actress has never made me laugh harder than on last night's episode". Mark Trammell of TV Equals called the episode "excellent"; he was particularly pleased with the episode's humor. Michael Tedder of Vulture awarded the episode four out of five stars and said that it allowed Meredith, who until the episode had been "a mostly one-dimensional source of promiscuity jokes" to have "two dimensions for once". He also applauded Fischer's performance, writing that it "would make for a terrific Emmy submission episode".

Farihah Zaman of The A.V. Club awarded the episode a "B" and criticized its excessive narrative threads. She felt that Pam and Jim's separation brought "out the worst in them", but that "the same situations that force Jim and Pam to confront their flaws reveal the overlooked strengths of a couple of less prominent characters". She also wrote that the ending was "touching" because it humanized Meredith and made her out as a "badass". Cindy White of IGN awarded the episode a score of 7.8 out of 10, denoting a "good" episode. She felt that the final scenes with Pam and Meredith singing were "a nice callback to the show's glory days" and made the ending feel "layered and grounded". White also applauded the short sequence that showed many of the office staff mundanely going about their day with mayonnaise on their heads, noting that the pacing was reminiscent of the first season when the episodes "had room to breathe". White, however, did feel that Jim's storyline was too reminiscent of the story arc in the fifth season when Pam went to art school.

Nick Campbell of TV.com wrote an extremely negative review of the episode and called it "terrible". He felt that Pam's behavior due to Jim being gone was uncalled for. Furthermore, he felt that Dwight "swung too far into the territory that is known as 'annoying caricature'". Campbell did, however, write highly of Ellie Kemper, saying that "she's played [her character] funnily and warmly as anyone else". Several reviewers argued that the episode functioned as a filler episode. Brett Davinger of The California Literary Review called it the "epitome of filler". ScreenCrush reviewer Damon Houx wrote that "if everyone were in the same location this would be a bottle episode". Furthermore, Darryl's subplot was mostly criticized. Tedder wrote that while "it's fine to have a story line where someone pursues something and then realizes it wasn't what it was cracked up to be" he wished that the show had actually developed Val as a character. White wrote that she did not enjoy seeing "this manipulative version of Darryl" because it contrasted with his earlier characterization in episodes like "The Deposition". Zaman called the subplot "surprising".
