= The Office (American TV series) season 9 =

Season of television series

The Office
- Season 9
- DVD cover
- Showrunner: Greg Daniels
- Starring: Rainn Wilson; John Krasinski; Jenna Fischer; Ed Helms; Catherine Tate; Leslie David Baker; Brian Baumgartner; Creed Bratton; Clark Duke; Kate Flannery; Mindy Kaling; Ellie Kemper; Angela Kinsey; Jake Lacy; Paul Lieberstein; B. J. Novak; Oscar Nunez; Craig Robinson; Phyllis Smith
- No. of episodes: 25

Release
- Original network: NBC
- Original release: September 20, 2012 – May 16, 2013

Season chronology
- ← Previous; Season 8

The ninth and final season of the American television comedy The Office premiered on NBC on September 20, 2012, and concluded on May 16, 2013, consisting of 25 episodes. The Office is an American adaptation of the British comedy series, and is presented in a mockumentary format, portraying the daily lives of office employees in the Scranton, Pennsylvania branch of the fictitious Dunder Mifflin Paper Company. The ninth season of The Office aired on Thursdays at 9:00 p.m. (Eastern) in the United States, as part of the Comedy Night Done Right television block. It stars Rainn Wilson, John Krasinski, Jenna Fischer, and Ed Helms, with supporting performances from Catherine Tate, Leslie David Baker, Brian Baumgartner, Creed Bratton, Clark Duke, Kate Flannery, Mindy Kaling, Ellie Kemper, Angela Kinsey, Jake Lacy, Paul Lieberstein, B. J. Novak, Oscar Nunez, Craig Robinson, and Phyllis Smith. This is the second season not to star Steve Carell as lead character Michael Scott, although he returned for a cameo appearance in the series finale.

The ninth season largely focuses on the relationship between Jim (John Krasinski) and Pam Halpert (Jenna Fischer). After Jim decides to follow his dream and start a sports marketing company in Philadelphia, Pam begins to worry about moving, and the couple's relationship experiences stress. Meanwhile, Andy Bernard (Ed Helms) abandons the office for a three-month boating trip, eventually quitting his job to pursue his dream of becoming a star, although he soon becomes famous for a viral video. Dwight Schrute (Rainn Wilson) is finally promoted to regional manager. The documentary airs, and a year later, the office members gather for Dwight and Angela's marriage and a final round of interviews.

Following the decline in ratings from the previous year, the ninth season of The Office managed to stabilize around 4 million viewers per episode. The series finale, however, was watched by over 5.69 million viewers, making it the highest-rated episode that the show had aired in over a year. The season ranked as the ninety-fourth most watched television series during the 2012–13 television year and saw a decrease in ratings from the previous season. Critical reception was moderately positive; although some critics took issue with certain aspects, such as the reveal of the in-series documentary crew, many argued that it was an improvement over the previous season. Others lauded the way the show was able to successfully wrap-up its story arcs. "Finale" was nominated for three awards at the 65th Primetime Emmy Awards, and won for Outstanding Single-Camera Picture Editing for a Comedy Series.

== Production ==
The ninth season of the show was produced by Shine America and Deedle-Dee Productions, both in association with Universal Television. The show is based on the British comedy series of the same name, which was created by Ricky Gervais and Stephen Merchant for the BBC. In addition, the two are executive producers on the show. On May 11, 2012, NBC renewed The Office for a ninth season. Series developer Greg Daniels returned as showrunner this season. Daniels stated that the season would feature more big season arcs, saying "I'll tell you that the last couple of years, I don't think we did any big arc-type things in the way that we used to in the beginning, I think the thing we're going to do is bring back a lot of arcs." Brent Forrester, who had been a consulting producer and writer since the third season was promoted to executive producer, alongside new series writer Dan Sterling.

In a conference call on August 21, 2012, Daniels announced that this would be the final season of the series. Daniels said, "This year feels like the last chance to really go out together and make an artistic ending for the show that pays off a lot of the stuff that matters most to fans." Daniels also said all the questions would be answered, such as who was behind the documentary, and why they had been filming it for so long, as well as the reveal of the Scranton Strangler. A central point during the season was the romance between Erin Hannon (Ellie Kemper) and Pete Miller (Jake Lacy). According to Michael Ausiello of TVLine, the nature of their relationship was heavily debated by the writers and producers; he noted that "the triangle [between Andy, Erin, and Pete] has stirred up a number of debates in the writers room, which tells me even they don't know at this point which guy Erin will choose." Daniels consulted with Kemper and asked for her input, as he felt she had the best understanding of Erin's characterization.

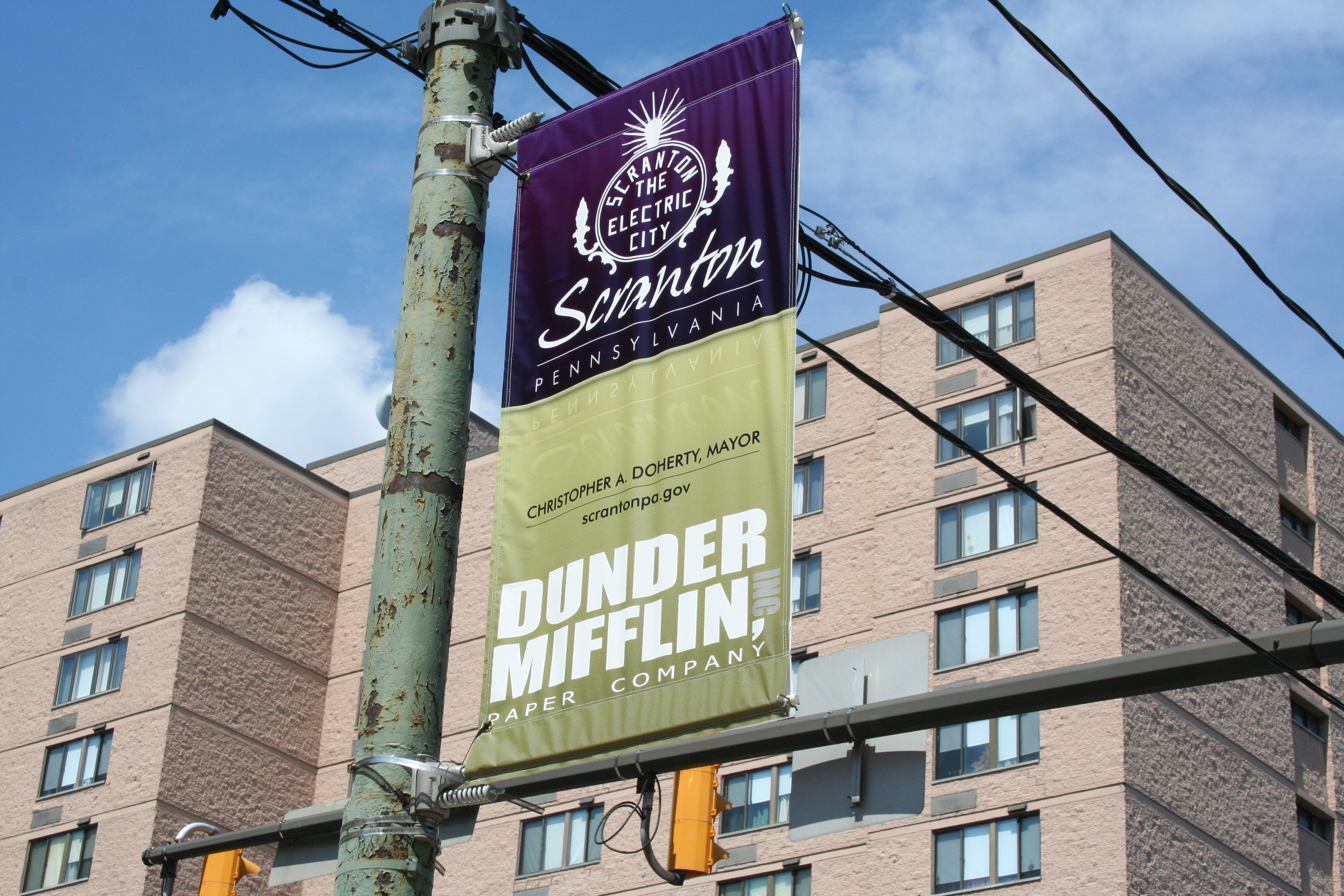
Angela Kinsey and Rainn Wilson noted that the cast wanted to film an episode in Scranton, Pennsylvania, where the series is set, although this never came to fruition.

For the season, cast members John Krasinski, Jenna Fischer, Rainn Wilson, and Ed Helms were credited as producers. Krasinski also directed an episode. Guest directors for the season included Bryan Cranston, who directed the episode "Work Bus", and filmmaker Jon Favreau, who directed the episode "Moving On". Daniels directed the first episode, which he also wrote. This marked the first time that he had both written and directed an episode of The Office since the fourth season entry "Fun Run". Ken Kwapis directed the series finale; he also directed the show's pilot episode. While The Office was mainly filmed on a studio set at Valley Center Studios in Van Nuys, California, the city of Scranton, Pennsylvania, where the show is set, was also used for shots of the opening theme. Angela Kinsey and Rainn Wilson, during an interview, expressed the hope to film an episode of the season in Scranton. Although this never came to fruition, exterior shots of the real Scranton bar The Bog were featured in the tenth episode "Lice".

Originally, the season was supposed to contain 24 episodes, which would have meant that the series aired exactly 200 episodes. However, the series' penultimate episode was elongated into 2 separate episodes, resulting in "Finale"—which was announced previously as an hour-long special—being the 24th and 25th episodes of the season. This meant that the last part of "Finale" is the series' 201st episode. On March 19, 2013, the official Office fansite OfficeTally launched a campaign on Change.org to "super-size or extend" the finale; this campaign was motivated by a statement made by Daniels, in which he mentioned he would "beg" the studio to air a longer episode. On May 2, 2013, the petition amassed 20,000 signatures. On May 7, NBC announced the series finale would be extended, and air in a 75-minute time slot. A one-hour retrospective of the series aired before the one-hour series finale on May 16.

== Cast ==
The Office employs an ensemble cast. Most of the main characters, and some supporting ones, are based on characters from the British version of The Office. While these characters normally have the same attitudes and perceptions as their British counterparts, the roles have been redesigned to better fit the American show. The show is known for its large cast size, many of whom are known particularly for their improvisational work.

=== Main ===
- Rainn Wilson as Dwight Schrute, based upon Gareth Keenan, who is the office's top-performing sales representative.
- John Krasinski as Jim Halpert, a sales representative and prankster, who is based upon Tim Canterbury, and is married to Pam Halpert, the office administrator.
- Jenna Fischer as Pam Halpert, who is based on Dawn Tinsley, is shy, but is often a cohort with Jim in his pranks on Dwight.
- Ed Helms as Andy Bernard, the preppy manager and boastful Cornell alumnus whose love for a cappella music and awkward social skills generate mixed feelings from his employees.

=== Starring ===
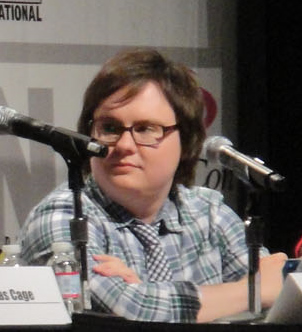
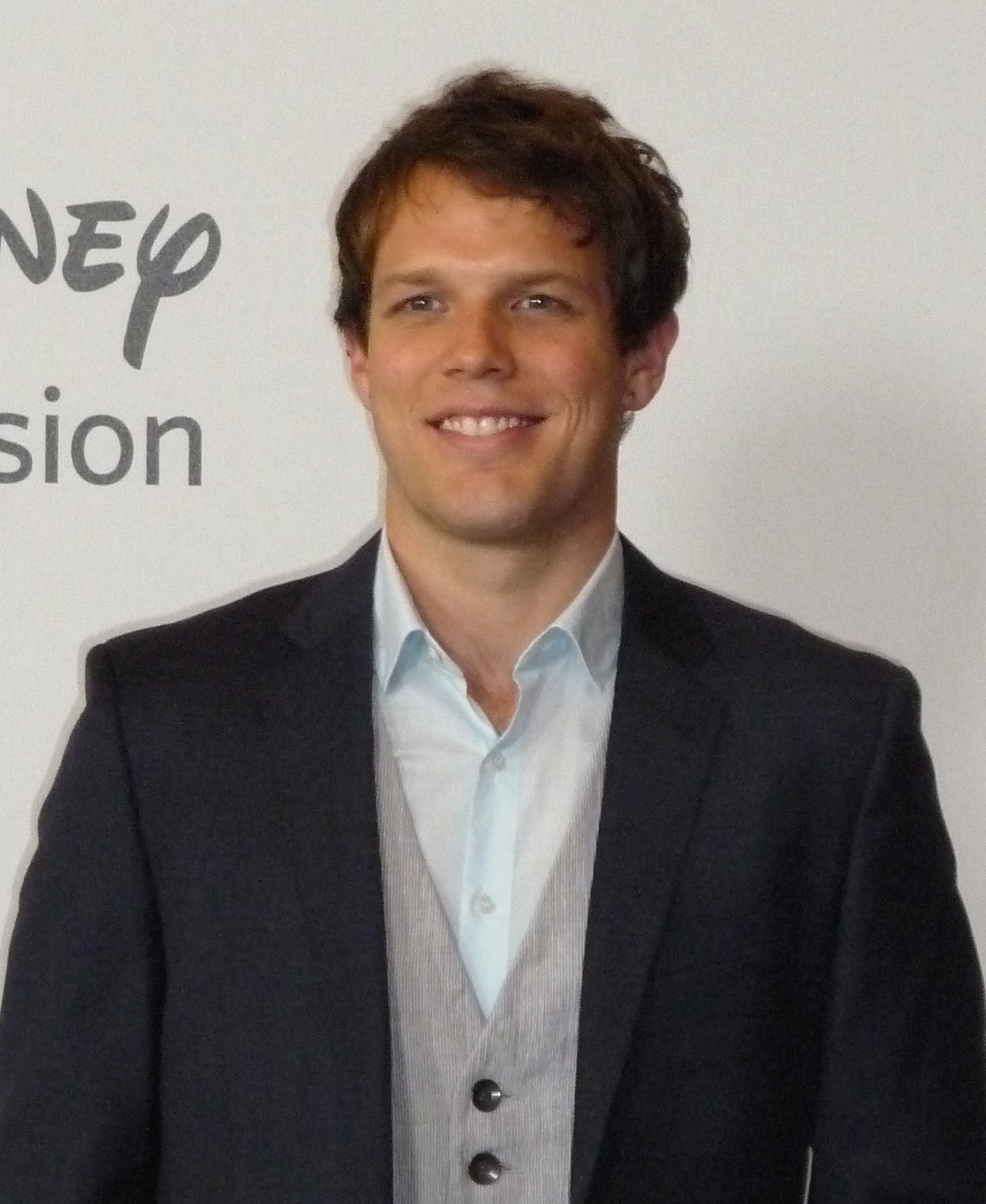
The season saw the addition of Clark Duke (left) and Jake Lacy (right) to The Office.
- Catherine Tate as Nellie Bertram, the manager of special projects.
- Leslie David Baker as Stanley Hudson, a grumpy salesman.
- Brian Baumgartner as Kevin Malone, a dim-witted accountant
- Creed Bratton as Creed Bratton, the office’s strange quality assurance officer.
- Clark Duke as Clark Green, one of the two new customer sales representatives hired to replace Ryan and Kelly, who wants to become a salesman.
- Kate Flannery as Meredith Palmer, the promiscuous supplier relations representative.
- Mindy Kaling as Kelly Kapoor, the pop-culture obsessed customer service representative, who leaves with her fiancé, Ravi, at the beginning of the season.
- Ellie Kemper as Erin Hannon, the receptionist and love interest of Andy.
- Angela Kinsey as Angela Martin, a judgemental accountant.
- Jake Lacy as Pete Miller, one of the two new customer sales representatives hired to replace Ryan and Kelly. He develops feelings for Erin.
- Paul Lieberstein as Toby Flenderson, the sad-eyed human resources representative.
- B. J. Novak as Ryan Howard, a former temporary worker, who leaves and follows Kelly to Ohio at the beginning of the season.
- Oscar Nunez as Oscar Martinez, an intelligent accountant, who is also gay.
- Craig Robinson as Darryl Philbin, the warehouse manager, who starts working with Jim at his new company.
- Phyllis Smith as Phyllis Vance, a motherly saleswoman.

=== Special guest star ===
- Steve Carell as Michael Scott, the former regional manager of the Scranton branch, who is now happily married to Holly Flax in Colorado. He returns to be Dwight's best man.
- Melora Hardin as Jan Levinson, a former Dunder Mifflin employee, now working at the Scranton White Pages.

=== Recurring ===
- Jack Coleman as Robert Lipton, Angela's husband and a state senator.
- Ameenah Kaplan as Val Johnson, a warehouse worker and Darryl's girlfriend.
- Bobby Ray Shafer as Bob Vance, the owner of Vance Refrigeration and Phyllis' husband.
- Andy Buckley as David Wallace, the owner and CEO of Dunder Mifflin.
- Hugh Dane as Hank Tate, the building's security guard.
- Chris Diamantopoulos as Brian, a boom mic operator.
- Michael Schur as Mose Schrute, Dwight's cousin.
- Matt L. Jones as Ziek Schrute, Dwight's cousin and Mose's brother.
- Nora Kirkpatrick as Esther Breugger, Dwight's girlfriend.

=== Notable guests ===
- David Denman as Roy Anderson, a former warehouse worker and Pam's ex-fiancé.
- Randall Park as Steve, an Asian actor pretending to be Jim.
- Stephen Colbert as Broccoli Rob, a former member of Here Comes Treble, Andy's a cappella group.
- Josh Groban as Walter Bernard Jr., Andy's brother.
- Sam Richardson as Colin, an employee at Athlead in Philadelphia.
- Julius Erving as himself
- Ed Lauter as Sam Stone Sr., the owner of a suit warehouse.
- Linda Purl as Helene Beesly, Pam's mother.
- Bob Odenkirk as Mark Franks, a real estate office manager in Philadelphia.
- Michael Weston as Roger, a worker at a real estate office in Philadelphia.
- Zach Woods as Gabe Lewis, a former Sabre employee and Erin's ex-boyfriend, who was fired after the Sabre's liquidation.
- Collette Wolfe as Alice, Pete's ex-girlfriend.
- Majandra Delfino as Fannie Schrute, Dwight's sister.
- Thomas Middleditch as Jeb Schrute, Dwight's brother.
- David Koechner as Todd Packer, a rude and offensive man and a former employee of Dunder Mifflin Sabre, who was fired by Robert California.
- Ryan Howard as himself
- Roseanne Barr as Carla Fern, Andy's agent.
- Clay Aiken as himself
- Mark McGrath as himself
- Aaron Rodgers as himself
- Santigold as herself
- Ed Begley Jr. as Martin Hannon, Erin's biological father.
- Joan Cusack as Fran Hannon, Erin's biological mother.
- Dakota Johnson as Dakota, an accountant hired to replace Kevin.
- Devon Abner as Devon White, a former Dunder Mifflin Employee who was fired by Michael.
- Nancy Carell as Carol Stills, a real estate agent.

=== Casting ===
Krasinski and Helms were expected to appear in fewer episodes in order to film several upcoming movies. Helms was temporarily written out of the series with a storyline that saw his character travel to the Caribbean with his brother on a boat. As such, Helms made only a small appearance in "The Whale" and was absent from the following eight episodes. He returned in the episode "Couples Discount". According to TVLine, he returned to work right before the show's Christmas break. Krasinski ultimately continued to appear in every episode, but was frequently absent from the primary Scranton setting as part of a storyline that saw Jim begin a start-up business in Philadelphia. Additionally, Wilson was initially slated to appear in only 13 episodes before leaving for a planned Dwight-centric spin-off, but the spin-off was not picked up by NBC. Mindy Kaling and B. J. Novak have much lesser roles as Kelly Kapoor and Ryan Howard, respectively. Both Kaling and Novak appeared in the season opener "New Guys", and both returned for the series finale. Actress Catherine Tate, who joined the series as a series regular midway through season eight portraying Nellie Bertram, continued with the series. Clark Duke and Lacy joined the cast as customer service representatives hired to deal with the many neglected customer service complaints Kelly has amassed over the years; Lacy's character, Pete, is also a love interest for Erin.

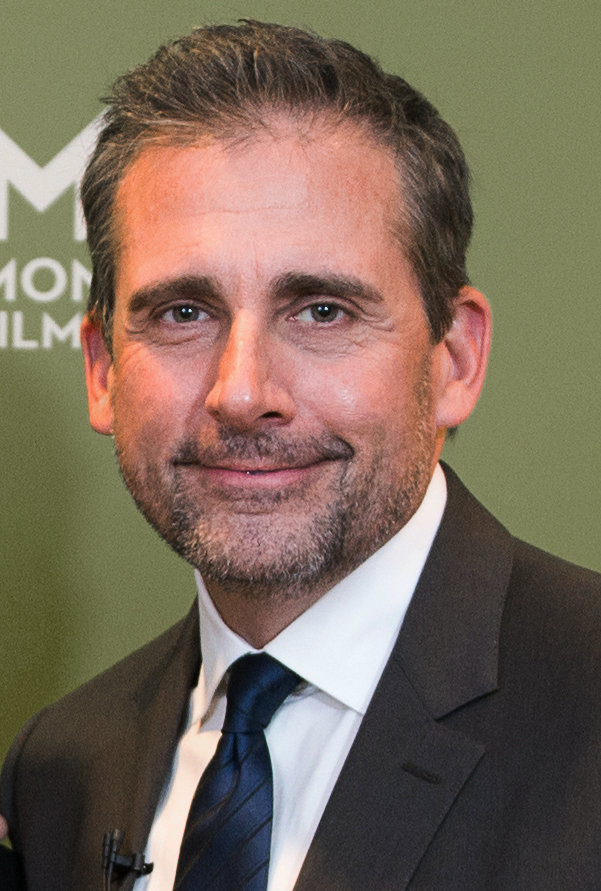
Former star Steve Carell reprised his role as Michael Scott in "Finale".

Kinsey and Wilson also noted that the cast and crew could neither "confirm nor deny" but were "hoping" for a return of Steve Carell as Michael Scott. In mid-December, Krasinski later revealed that he was optimistic about a return; in an interview with E! Online Krasinski said that the producers were supposedly "still trying to figure out [Carell's] schedule" and that the finale "just wouldn't be the same without him". However, NBC chairman Robert Greenblatt later admitted during an interview that while he is "hopeful", he does not think Carell will return; he noted that Carell was satisfied with his character's exit and did not want to tarnish it. On January 16, Daniels revealed that Carell would not appear in the finale in any capacity, a decision that Carell later reiterated. Three months later, however, the producers for The Office mounted "an 11th-hour effort last month" to get Carell to make a cameo in the show's final episode, according to TVLine. Carell's personal representative confirmed that Carell was on the set for the final episode, but that he did not film any scenes. However, an anonymous source "close to the show" said "don't rule anything out". TVLine later reported on May 6, that Carell would appear in a cameo, although NBC declined to comment and Carell's representatives continued to deny the reports. Carell, however, did end up returning for the finale; his character, Michael Scott, becomes Dwight's best man at his wedding. A month after the episode aired, Carell explained in an interview with TVLine that he "lied for months to the press, to almost everyone, really". He noted that he "felt terribly for the cast and for [executive producer] Greg Daniels, because they all lied, too." Krasinski, on the other hand, explained that "It was so thrilling. We all just flat-out lied … It was just one of those things that we all vowed and had to protect".

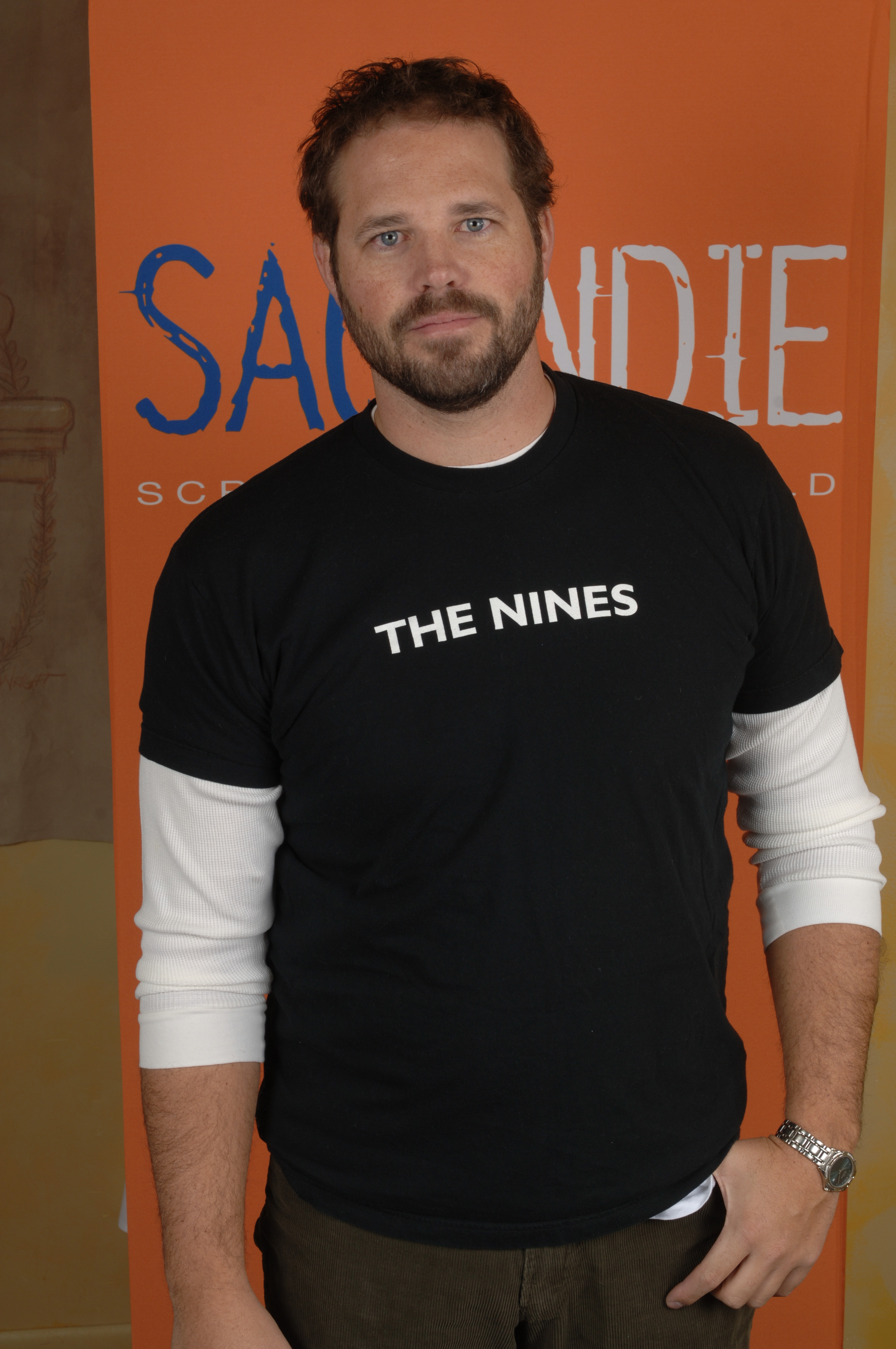
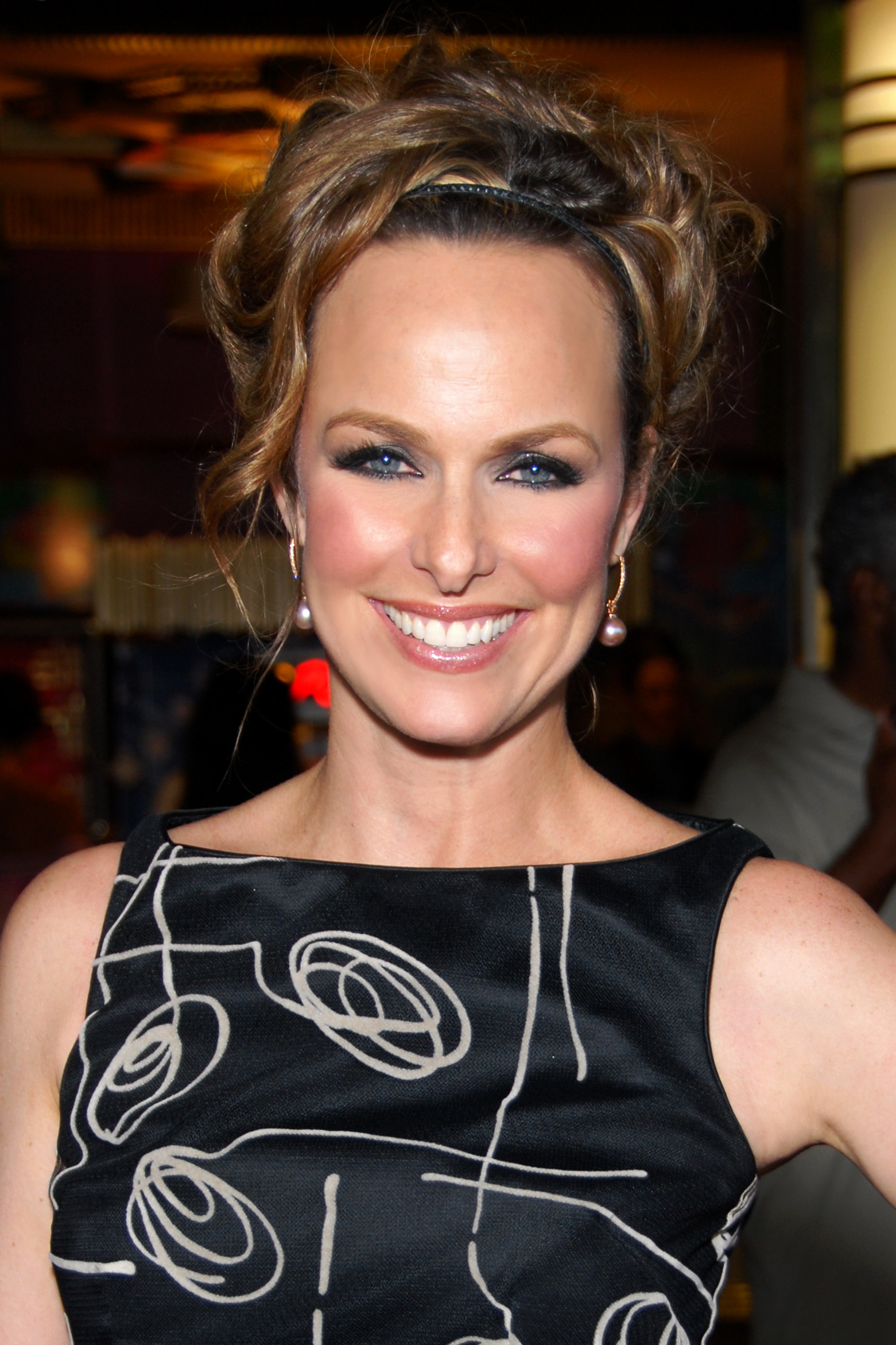
Several former cast members returned for guest appearances, including David Denman (left) and Melora Hardin (right).

In addition to Carell, the season also saw the return of several "veteran cast members". Former series regular David Denman was the first to do so, appearing as Roy Anderson in the second episode of the season "Roy's Wedding"; he was last seen as part of the Threat Level Midnight film in season seven. Josh Groban reprised his role as Andy's brother, Walter Jr, appearing in the episode "The Boat". Melora Hardin returned as Jan Levinson in the episode "The Whale" and had a small vocal cameo in the episode "Couples Discount". "Junior Salesman" saw the return of several minor characters, including Lance Krall as Sensei Ira (who first appeared in the second-season episode "The Fight"), Noel Petok as Troy Underbridge (who first appeared in the fourth-season episode "Night Out"), Beth Grant as Dwight's babysitter (who first appeared in the fourth-season episode "Dinner Party"), and James Urbaniak as Rolf (who first appeared in the fifth-season episode "Company Picnic"). Although cast member Zach Woods' series regular contract was not renewed for the season, he returned to the series as a guest star, in the episode "Moving On". David Koechner returned as Todd Packer in "The Farm". "Finale" also featured the return of several recurring characters, such as Nancy Carell as Carol Stills, Michael's real-estate agent and short-time girlfriend, Sendhil Ramamurthy as Ravi, Jackie Debatin as Elizabeth (who first appeared in the third season episode "Ben Franklin"), Devon Abner as Devon (who was a former Dunder Mifflin employee fired in "Halloween"), and Spencer Daniels as Jake Palmer (who first played Meredith's son in the season two episode "Take Your Daughter to Work Day").

Stephen Colbert guest starred in the Halloween episode as Broccoli Rob, a former member of Here Comes Treble, Andy's a cappella group. The episode "Lice" guest starred Julius Erving playing himself as an investor in Jim's sports marketing business. Former NBC co-chairman and The Office executive producer Ben Silverman had a minor recurring role as one of Jim's colleagues. He appeared in the episodes "Here Comes Treble", "Suit Warehouse", "Customer Loyalty", and "Moving On". The fourteenth episode, "Junior Salesmen", featured several guest stars. These included Eric Wareheim as Gabor, Matt L. Jones as Zeke, and Will McCormack as Wolf. In the episode "Promos", athlete Ryan Howard played a version of himself. Comedian Roseanne Barr had a two-episode arc as a talent agent named Carla Fern, and first appeared in the episode "Stairmageddon". Michael Imperioli guest starred in the episode "Livin' the Dream" as Sensei Billy, acting as a foil for Dwight. The episode "A.A.R.M." guest starred Aaron Rodgers, Clay Aiken, Mark McGrath, Santigold, and Jessica St. Clair, all playing themselves. The series finale guest starred: Rachael Harris as Angela's sister; Joan Cusack and Ed Begley Jr. as Erin's biological parents; Malcolm Barrett as Stanley's replacement; and Bill Hader and Seth Meyers as themselves.

== Reception ==
=== Ratings ===
Ratings for each episode of The Office that aired this season.^{i}

The season aired on Thursdays at 9:00 p.m., as part of the Comedy Night Done Right programming block. The season premiere, "New Guys" received a 2.1/6 percent share in the Nielsen ratings among viewers aged 18 to 49, meaning that 2.1 percent of viewers aged 18 to 49 watched the episode, and 6 percent of viewers watching television at the time watched the episode. The episode was viewed by 4.28 million viewers and became the lowest-rated season premiere for the series. In addition, it marked a 46 percent drop in viewership from the season eight premiere "The List". For the first sixteen episodes, the series was able to maintain roughly 4 million viewers. However, starting with the seventeenth episode "The Farm", ratings began to drop below this threshold. The series hit an all-time low with the twentieth episode, "Paper Airplane", which was viewed by only 3.25 million viewers, and received a 1.7 rating/5 percent share. The series finale was viewed by 5.69 million viewers and received a 3.0 rating among adults between the ages of 18 and 49. This made it the highest-rated episode of the season; it also marked an increase in the previous season finale, which garnered only 4.49 million viewers. "Finale" was the most watched episode of The Office since the eighth season episode "Pool Party", but ranked as the third-least watched finale of the series, following the eighth- and first-season finales.

By this season, The Office was no longer NBC's highest-rated scripted comedy series (having been surpassed by Go On), it still often ranked as the highest-rated scripted NBC series on Thursday nights.^{i} Rainn Wilson argued that the show's lower ratings were a combination of the overall trend in lower television ratings in 2012, as well as the fact that "NBC didn't promote [the series] one bit". NBC increased their usual ad-price by 200 percent for the finale, asking for $400,000 per commercial. This was largely due to the anticipated increase in viewership that the finale would bring.

The season ranked as the ninety-fourth most watched television series during the 2012–13 season, with an average of 5.061 million viewers. The season also tied with the CBS series Rules of Engagement and the Fox series American Dad! to be the forty-third most watched television series in the 18- to 49-year-old demographic. In this category, the show received a 2.6 rating. This meant that, on average, the season was viewed by 2.6 percent of all 18- to 49-year-olds. It was viewed by 3.32 million in this demographic. In terms of viewers, the ninth season ranked as the lowest-rated season of The Office, although it beat the first season's ranking, which was the 102nd most watched program for the 2004–05 year.

=== Critical response ===
The ninth season of The Office received moderately positive reviews from television critics. Based on seven critiques, review aggregation website Metacritic gave the ninth season of the show a 64 out of 100 rating, which denotes "generally favorable" reviews. Entertainment website Holy Moly named the series one of the best shows during the 2012–13 season, writing that "this final season of The Office has been great" largely due to the fact that "every single relationship in the show rings true with the audience." Michael Tedder of Vulture commented that he was "willing to call it the fourth best season of the show overall, which is by no means faint praise." He explained that this was largely due to the fact that the "final season was a chance to see how everyone else would end up". Emily St. James of The A.V. Club wrote that "the tension between Jim and Pam in the final season ended up being highly controversial for a number of reasons ... but it also provided the most hopeful moments of the series' final stretch" (although she did note that it was clear that the writers had "blatantly" set up the drama). She concluded that the finale was able to successfully return the series "to what had always been its heart—to have true fulfillment". Roth Cornet of IGN awarded the season an 8.5 out of 10, denoting a "great" year. She felt that the character growth in the final few episodes was particularly well executed, and the last stretch of the season helped raise it after a rocky start; ultimately, she felt that the writers were able to craft the proper ending for the show. She was, however, critical of Andy's characterization, noting that he was merely used as a plot device when convenient. Many critics argued that the season was an improvement, in both writing and humor, over the previous season.

Several specific episodes received praise. Andrea Reiher of Zap2it named "Dwight Christmas" the best comedy TV episode of 2012. She wrote that the episode "was not only funny but had a huge nostalgia factor", and continued the show's trend of strong Christmas episodes. Reiher also praised the episode's two subplots, writing that "drunk Darryl and Die Hard" helped produce "a classic episode of The Office that brought back the warm and fuzzy feelings of the early seasons of the show." The season's penultimate entry, "A.A.R.M.", received a glowing response from many critics. Alan Sepinwall of HitFix wrote that the episode was "surprisingly ... terrific in most areas." Roth Cornet of IGN noted that "The interplay between Jim, Dwight, and Pam has been the core of the series since Michael Scott's departure, and it was good to see the trio front and center once again as The Office comes to a close." The series finale, in particular, was praised by critics. Sepinwall called it "a tremendously satisfying conclusion to a show that could make us gasp with laughter, but that could also make us cry or smile". Cornet wrote that it "was a strong hour of television [and] the finale shone and delivered on all of its promise." Nick Campbell of TV.com wrote that the episode was "just right" for the series. Other episodes were not received as positively. "Lice", for instance, was called "terrible" by Campbell, as well as the "epitome of filler" by Brett Davinger of The California Literary Review. "The Farm" was largely derided due to its uneven nature, and the broad humor that it used.

The reveal of the in-series documentary crew in "Customer Loyalty" received large amounts of critical attention. E! Online named the reveal one of the "Best TV Moments of the Week". Verne Gay of Newsday called the scene a "historic" moment for the show. Conversely, Myles McNutt of The A.V. Club wrote an article that argued that the mockumentary format made the camera "an audience surrogate", and that by revealing the documentary crew, "the audience no longer felt welcome". The subplot involving Brian (played by Chris Diamantopoulos), a boom mic operator for the in-series documentary, was met with mostly negative reviews. Michael Tedder of Vulture called it "the least interesting way this camera crew reveal could have gone". Dan Forcella of TV Fanatic criticized the reintroduction of the character in the episode "Promos", noting that his reappearance felt "forced". McNutt called it "an abandoned novelty". Daniels later revealed in an interview that the subplot was a red herring to keep viewers emotionally invested in Pam and Jim's story. He explained, "we never intended him to actually [interfere with Pam and Jim's marriage], but wanted people to worry about it so they would be engaged in the story."

=== Awards ===
On December 12, 2012, the series was nominated for a Screen Actors Guild Award for Outstanding Performance by an Ensemble in a Comedy Series, but lost to Modern Family. Michael Scott's return was nominated and won the fan-voted "Best TV Moment" at the 3rd Critics' Choice Television Awards on June 10, 2013. Greg Daniels was nominated for a Primetime Emmy Award for Outstanding Writing for a Comedy Series at the 65th Primetime Emmy Awards for "Finale". "Finale" was also nominated for an Outstanding Sound Mixing for a Comedy or Drama Series Emmy and an Outstanding Single-Camera Picture Editing for a Comedy Series Emmy; David Rogers and Claire Scanlon for "Finale" won the latter, marking the fifth win for The Office at the Emmys overall and the series' first win since 2009. Rogers and Scanlon also won an American Cinema Editors award for Best Edited Half-Hour Series for Television. In addition, the web documentary "The Office: The Farewells", which aired on NBC.com prior to the series' conclusion, was nominated for an Outstanding Special Class Program Creative Arts Emmy Award.

== Episodes ==
In the following table, "U.S. viewers (million)" refers to the number of Americans who viewed the episode on the night of broadcast. Episodes are listed by the order in which they aired, and may not necessarily correspond to their production codes.

No. overall	No. in season	Title	Directed by	Written by	Original release date	Prod. code	U.S. viewers (millions)
177	1	"New Guys"	Greg Daniels	Greg Daniels	September 20, 2012	9001	4.28
Two new employees, Clark (Clark Duke) and Pete (Jake Lacy), are hired by the Scranton branch and cause trouble for Jim Halpert (John Krasinski) and Dwight Schrute (Rainn Wilson). Andy Bernard (Ed Helms) returns from manager training, hoping for revenge on Nellie Bertram (Catherine Tate). Oscar Martinez (Oscar Nunez) considers adopting Angela Martin's (Angela Kinsey) cat. Kevin Malone (Brian Baumgartner) "saves" a turtle. Kelly Kapoor (Mindy Kaling) leaves for Ohio, and Ryan Howard (B. J. Novak) follows after her.
178	2	"Roy's Wedding"	Matt Sohn	Allison Silverman	September 27, 2012	9002	4.13
Jim and Pam Halpert (Jenna Fischer) are invited to Pam's former fiancé Roy Anderson's (David Denman) wedding. A toast that Roy gives leads Pam and Jim to search their relationships for buried secrets. Meanwhile, Dwight reacts to Nellie's mandatory charity initiative by maintaining that he will donate the money he raises to the Taliban, and Clark hits on Erin Hannon (Ellie Kemper) by dangling a fake newscaster job, but Andy takes the bait.
179	3	"Andy's Ancestry"	David Rogers	Jonathan Green & Gabe Miller	October 4, 2012	9003	4.14
Andy brags about his discovery that he is related to First Lady Michelle Obama. Darryl Philbin (Craig Robinson) finds his new job as Assistant Regional Manager difficult. Dwight attempts to teach Erin the Dothraki language from the HBO television series Game of Thrones so that she can impress Andy's educated family. Nellie and Pam bond, and Nellie tells Pam that Jim may be having an affair. Meanwhile, Jim reveals his plans of moving to Philadelphia to Darryl in the warehouse.
180	4	"Work Bus"	Bryan Cranston	Brent Forrester	October 18, 2012	9004	4.28
When Jim convinces Dwight that the building is unsafe due to a radiation leak, Dwight rents a bus and sets up the office inside. Meanwhile, Nellie asks Andy for a letter of recommendation in order to adopt a baby; Erin, meanwhile, gives her pointers on how to fill out a proper application for adoption. Jim tries to make Pam happy with some pie.
181	5	"Here Comes Treble"	Claire Scanlon	Owen Ellickson	October 25, 2012	9006	4.00
After inviting his former college a cappella group, Here Comes Treble, to perform for the office during Halloween, Andy gets angry when he hears that his college friend Broccoli Rob (Stephen Colbert) is telling a different story about the group. Dwight tries to track down a madman in the office; Jim and Pam fight over his new job.
182	6	"The Boat"	John Krasinski	Dan Sterling	November 8, 2012	9007	4.83
Andy must help his family when his dad loses all of their money. Meanwhile, Dwight is a guest on a radio show, and his co-workers call in to bother him. Kevin learns a secret about Oscar. This episode features the return of Andy's brother Walter Jr. (Josh Groban), who is now a drunk.
183	7	"The Whale"	Rodman Flender	Carrie Kemper	November 15, 2012	9008	4.16
Dwight is tasked with selling paper to an unknown woman—revealed to be Jan Levinson (Melora Hardin)—from the Scranton White Pages, and Pam and the women of the office teach him how to interact with women. Angela fears that her husband, Robert (Jack Coleman), is cheating on her and enlists Oscar to help her spy on him at his yoga class. Meanwhile, Andy skypes into the office from his boat and Toby (Paul Lieberstein) convinces several of the men in the office to grow mustaches for "Movember".
184	8	"The Target"	Brent Forrester	Graham Wagner	November 29, 2012	9009	3.88
Angela goes to Dwight for help when she learns that her husband is having an affair with Oscar. Stanley Hudson (Leslie David Baker) and Phyllis Vance (Phyllis Smith) take advantage of Jim when he needs a favor, and Pete distracts Pam as she begins painting her mural.
185	9	"Dwight Christmas"	Charles McDougall	Robert Padnick	December 6, 2012	9010	4.16
When the party planning committee forgets to plan the annual Christmas party, Dwight gets everyone to celebrate with a traditional Pennsylvania Dutch Christmas. Darryl fears that Jim has forgotten to include him in the new job in Philadelphia. Pete teaches Erin about his favorite movie Die Hard. Toby discusses the Scranton Strangler trial with Nellie.
186	10	"Lice"	Rodman Flender	Niki Schwartz-Wright	January 10, 2013	9011	4.54
Pam accidentally brings lice into the office but lets Meredith Palmer (Kate Flannery) take the fall while Dwight vows to destroy the parasites; Jim spends a great day in Philadelphia with a potential business associate (Julius Erving); Nellie, Phyllis, and Kevin interfere with Darryl's love life.
187	11	"Suit Warehouse"	Matt Sohn	Dan Greaney	January 17, 2013	9012	4.15
Clark returns from his stint as Jan's sexual assistant and Dwight enlists his help; the two pose as a father and son so that they can successfully sell to the owner of a suit warehouse. Darryl travels to Philadelphia with Pam to interview at Jim's new company; after a mixed interview, Darryl gets the job. Meanwhile, Pam starts to realize that her family may have to leave Scranton.
188	12	"Customer Loyalty"	Kelly Cantley	Jonathan Green & Gabe Miller	January 24, 2013	9013	4.19
Jim is forced to miss Cece's first recital after a major investor exits his company. Dwight tries to prevent Darryl from leaving the office. Nellie accidentally outs Pete and Erin. Jim is upset with Pam because of her failure to record Cece's recital, but the argument quickly escalates into a major fight about Jim's business venture. Boom mic operator Brian (Chris Diamantopoulos) enters the shot to comfort a distressed Pam.
189	13	"Junior Salesman"	David Rogers	Carrie Kemper	January 31, 2013	9014	4.45
Dunder Mifflin CEO David Wallace (Andy Buckley) tasks Dwight with finding a part-time replacement for Jim; Dwight in turn enlists several of his close friends, including his cousin Mose (Michael Schur). Pam tries to find out who her new desk mate will be.
190	14	"Vandalism"	Lee Kirk	Owen Ellickson	January 31, 2013	9015	3.97
Someone vandalizes Pam's warehouse mural. Distraught, she seeks the help of Dwight and Nellie, who both eagerly help her track down the vandal. Meanwhile, in their Philadelphia apartment, Darryl is uncomfortable with Jim's uncleanliness. Angela begrudgingly allows Oscar and Kevin to attend her son Phillip's first birthday party.
191	15	"Couples Discount"	Troy Miller	Allison Silverman	February 7, 2013	9016	4.15
The office pairs into couples so that they may all be able to take advantage of a Valentine's Day discount at a mini-mall. After Andy returns from his boat trip, Erin decides that she is going to break up with him so that she can be with Pete, but Pete begins to doubt her. Pam and Jim share lunch with Brian, the documentary's sound man.
192	16	"Moving On"^{‡}	Jon Favreau	Graham Wagner	February 14, 2013	9017	4.06
Pam interviews for a job in Philadelphia, but her potential manager (Bob Odenkirk) reminds her of her former boss, Michael Scott. Dwight acquires the help of Angela in order to give his elderly Aunt Shirley (Mary Gillis) a bath. Meanwhile, Andy attempts to make Pete and Erin feel uncomfortable.
193	17	"The Farm"	Paul Lieberstein	Paul Lieberstein	March 14, 2013	9005	3.54
Oscar attends the funeral of Dwight's Aunt Shirley at Schrute Farms. Dwight's sister Fannie (Majandra Delfino) and brother Jeb (Thomas Middleditch) also attend and Shirley stipulates in her will that they are set to inherit her farm only if they choose to live and work it themselves. Todd Packer (David Koechner) returns to the office to make amends as part of an alcoholic and narcotics recovery process but instead hands out cupcakes laced with laxatives and drugs.
194	18	"Promos"	Jennifer Celotta	Tim McAuliffe	April 4, 2013	9018	3.44
Everyone in the office is excited when international promos for the documentary surface, but are soon horrified to discover how much candid filming has taken place. While everyone panics about their secrets being revealed, Pam reflects upon how much she and Jim have changed over the past nine years. Dwight makes Angela jealous when he starts dating a Brussels sprout farmer, who Clark suspects may be trying to lure Dwight into a scam. Andy battles rude comments on the Internet. Meanwhile, Jim and Darryl have a big meeting with Major League baseball player, Ryan Howard, who pitches a bizarre sci-fi sports movie about himself.
195	19	"Stairmageddon"	Matt Sohn	Dan Sterling	April 11, 2013	9019	3.83
The elevators are under maintenance and the office workers have to walk up the stairs, a situation everyone deems the "Stairmageddon". Exhausted after climbing the stairs, Stanley refuses to go back down in order to close a sale with one of their bigger clients. Dwight is forced to shoot Stanley with a few bull tranquillizer darts to knock him out. Dwight and Clark then take a drugged Stanley on the sales call. Pam and Jim spend time talking with Nellie and Toby respectively about their marital troubles and couples counselling. Angela attends a press conference with the senator, who outs himself as gay on television and reveals his relationship with his chief of staff, shocking both her and Oscar in the process. Andy meets with a talent agent named Carla Fern (Roseanne Barr).
196	20	"Paper Airplane"	Jesse Peretz	Halsted Sullivan & Warren Lieberstein	April 25, 2013	9020	3.25
Dwight and Angela participate in a paper airplane contest and compete against each other. Meanwhile, Andy prepares for a potential acting job, and Jim and Pam utilize new skills that they learned in couples counseling. Roseanne Barr guest stars in this episode as well.
197	21	"Livin' the Dream"^{‡}	Jeffrey Blitz	Niki Schwartz-Wright	May 2, 2013	9021	3.51
Andy decides to pursue a career as a professional actor, and quits his job at Dunder Mifflin. Meanwhile, Dwight finally receives his black belt in karate from his new sensei (Michael Imperioli) and, on the behest of Jim, is promoted to Regional Manager of the Scranton branch. Jim, who reconnects with Pam, is promoted by Dwight to be the new Assistant to the Regional Manager and makes it clear that he will choose her over Philadelphia. Angela is evicted from her apartment and temporarily moves in with Oscar, to whom she confesses her love for Dwight.
198	22	"A.A.R.M."^{‡}	David Rogers	Brent Forrester	May 9, 2013	9022	4.56
199	23	"A.A.R.M."^{‡}	David Rogers	Brent Forrester	May 9, 2013	9023	4.56
Jim convinces Dwight that he needs to choose someone to act as an Assistant to the Assistant to the Regional Manager; the two subsequently hold tryouts for the position. After her daycare turns away her child, Angela is forced to bring her kid to work. Andy auditions for "The Next Great A Cappella Sensation". This episode guest stars Aaron Rodgers, Clay Aiken, Mark McGrath, Santigold, and Jessica St. Clair.
200	24	"Finale"^{*}	Ken Kwapis	Greg Daniels	May 16, 2013	9024	5.69
201	25	"Finale"^{*}	Ken Kwapis	Greg Daniels	May 16, 2013	9025	5.69
One year after the airing of the documentary, past and present employees of Dunder Mifflin gather for Dwight and Angela's wedding. Dwight initially chooses Jim to be his best man, but Michael Scott (Steve Carell) shows up and takes his place. Finally, everyone comes together for a final round of interviews, and are brought to tears. The episode guest stars Steve Carell, Rachael Harris, Dakota Johnson, Joan Cusack, Sendhil Ramamurthy, Ed Begley, Jr., Malcolm Barrett, Matt L. Jones, Bill Hader, Seth Meyers, and Nancy Carell.

== Home media release ==
The ninth season of The Office was released by Universal Studios Home Entertainment as a five-disc set on both Region 1 DVD and a Region A Blu-ray on September 3, 2013. The set contains all 25 episodes of the season presented in a 1.78:1 widescreen aspect ratio with Dolby Digital audio and optional English and Spanish subtitles. The release also includes a variety of deleted scenes, 2003 casting tapes, "The Office: A Look Back" Retrospective featurette, a table read of the "Finale" script, the "Autotune Andy" music video. The Blu-ray release also contains an exclusive "Behind-the-Scenes Panel Discussion".

== Explanatory notes ==
^‡ denotes an hour-long episode (with advertisements; actual runtime around 42 minutes).
^* denotes an extended 75-minute episode (with advertisements; actual runtime around 52 minutes).
^i Information on individual episode ratings can be found in the "Episodes" section.
