= Andy's Ancestry =

- The Office episode
- Episode no.: Season 9 Episode 3
- Directed by: David Rogers
- Written by: Jonathan Green; Gabe Miller
- Cinematography by: Matt Sohn
- Editing by: David Rogers
- Production code: 9003
- Original air date: October 4, 2012
- Running time: 22 minutes

Guest appearance
- Randall Park as Steve

Episode chronology
← Previous "Roy's Wedding"	Next → "Work Bus"
- The Office (American season 9)

"Andy's Ancestry" is the third episode of the ninth season of the American comedy television series The Office. The episode originally aired on NBC on October 4, 2012. The episode was written by Jonathan Green and Gabe Miller, and was directed by David Rogers. The episode guest stars Randall Park as Jim and Pam's actor friend, Steve.

The series depicts the everyday lives of office employees in the Scranton, Pennsylvania branch of the fictional Dunder Mifflin Paper Company. In this episode, Andy Bernard (Ed Helms) brags about his discovery that he is related to First Lady Michelle Obama. Darryl Philbin (Craig Robinson) finds his new job as Assistant Regional Manager difficult. Dwight Schrute (Rainn Wilson) attempts to teach Erin Hannon (Ellie Kemper) the Dothraki language from HBO series Game of Thrones so that she can impress Andy's educated family. Nellie Bertram (Catherine Tate) tells Pam Halpert (Jenna Fischer) that Jim Halpert (John Krasinski) may be having an affair; meanwhile, Jim reveals his entrepreneurial plans to Darryl Philbin (Craig Robinson) in the warehouse.

"Andy's Ancestry" received moderately positive reviews from television critics. Many felt that the emotional elements in the episode were effective and that the cold opening was particularly humorous, and noted that the episode bore stylistic similarities to early episodes of the show. Some, however, were slightly disappointed by the episode's various subplots. "Andy's Ancestry" was viewed by 4.14 million viewers and received a 2.2 rating among adults between the age of 18 and 49. The episode ranked fourth in its timeslot and was also the highest-rated NBC series of the night.

== Synopsis ==
In the cold open, an Asian man arrives at the office and sits at Jim Halpert's desk, saying good morning to Dwight. Dwight Schrute, not knowing the man, asks who he is. The man claims to be the real Jim, and offers proof: he is able to recall his last sales, he knows his voicemail password, he kisses Pam Halpert, and he has a picture of Pam and himself and their two half-Asian children. Dwight is confused, but Pam explains in a talking head that Jim is at the dentist, and that the man is an actor friend of Jim and Pam's named Steve.

Andy Bernard demands that Nellie Bertram research his family tree. To spite him, she falsely tells him that he is related to U.S. First Lady Michelle Obama. He begins to brag about his discovery, which causes his co-workers to wonder if Andy's family ever owned slaves. In order to get back at his co-workers, Andy asks Nellie to "dig up dirt" on the rest of the office. In turn, she and Pam make up more fake facts as a prank. Jim realizes this prank when Andy "reveals" Jim is related to Richard Nixon, an inside joke between Jim and Pam. It is later revealed by Andy's mother that the Bernards never owned slaves: they simply transported them.

Pam has been helping Nellie practice for a driving test. The two bond after Nellie shows appreciation for Pam's art. After telling her that she is worried that her husband Jim is not telling her something, Nellie immediately states that Jim is probably having an affair, a nod to Nellie's former partner and the cause of their breakup. Nellie later asks Pam to paint a mural in the warehouse.

Darryl Philbin has been promoted to Assistant Regional Manager and as a result is inspired to find ways to be more productive, for himself and the office. However, his ideas for the office are ignored by Andy, leading to a discussion with Jim in the warehouse about their increasing dissatisfaction with Dunder Mifflin. Jim tells Darryl about his sports marketing job opportunity in Philadelphia and offers him a possible position. However, as Jim has yet to tell Pam, Darryl says he should before going forward. When Pam comes back, Jim reveals the job opportunity to Pam, who, despite giving her approval, is upset that Jim did not consult her beforehand.

Dwight attempts to teach Erin Hannon the Dothraki language from the HBO series Game of Thrones so that she can impress Andy's educated family, with Erin being unaware that it is a fictional language. Andy, however, points this out, leaving Erin dejected. However, as the office leaves for the day, Pete Miller gives Erin a Dothraki farewell.

== Production ==
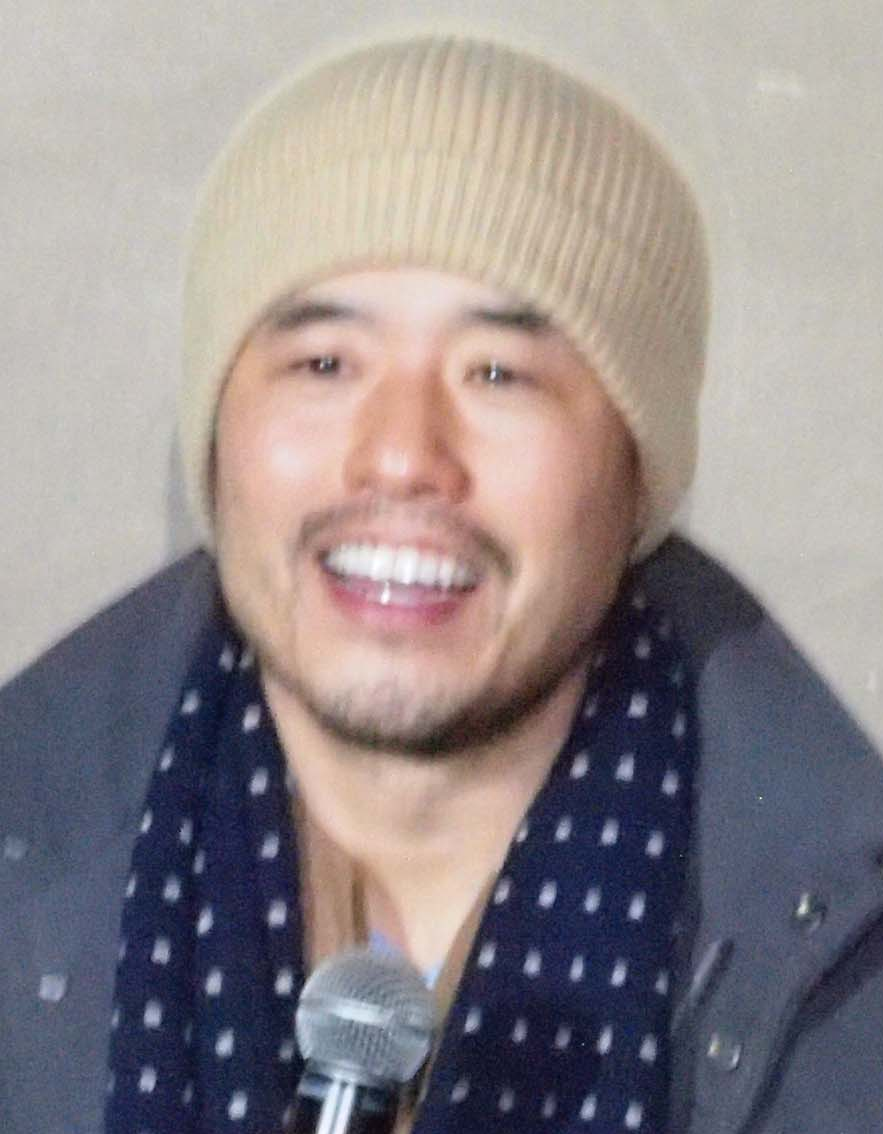
This episode guest stars Randall Park as Jim and Pam's friend Steve.

"Andy's Ancestry" was written by co-executive producers Jonathan Green and Gabe Miller, making it their first joint writing credit for the series. The episode was directed by series editor David Rogers. This was Rogers' seventh directing credit for the series, he previously directed the seventh season entry "Ultimatum". The episode guest stars Randall Park as Jim and Pam's actor friend. After the release of the episode's plot synopsis, Geni.com, a genealogy and social networking website, claimed that Ed Helms is in fact Michelle Obama's 18th cousin once removed. The NBC website later produced the "real" Bernard family tree after the release of the full episode.

== Cultural references ==
Dwight attempts to teach the Dothraki language from the popular book series A Song of Ice and Fire by George R. R. Martin. The books had also been turned into the HBO fantasy series Game of Thrones. Dwight later compares learning Dothraki to learning Klingon, a fictional language from franchise Star Trek. Andy refers to Ladysmith Black Mambazo as "Ladysmith African-American Mambazo" in an attempt to prove he is not racist. Kevin Malone (Brian Baumgartner) later changes Andy's ringtone to the song "Dixie".

After Andy asks her to find information regarding the relatives of the office members, Nellie intentionally lies and tells Andy that Kevin is related to John Wayne Gacy and John Wayne Bobbitt. He is disappointed to learn that he is not related to either John Wayne or Dwayne "The Rock" Johnson, whom he erroneously calls "Wayne". Andy also informs the office that Jim is related to former president Richard Nixon and that Meredith Palmer (Kate Flannery) is related to infamous axe-murder suspect Lizzie Borden. Before he realizes that all of the office members' ancestors are fakes, Dwight admits that his were members of the German American Bund, a pro-Nazi group in the 1930s.

== Broadcast and reception ==
=== Ratings ===
"Andy's Ancestry" originally aired on NBC on October 4, 2012. The episode was viewed by 4.14 million viewers and received a 2.2/6 percent share in the 18–49 demographic. This means that it was seen by 2.2 percent of all 18- to 49-year-olds, and 6 percent of all 18- to 49-year-olds watching television at the time of the broadcast. The episode marked a slight increase when compared to the previous episode, "Roy's Wedding". The Office finished fourth in its time slot, being beaten by an episode of the ABC series Grey's Anatomy which received a 3.8/10 percent rating; an entry of the CBS drama Person of Interest, which received a 3.0/8 percent rating; and an installment Fox series Glee, which received a 2.6/7 percent rating. Despite this, The Office was the highest-rated NBC television program of the night.

=== Reviews ===
Erik Adams of The A.V. Club gave the episode a moderately positive review and awarded it a "B". Adams highlighted the serious discussion between Darryl and Jim in the warehouse, noting that "Jim's extrication is something to root for", and that it honored "Craig Robinson's dedication to the show". While feeling that some of the episode's subplots were forced, he complimented the Pam and Nellie pairing due to "Pam's past ability to break through [people like] Angela and Dwight's defenses". Bonnie Stiernberg of Paste magazine noted that, despite Andy's regression to "his old ways", it was beneficial for the episode and allowed for many jokes to be played out. Furthermore, Stiernberg applauded the subtle drama that ran throughout the entry, writing Darryl, Erin, and Pete's interactions with Andy were important to the overall storyline. Mark Trammell of TV Equals named it "the best episode of the final season of The Office to date" because it "played to the show's strengths". Furthermore, he complimented the character development of Nellie, writing that she "really started to grow on me this week" and that his favorite line was Darryl's "words of wisdom" to Jim: "It's not real until your wife is on board." Michael Tedder of New York magazine gave the episode a positive review and noted that "It's been a while since The Office was this surprising and moving." He wrote that the main plot allowed for "overdue development" in regards to other characters and applauded the continued drama involving Pam and Jim; he called the last shot "quietly heartbreaking". He did, however, call it a "particularly overstuffed episode", and felt that Erin's subplot should have been moved to a different episode in the season.

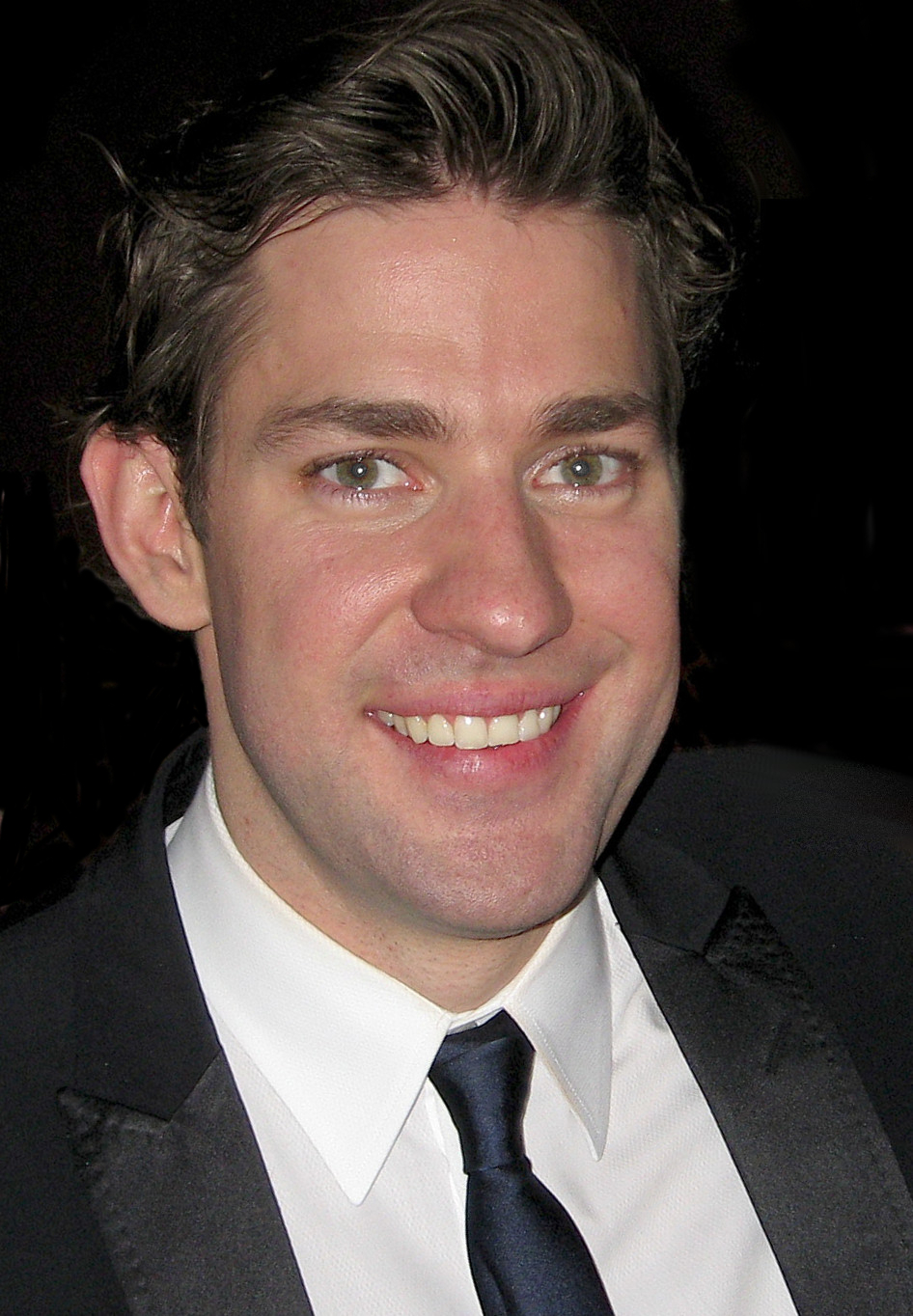
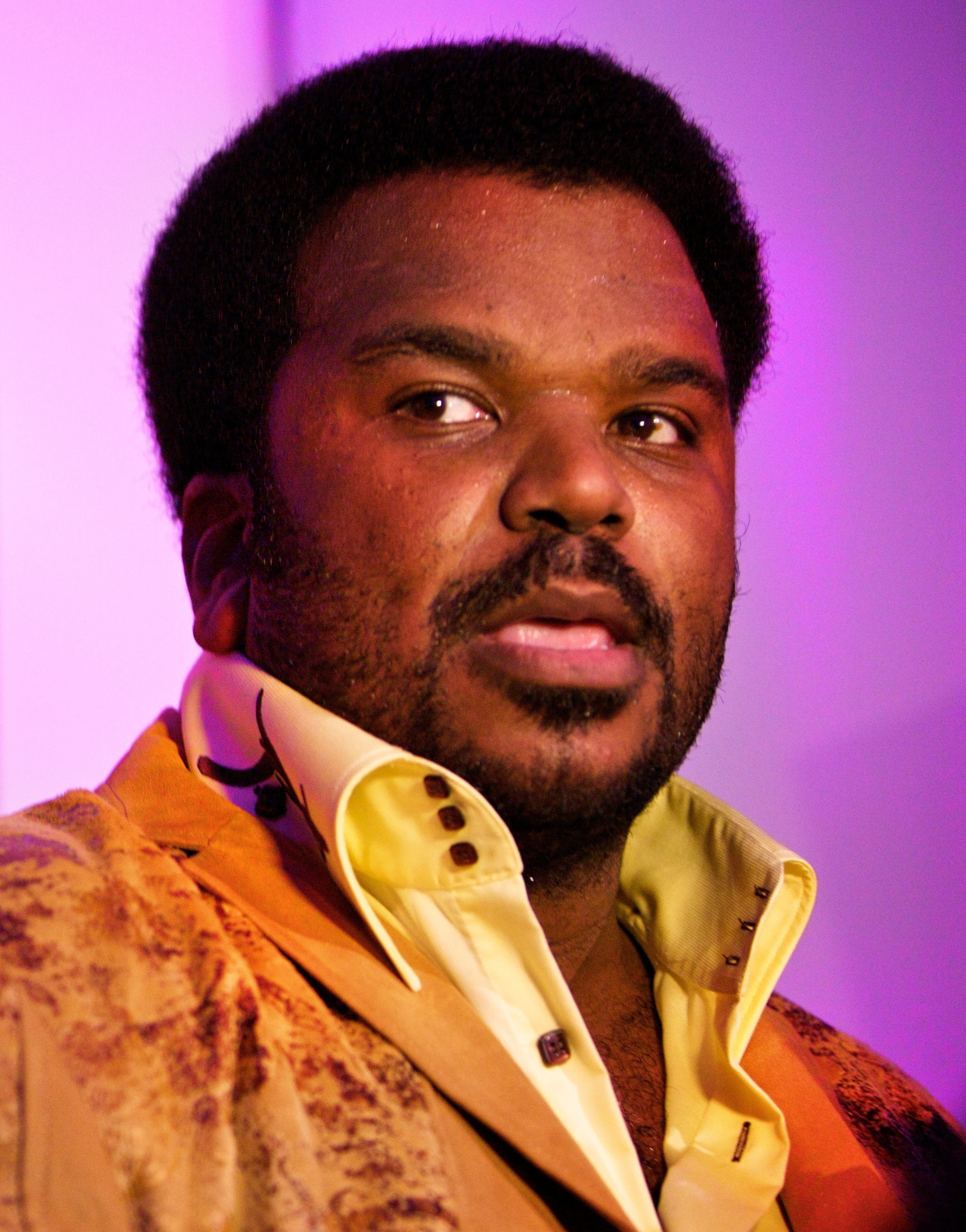
The conversation between John Krasinski (left) and Craig Robinson's (right) characters received critical praise.

E! Online called Pete "especially charming" after "Andy's Ancestry", and named him one of the "Best Things in Pop Culture". Joseph Kratzer of WhatCulture! awarded the episode four out of five stars and said "The triumphant return of The Office continues with another enjoyable episode." He explained that the success of the first episodes of the ninth season "comes from a fluidity not seen in recent years, an organic component that helped make the series such a success in its second and third seasons". He argued it was not "the tightest plotted episode" but that it was "better than 90% of last season". IGN writer Cindy White awarded the episode an 8.2, designating a "great" episode. She applauded the fact that "the show is returning to its roots" as well as the fact that the actors themselves "seem more invested" in the series. She also called the conversation between Darryl and Jim a "nice change of pace". She concluded that the plot allowed for a "good source of laughs in the smartly written" episode.

Dan Forcella of TV Fanatic awarded the episode three and a half stars out of five and called it "another decent episode". He wrote that Pam and Nellie's bonding was the subplot that "worked best". Nick Campbell of TV.com wrote that "the writers [are] trying to shove Andy Bernard in a Michael Scott-shaped hole." Furthermore, he called Nellie "the greatest square peg of them all." Brett Harrison Davinger of the California Literary Review, despite enjoying the tension between Pam and Jim, felt that the main story never went anywhere. He called the main action of the episode "lifeless", but wrote that the entry as a whole set up the conclusion of the series. Davinger also applauded Darryl's sound byte call back.

The episode's cold open attracted particular praise. Adams called it a "killer cold open". Stiernberg referred to the sequence as "one of the funniest in a long time". Kratzer called Steve's remark to Dwight about "not seeing race" one of his "favorite moments" from the episode. Forcella called it "hilarious" and "one of the best openings we've seen in a long, long time." Trammell called the prank "classic Office".
