= Broken Silence (1995 film) =

- Directed by: Wolfgang Panzer
- Produced by: Wolfgang Panzer; Claudia Sontheim (also production manager)
- Starring: Martin Huber; Ameenah Kaplan; Michael Moriarty
- Cinematography: Wolfgang Panzer; Edwin Horak
- Edited by: Claudio Di Mauro
- Music by: Filippo Trecca
- Distributed by: Camera Obscura (Switzerland)
- Release date: 1995
- Running time: 106 min
- Country: Switzerland
- Language: English

Broken Silence is a 1995 Swiss English-language film directed by Wolfgang Panzer. The film was theatrically released in 1995 in Switzerland but in 1996 only in Germany.

== Plot ==
The Carthusian monk Fried Adelphi has spent 25 years in the Swiss charterhouse La Valsainte, keeping his vow of silence and meditation, when his prior instructs him to go and seek the owner of their monastery, in order to extend an expiring 100-year lease. The owner is a vulcanologist; she now lives a secluded life in the mountains of Indonesia. Released from his vow of silence, Fried starts his journey and experiences the culture shock to be expected already in the plane: he loses his wallet, which his seat neighbor, Ashaela, an African American drummer from New York, silently takes. Suffering from claustrophobia, Fried leaves the plane at the Delhi stopover, to continue his travel by sea, but now he has no money. Ashaela offers him a ride to town. Thus begins a journey that will take them both to various parts of India and to Indonesia. Fried must learn to adapt his dress rules to the Asian climate. Ashaela eventually admits the origin of the travel funds. We learn she suffers from an incurable disease and may die anytime now. The Carthusian monk throws overboard what is too much of monastic rules and habits, and with Ashaela's help, he eventually fulfills his assignment. Soon after, he cremates the woman's body at a palm tree oceanfront, according to her will, but against his own religious beliefs and a Church interdict. Before ending his journey, Fried goes to New York, to bring back a pair of drumsticks to Ashaela's friend. Then Fried visits a local church to confess.

Note: The Carthusian confesses piece by piece what happened to him and what he did; the impatient New York priest listens only reluctantly at first, then becomes gradually interested and the story above is told in flashback.

== Cast ==
- Martin Huber as Fried Adelphi
- Ameenah Kaplan as Ashaela
- Michael Moriarty as Father Mulligan
- Colonel R.K. Kapoor as Immigration Officer

== Production ==
Spoken English in this Wolfgang Panzer's film comes in different variants: German-Swiss English by Huber, New York English by Kaplan, also Indian and Indonesian English.
Most of the location scenes were shot with a camcorder in Hi8 video, and only the New York City scenes are in 35-mm film. The audio engineer was Federico Festuccia.

== Reception ==
Broken Silence was released with eleven copies in German cinemas and within a year garnered some 160,000 spectators. It was shown in at the 1998 Katholikentag in Mainz. The jury of the Bavarian film award specially invented a new category honoring Panzer's English-language film.
"It would be easy to simply mock the rules of the religious man, that anachronistic and sometimes too little social must be the modern Europeans. Wolfgang Panzer succeeds the unexpected: almost from behind this monk starts along with his awkward intolerability, his stalwart adherence to his commandments and rituals, to grow the audience at the heart with his childish piety and his astonished awakening to the world. Fried's odyssey is an educational trip, never yet seen in the cinema. Broken Silence is not a pious nor a religious film - it tells the story of a socialization. The monk needs much time and long distances to find out from his self-centeredness. That he sometimes gives off a ridiculous figure, he begins to suspect; but he accepts it with dignity."

"A little-known gem of Swiss cinema, Broken Silence is one of those films that one won't forget- as long as the spectator accepts a few implausible plot points and the quality of the image, shot on video for lack of budget.", wrote Brianna Berg for the Swiss French-language website Il est une foi. The film was indeed noted by Le Temps for its "exoticism and the spontaneity of its camcording".

=== Awards ===
- 1995: Shanghai International Film Festival Golden Goblet Best Film: Wolfgang Panzer
- 1996: Prix du Public Cinéma-Cinéma, GIFF, Genève: Broken Silence
- 1996 Chicago International Film Festival, «Silver Hugo Award» - Best Supporting Actor: Michael Moriarty
- 1996: Geneva Cinéma Tout Ecran: Wolfgang Panzer
- 1996: Prix du public Cinéprix Télécom, 1996 - Audience Award: Broken Silence
- 1996: Bavarian Film Awards - «Sonderpreis» - Special Award: Wolfgang Panzer
- 1997: Berliner Kunstpreis (Academy of Arts, Berlin): Wolfgang Panzer

== See also ==
- Carthusians
- Resurrection of the dead (Christianity)
- Catholic views on cremation
