= Here Comes Treble =

- The Office episode
- Episode no.: Season 9 Episode 5
- Directed by: Claire Scanlon
- Written by: Owen Ellickson
- Cinematography by: Matt Sohn
- Editing by: Claire Scanlon
- Production code: 9006
- Original air date: October 25, 2012
- Running time: 22 minutes

Guest appearances
- Stephen Colbert as Broccoli Rob; Jack Coleman as Robert Lipton

Episode chronology
← Previous "Work Bus"	Next → "The Boat"
- The Office (American season 9)

"Here Comes Treble" is the fifth episode of the ninth season of the American comedy television series The Office. The episode originally aired on NBC on October 25, 2012. It guest stars Stephen Colbert as Andy's college friend Broccoli Rob and Ben Silverman as an investor.

The series depicts the everyday lives of office employees in the Scranton, Pennsylvania branch of the fictional Dunder Mifflin Paper Company. In the episode, Andy Bernard (Ed Helms) invites his old college a cappella group, Here Comes Treble, to perform for the office during Halloween. Andy, however, gets angry when he hears that his college friend Broccoli Rob (Colbert) is telling a different story about the group. Meanwhile, Dwight Schrute (Rainn Wilson), with the help of Nellie Bertram (Catherine Tate) tries to track down a person who is using prescription anxiety pills. Jim (John Krasinski) and Pam Halpert (Jenna Fischer) fight over his new job.

The title is a reference to Andy's college a cappella group, which had previously been alluded to in the series, but never actually shown. The episode also marked the final Halloween installment for the series. "Here Comes Treble" received mixed reviews from television critics, with many mainly criticizing Andy's characterization. Others were more complimentary of the episode's subplots. "Here Comes Treble" was viewed by 4 million viewers and received a 1.9/5 percent rating among adults between the ages of 18 and 49, ranking third in its timeslot. The episode, however, ranked as the highest-rated NBC series of the night.

== Synopsis ==
It is Halloween, and Andy Bernard invites the latest roster of his Cornell University a cappella group, Here Comes Treble (portrayed by the University of Virginia Hullabahoos), to perform for the office during the Halloween party. He secretly hopes the group will ask him to lead them in a performance of George Michael's "Faith". He becomes increasingly frustrated when the group is not interested in talking about his glory days as part of the group, and upon learning that old bandmate Broccoli Rob claimed Andy's nickname of "Boner Champ", Andy complains to both Rob, via video chat, and to Erin Hannon. Though Erin sees the situation as trivial, she nonetheless demands that the group sing "Faith" for Andy.

For his new job, Jim Halpert meets with investors. Although the investing window had closed, Jim insists on taking part and offers $10,000 under pressure—much more than he and Pam Halpert had agreed to. After Jim returns, he tells Pam during the Here Comes Treble's performance, and they start arguing during the singing. When the group begins performing "Faith", Andy is surprised that Rob appears via video to sing the lead. The group mistakenly thought the song was to be dedicated to Andy, and they contacted Rob to sing it with them. The "concert" ends and Andy continues to argue with Rob as Rob halfheartedly apologizes for stealing Andy's song until Erin finally puts an end to the video chat. Andy entertains the idea of moving to Cornell to keep his legacy alive. Alarmed, Erin redirects him towards using his family's money to create a scholarship for young a cappella singers. When he calls his mother to set it up, she informs him the family has lost all their money.

Dwight Schrute finds an anti-anxiety pill on the floor and begins a search for the office "madman". Nellie Bertram admits that the pill belongs to her; she explains that she doesn't want Dwight to find out, as she once saw him yell at Phyllis Vance for "sneezing incorrectly." Nellie partners with him in the investigation in order to escape his suspicions, but ultimately confesses that the pill belongs to her. Having been experiencing anxiety himself from work and taking care of his cousin Mose, Dwight asks Nellie to share some pills with him, but pretends that they are for Mose. At the end of the episode, Oscar Martinez is shown secretly kissing Angela Lipton's husband Senator Lipton.

Nellie Bertram dresses up as Toby as her Halloween costume. Toby notices this and becomes flattered, growing feelings for Nellie. He then gives Nellie a bouquet of flowers but is ultimately rejected and fills with anger.

== Production ==
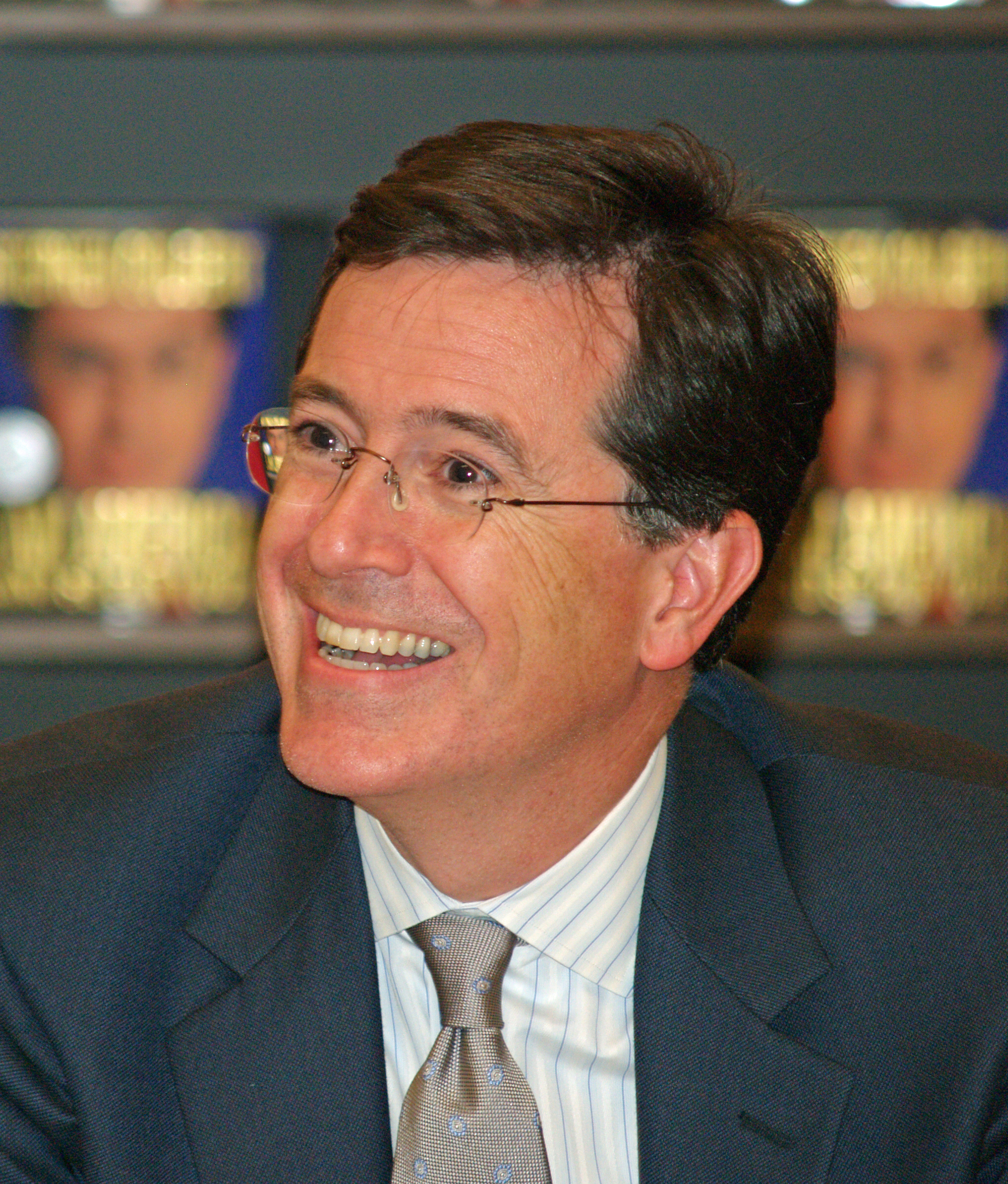
The episode guest starred Stephen Colbert, who played Broccoli Rob.

"Here Comes Treble" was written by supervising producer Owen Ellickson, marking his third writing credit for the series, after the eighth season episodes "Pool Party" and "Fundraiser". The episode was directed by Claire Scanlon, who has served as an editor on the series for several seasons, this was her second directing credit after the eighth season episode, "Angry Andy".

The title is a reference to Andy's a cappella group Here Comes Treble, which had previously been alluded to in the series, but never actually shown. "Here Comes Treble" guest stars Stephen Colbert as Andy's college friend Broccoli Rob. Former NBC Entertainment co-chairman Ben Silverman also guest stars as one of the investors who attends Jim's meeting. With the filming of "Here Comes Treble", the cast began realizing that the show was truly approaching its end. Wilson said, "it's getting real. It's like there's a clock ticking". Helms said that the fact that the episode was the last Halloween installment for the series is "a sad thing".

The official website of The Office included three cut scenes from "Here Comes Treble" within a week of the episode's release. In the 146-second clip, Andy tells the office that the a cappella group is staying with Andy and Erin—Andy gets the basses and B-tones and Erin gets the tenors. In another scene, Andy throws a tantrum about his solo and his nickname. In the final shot, Andy gives the group nihilistic advice about the future before he sings "Faith".

== Cultural references ==
Due to the nature of the episode, many of the characters are dressed as cultural icons and characters from fiction. Meredith Palmer (Kate Flannery) is dressed as Scarlett Johansson's version of the superhero Black Widow from the 2012 superhero film The Avengers. Kevin Malone (Brian Baumgartner) is dressed as Charlie Brown, the protagonist in the comic strip Peanuts by Charles M. Schulz. Angela is dressed as former First Lady Nancy Reagan, with her husband State Senator Robert Lipton wearing a Ronald Reagan mask. Oscar Martinez (Oscar Nunez) is dressed as a dinosaur, but states that he is "the Electoral College". Andy is dressed as George Michael. For the episode, Wilson's character is dressed up as a pig. Wilson noted that the "writers really just wanted to torture me by having me in a pig's nose for an entire week of shooting".

Due to the presence of the a cappella group, the episode features several songs. The group sings the Rose Royce 1976 single "Car Wash", the 1983 Culture Club song "Karma Chameleon", and Edwin McCain's 1998 hit "I'll Be". The group also sings Cornell's alma mater. Pam and Jim later get in an argument about the 1962 novelty song "The Monster Mash". During their Skype-argument Broccoli Rob mentions that he collaborated with Trey Anastasio, the frontman for the jam band Phish. During the seventh season episode "The Sting", Andy mentioned that Broccoli Rob and Anastasio had collaborated on a song together.

== Broadcast and reception ==
=== Ratings ===
"Here Comes Treble" originally aired on NBC on October 25, 2012. The episode was viewed by 4 million viewers and received a 1.9 rating/5% share among adults between the ages of 18 and 49. This means that it was seen by 1.9 percent of all 18- to 49-year-olds, and 5 percent of all 18- to 49-year-olds watching television at the time of the broadcast. This made "Here Comes Treble", at the time of its airing, the lowest-rated episode of The Office, beating the eighth season entry "Fundraiser", which was viewed by 4.17 million viewers. The Office finished third in its time slot, being beaten by an episode of the American Broadcasting Company (ABC) series Grey's Anatomy which received a 3.0/8 percent rating and an entry of the CBS drama Person of Interest, which received a 2.9/8 percent rating Despite this, The Office was the highest-rated NBC television program of the night.

=== Reviews ===
The episode received mixed reviews from critics. Erik Adams of The A.V. Club awarded the episode a "B−". He criticized the characterization of Andy and said that the character had "hit a plateau when his fist went through that wall in season three" and represented "a grinning puppet who can be imbued with some of Michael Scott's leftover tics and remind people he went to Cornell". However, Adams enjoyed the episode's subplots and wrote that the episode really "gave me a better picture of what makes Andy's girlfriend tick." Furthermore, he praised many of her lines and her acting ability. Damon Houx of ScreenCrush said that the episode was a "surprisingly strong Erin episode" and that "Dwight acting crazy was also well used". Dan Forcella of TV Fanatic awarded the episode three-and-a-half stars out of five and called it "a nice enough holiday episode". He was critical of the episode's Jim and Pam subplot, saying that it could have "been left on the cutting room floor." IGN reviewer Cindy White awarded the episode a 7.9 rating, denoting a "good" episode. She wrote that while the story had its limitations, "Little lines and bits ... helped elevate 'Here Comes Treble'".

Michael Tedder of New York felt that the main story was weak and that the "plot line might have made more sense last year, with Andy trying to take his mind off troubles with Erin or Robert California by trying to regress to his college days without it working, but these days Andy is the boss and has the girl." He did, however, compliment the appearance of Colbert, writing that "it was still nice to see the two Daily Show alums sparring again." He was also complimentary towards the "little tidbits", such as Dwight's subplot. Bonnie Stiergnberg of Paste felt that the episode was too rushed and that the storylines did not have a chance to naturally play out. She wrote that, "Each thread provided some interesting character development or set up future storylines, but, crammed together in the same 21 minutes, they made for a slightly disjointed-feeling episode." WhatCulture! reviewer Joseph Kratzer gave the episode two-and-a-half stars out of five and called it the "first dud of the ninth season". He criticized the story, saying that "the plot's failure [is due to the fact that] the goal of the story was not met by the means the writers chose to employ; there was no sense of grand scope or deep-rooted history, just Andy being petty and refusing to let go of the past as he's challenged by his old friend." Kratzer called Dwight and Nellie's subplot the "most successful story" in the episode.

The manner in which Stephen Colbert appeared received mixed reviews. Adams compared Colbert's cameo to former lead actor Steve Carell's appearance in the first series of the BBC Two sitcom Life's Too Short, calling it "an unfortunate echo". White wrote that his cameo was not "quite the sublime experience I was hoping for" largely due to the amount of anticipation that was put into his appearance. Kratzer called the underuse of Colbert "borderline criminal".
