= Work Bus =

- The Office episode
- Episode no.: Season 9 Episode 4
- Directed by: Bryan Cranston
- Written by: Brent Forrester
- Cinematography by: Matt Sohn
- Editing by: Rob Burnett
- Production code: 9004
- Original air date: October 18, 2012
- Running time: 22 minutes

Episode chronology
← Previous "Andy's Ancestry"	Next → "Here Comes Treble"
- The Office (American season 9)

"Work Bus" is the fourth episode of the ninth season of the American comedy television series The Office and the show's 180th episode overall. The episode originally aired on NBC on October 18, 2012. The episode was written by Brent Forrester and was directed by Bryan Cranston.

The series depicts the everyday lives of office employees in the Scranton, Pennsylvania branch of the fictional Dunder Mifflin Paper Company. In the episode, Jim (John Krasinski) convinces Dwight (Rainn Wilson) that the building is unsafe, leading to Dwight renting a bus and setting up the office inside. Meanwhile, Nellie (Catherine Tate) asks for Andy's (Ed Helms) help in adopting a baby. Jim tries to make Pam (Jenna Fischer) happy with some pie.

"Work Bus" received mostly positive reviews from television critics. Many praised the episode's humor and the dynamic between Jim and Pam, and Jim and Dwight. Despite this, Andy's characterization throughout the episode was mainly criticized. "Work Bus" was viewed by 4.28 million viewers and received a 2.1/6 percent rating among adults between the ages of 18 and 49, ranking third in its timeslot. The Office also ranked as the highest-rated NBC series of the night.

== Synopsis ==
Jim Halpert is irritated that Dwight Schrute will not fulfill his landlord responsibilities and fix the dangerously substandard office wiring, as Dwight does not want to pay for the expensive rewiring or give everyone a week off for this purpose. Jim comes up with a plan to pretend that the building’s magnetic power is affecting Dwight’s fertility, in order to get the repairs as well as a week off from work for his wife Pam (whom he is trying to be extra nice to in order to show gratitude for her supporting him for his new job plans). The fertility prank is executed when Jim pops a few kernels in a popcorn bag and places it under one of the exposed areas, to make it look like the magnetic power popped it. Dwight promptly shuts down the office, but to the disappointment of Jim, rents a tightly-spaced bus for the staff to work on; Clark Green and Darryl Philbin leave the bus to stretch their legs. While Dwight is gleeful at first for ruining Jim's plan, Jim manages to convince Andy to force Dwight to drive the bus to a local pie store, leaving behind Clark and Darryl. At one point, they pick up a hitchhiker, which turns out to be Creed Bratton, who was playing hooky.

Jim harnesses the office workers' love of the local pie stand to please Pam. Kevin Malone shows a hidden talent for math now that pie is involved, able to calculate the time it would take to drive to the stand before it closes. Annoyed by the pressure, Dwight eventually gets angry and climbs onto the roof of the bus, refusing to drive any further. Pam suspects something else is wrong and asks Jim to talk to him. Jim learns that Dwight thought his magnetic power prank was real as he suspects he is infertile, which he believes explains why he was not the father of Angela Martin's baby. Jim assures Dwight that that was a prank, and that he is like a father to the entire office. Enlightened, Dwight drives everyone to the pie stand where they have a great finish to their day.

Nellie Bertram asks for Andy Bernard's help in adopting a baby, as the local adoption agency requires a reference letter from an employer. Andy promises to read her application letter, but tells the camera crew he will only sign it if she admits that she is a horrible person in it. However, Andy is unaware that Erin Hannon is using her own painful past as a non-adopted orphan to help Nellie with the process. When Andy coldly rejects Nellie's letter (which Erin helped her write), Nellie accepts his decision, but Andy is stunned to hear Erin crying sadly over the failure. He finally adds some mildly snarky but complimentary lines to her letter and signs onto it as a reference, leaving Nellie overjoyed.

== Production ==
"Work Bus" was written by executive producer Brent Forrester, marking his tenth writing credit for the series, his first since the seventh-season episode "The Search". Forrester had previously been named executive producer of the series before the start of the season. The episode was also directed by Bryan Cranston, the star of the AMC drama series Breaking Bad. It was initially announced he was going to guest-direct an episode by cast member Rainn Wilson via Twitter. Cranston had previously directed episodes from other comedy series, including Malcolm in the Middle and Modern Family. Entertainment Weekly later confirmed the episode title and its airdate. During filming, the cast and crew of the series began to refer to the episode as "Death Bus" due to an on-set incident: At one point, the exhaust from a running vehicle was inadvertently positioned in front of the bus's air intake, which caused the interior to fill with lethal carbon monoxide gas.

The official website of The Office included three cut scenes from "Work Bus" within a week of the episode's release. In the 43-second clip, Pete and Erin indulge in a little unlawful fantasy. In the second 104-second clip, the office continues their "Shabooya Roll Call", with Phyllis, Oscar, Dwight (reluctantly) and Andy participating, while Angela criticizes their game. In the final 67-second clip, Clark helps Darryl out with PowerPoint.

== Cultural references ==
The cold opening for the episode features Andy showing the office various sports bloopers that he edited to make look funnier than they actually are, a reference to the popular "Fail" internet memes. Dwight notes that he is fine living in an EMF field, because most of his super-hero idols got their powers from massive amounts of electricity. Andy, by Nellie's own admission, thinks that she should "go back to Loch Ness", a reference to the mythical Loch Ness monster.

== Broadcast and reception ==
=== Ratings ===
"Work Bus" originally aired on NBC on October 18, 2012. The episode was viewed by 4.28 million viewers and received a 2.1 rating/6% share among adults between the ages of 18 and 49. This means that it was seen by 2.1 percent of all 18 to 49-year-olds, and 6 percent of all 18 to 49-year-olds watching television at the time of the broadcast. This marks a slight decrease in the ratings when compared to the previous episode, "Andy's Ancestry". The Office finished third in its time slot, being beaten by an episode of the ABC series Grey's Anatomy which received a 3.4/9 percent rating and an entry of the CBS drama Person of Interest, which received a 2.8/7 percent rating Despite this, The Office was the highest-rated NBC television program of the night.

=== Reviews ===
"The first few scenes set on the bus pin their jokes on visual gags and slapstick, which is met with varying degrees of success. But, once pie comes into the equation, it's like Forrester and his fellow writers hit upon a magical key that unlocks the height of funniness within The Office's ensemble. This upward incline in quality is further proof that character needs to drive the show's bus—The Office may be a situation comedy, but its situations don't sing if they're out of sync with Dwight, Jim, and their co-workers."

— Erik Adams, The A.V. Club

"Work Bus" received mostly positive reviews. The A.V. Club reviewer Erik Adams considered "Work Bus" to be the funniest episode of the series since the seventh season. He noted that while the episode had a slow start, the writers used the pie concept and ensemble cast to reach a "height of funniness", and compared the "mob mentality" of the cast to The Simpsons. He rated the episode a B+. IGN writer Cindy White called the episode a "pretty good example of how to do an out-of-the-office episode right", considering it to be superior to other out-of-office episodes, including "Christening" and "Gettysburg". She also complimented the characterization of Jim, Pam and Dwight, and their relationships with each other, but criticized the characterization of Andy as well as the cold open, for making Andy too similar to Michael, and later on commented that his new "douche-baggery" spoiled the episode for her. She gave the episode a 7.8/10, concluding that it was a "good" episode. Michael Tedder of New York gave a positive review and praised the scene featuring Jim and Dwight on the roof of the bus, saying their dynamic had matured over the years. Tedder also complimented Cranston's direction in the episode, commenting that the "cramped quality of 'Work Bus' was well matched with Cranston's talents". He also wrote that the Nellie-Andy subplot had some potential to become "promising" if their rivalry continues through the rest of the season, but "we'll have to see".

Brett Harrison Davinger of California Literary Review was more positive, writing that the episode had a more "classic Office" feeling, due to its humor and emotion, which he considered missing from the series in the previous seasons. He praised Jim for being "the show's heart" for being motivated from "a real place" and complimented his final scenes with Dwight, for actually being more in-character in his motivation unlike previous episodes, such as "The Incentive" and "Last Day in Florida". He also praised Jim and Pam's final scene together for having "genuine, quiet tenderness" to it. He also complimented the episode's humor and for Andy's "dick" behavior.

Alan Sepinwall of HitFix had a more mixed review, calling the episode decent by late-era The Office standards. While he criticized Andy's behavior for being too much like Michael Scott, and Kevin for being "developmentally disabled", he complimented the episode for having "some decent laughs" and for the Jim-Dwight-Pam storyline. He especially praised Jim and Dwight's scene on the roof of the bus, comparing it to previous scenes in the series between Jim and Michael or Pam and Michael, saying it was able to show the "core of real emotion underneath the cartoon character [Dwight]". Dan Forcella of TV Fanatic awarded the episode three stars out of five, saying that without Brian Baumgartner's performance, the episode "might not have been worth watching". He only had praise for Baumgartner's performance in his character's gags throughout the episode.
