= Roy's Wedding =

- The Office episode
- Episode no.: Season 9 Episode 2
- Directed by: Matt Sohn
- Written by: Allison Silverman
- Cinematography by: Sarah Levy
- Editing by: Claire Scanlon
- Production code: 9002
- Original air date: September 27, 2012
- Running time: 22 minutes

Guest appearances
- David Denman as Roy Anderson; Sara Chase as Laura; Ameenah Kaplan as Val Johnson; Bobby Ray Shafer as Bob Vance; Michael Patrick McGill as Kenny Anderson

Episode chronology
← Previous "New Guys"	Next → "Andy's Ancestry"
- The Office (American season 9)

"Roy's Wedding" is the second episode of the ninth season of the American comedy television series The Office and the show's 178th episode overall. The episode originally aired on NBC on September 27, 2012. The episode guest stars David Denman as Roy Anderson, Michael Patrick McGill as his brother, Kenny, Robert R. Shafer as Bob Vance, and Ameenah Kaplan as Val.

The series depicts the everyday lives of office employees in the Scranton, Pennsylvania branch of the fictional Dunder Mifflin Paper Company. In this episode, Pam (Jenna Fischer) and Jim Halpert (John Krasinski) are invited to the wedding of Roy Anderson (Denman) – Pam's former fiancé. Roy's wedding toast later leads to Pam and Jim searching their relationship for any secrets that the other might not know about. Jim, however, hides the fact that he has started a company with a college friend, and Pam grows more and more suspicious. Meanwhile, Dwight Schrute (Rainn Wilson) reacts to Nellie Bertram's (Catherine Tate) mandatory charity initiative by announcing he will donate to the Taliban.

"Roy's Wedding" saw the return of Denman as Roy, who was a regular character in the show's first three seasons. The episode received moderately positive reviews from critics. Many applauded the emotional drama in Pam and Jim's storyline. However, many reviews gave the episode's two subplots mixed reviews. "Roy's Wedding" was viewed by an estimated 4.13 million viewers and received a 2.1 rating/6 percent share among adults between the ages of 18 and 49. The episode ranked fourth in its timeslot and was also the highest-rated NBC series of the night.

== Synopsis ==
In the cold open, Pam Halpert creates a chore wheel after the office janitor is on vacation, but everyone else in the office complains that it is no fun. Pam changes the wheel so that it barely relates to chores or work at all, which goes over well. Pam adds a "tiny wheel" as an option that does have chores on them, but "it's so cute, no one seems to mind."

Pam and Jim Halpert are invited to Pam's former fiancé Roy Anderson's wedding, which takes place at 8 am before work. They are surprised by Roy's beautiful home and the elegant wedding details, and Roy tells them he runs a very successful gravel company. During his wedding toast, Roy surprises his bride by performing "She's Got a Way" by Billy Joel on the piano; he told her he was taking boxing lessons as a cover for learning some music. Pam and Jim, stunned by Roy's transformation, try to find things about themselves the other does not know. This is exacerbated by Jim's frequent calls about a new business he is starting with a friend, because Jim and Pam agreed that the venture was not right for them, but Jim then signed onto it without telling his wife he had done so. Pam tries unsuccessfully to bait Jim to find out what the secret is and becomes increasingly annoyed that her husband is lying to her.

Dwight Schrute angrily reacts to Nellie Bertram's mandatory charity initiative by maintaining that he will donate the money he raises to the Global Relief Foundation, a front for the Taliban. Nellie then makes Dwight sign a contract in "a ridiculous font" to live by Taliban rules in the office, the font making Dwight believe that the contract is not genuine. Subsequently, she steals Dwight's pen and challenges him to cut her hand off for doing so, hoping he will capitulate and pick a legitimate charity. Dwight refuses to back down, but spends an inordinate amount of time preparing to do so before the two end up watching 127 Hours together upon the advice of Darryl Philbin, and end up forgetting the issue.

Clark Green hits on Erin Hannon by dangling a fake newscaster job. After receiving some not-so-helpful advice from her coworkers—especially Andy Bernard and Darryl, who is now assistant regional manager—Clark invites Erin to his apartment for the fake audition. However, Pete Miller, who has come to dislike Clark, invites himself and Andy along under the pretense of helping with the audition, ruining Clark's seduction plan. Andy ends up throwing himself into the fake plan and dismissing Erin, who goes out for dinner with Pete and enjoys time spent with him.

== Production ==
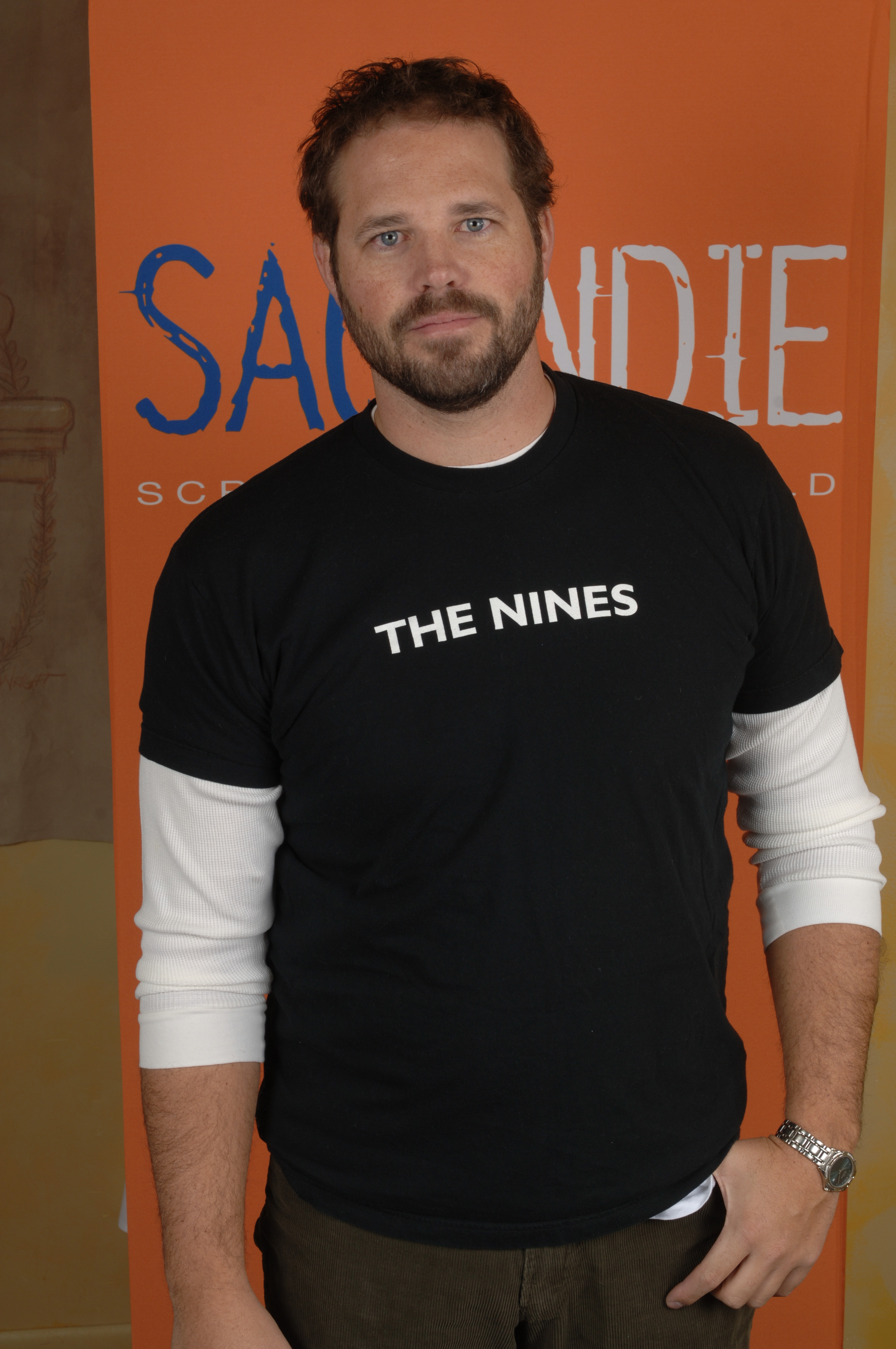
"Roy's Wedding" features a guest appearance by David Denman, a former regular cast member of the series.

"Roy's Wedding" was written by co-executive producer Allison Silverman, marking her second writing credit after joining the series the previous season and writing the episode, "Pam's Replacement". The episode was directed by series cinematographer Matt Sohn, marking his sixth director's credit for the series. This episode sees the return of David Denman as Roy Anderson. Roy was a regular character in the show's first three seasons. Denman's character was written out of the show near the end of the series' third season, although he did have small cameos in the fifth season episode "Crime Aid" and in the seventh season episode "Threat Level Midnight". On Twitter, Denman later called the episode "Roy's best episode!" The episode's subplot was announced by showrunner Greg Daniels early on via a press release; he noted that Dwight would be trying to spite Nellie by trying to donate to the Taliban.

The official website of The Office included several cut scenes from "Roy's Wedding" within a week of the episode's release. In the first 57-second clip, Darryl talks about his relationship with Roy and Pam talks to Roy's parents, who make subtle barbs about her lack of loyalty. In the second 84-second clip, Oscar (Oscar Nunez) notes that he is supporting a charity that supports the "homo-hispanic community", and Toby (Paul Lieberstein) notes that he wants to support a charity that helps "inconspicuous creatures" like moths.

== Cultural references ==
Andy chooses Darryl to be consigliere, a reference to the 1972 crime film The Godfather; one brief scene in the episode in which Darryl accepts the position parallels the final scene of The Godfather. Darryl later notes that he likes The Godfather because he is a "cinephile", but that he likes the 1983 film Scarface because he is black. Clark tries to start up a conversation with Erin about Newsweek. Later, while discussing news anchors, Meredith mentions how attractive she found Walter Cronkite. Dwight and Nellie watch 127 Hours, a 2010 biographical survival drama film starring James Franco as real-life canyoneer Aron Ralston, who became trapped by a boulder in an isolated slot canyon in Bluejohn Canyon, southeastern Utah, in April 2003, and was eventually forced to amputate his own right arm in order to free himself.

== Broadcast and reception ==
=== Ratings ===
"Roy's Wedding" originally aired on NBC on September 27, 2012. The episode was viewed by 4.13 million viewers and received a 2.1/6 percent share in the 18–49 demographic. This means that it was seen by 2.1 percent of all 18- to 49-year-olds, and 6 percent of all 18- to 49-year-olds watching television at the time of the broadcast. The episode stayed consistent when compared to the season opener "New Guys". The Office finished fourth in its time slot, being beaten by an episode of the ABC series Grey's Anatomy which received a 4.4/12 percent rating; an entry of the CBS drama Person of Interest, which received a 2.9/8 percent rating; and an installment of the Fox series Glee, which received a 2.4/7 percent rating. "Roy's Wedding", however, finished ahead of repeats of The CW show The Next. The Office was also the highest-rated NBC television program of the night.

=== Critical response ===
"Roy's Wedding" received moderately positive reviews from critics. Many applauded the emotional drama in Pam and Jim's storyline. The A.V. Club reviewer Myles McNutt praised the Jim-Pam storyline and Daniels for using the previous seasons of Jim and Pam's "boring storylines" to create greater drama for this episode and for the season as a whole. He also complimented the change of dynamic the episode caused, saying that by "allowing Jim and Pam to serve as the point of dramatic interest, the rest of the characters are loosened up to simply riff off of one another, a dynamic that felt bogged down by Andy's ascension to the leadership position last season". He rated the episode a "B". New York writer Michael Tedder praised the writers for going back to the show's early style of ongoing plotlines and the suspense in the Jim-Pam arc. Bonnie Stiernberg of Paste was not so positive, saying the whole episode and season storyline was "predictable" and a "wasted opportunity", and that it ultimately did not live up to the producers' promise to "shake things up in Scranton". Stiernberg rated the episode a 6.8 out of 10.

The episode's subplots, however, received mixed reviews. McNutt wrote that, while Tate had given a "rather subtle and charming performance", the Nellie-Dwight subplot felt like "a leftover idea" from the previous season. Tedder, on the other hand, liked the Dwight-Nellie subplot for its silliness, concluding that "ongoing plotlines are great, but it's still the little things on this show".

McNutt was not pleased with the characterization of Andy in the episode, calling him "insufferable" and "plain unlikeable". He also noted that Clark and Pete's prominence in the subplot, while enjoyable, seemed "weird for one part of the show to be invested in exploring characters' lives when another part of the show is deploying newly introduced characters". Tedder complimented the Erin-Clark subplot, for examining and introducing Pete and Clark further, and called Clark the "New Ryan". Stiernberg, on the other hand, considered the whole plot to be "too icky and unfunny" and that the aftermath of Pete and Erin's dinner together was "predictable".
