= The Whale (The Office) =

- The Office episode
- Episode no.: Season 9 Episode 7
- Directed by: Rodman Flender
- Written by: Carrie Kemper
- Cinematography by: Matt Sohn
- Editing by: Josh Belson
- Production code: 9008
- Original air date: November 15, 2012
- Running time: 22 minutes

Guest appearances
- Melora Hardin as Jan Levinson; Jack Coleman as Robert Lipton; Hugh Dane as Hank Tate; Carrie Kemper as Molly

Episode chronology
← Previous "The Boat"	Next → "The Target"
- The Office (American season 9)

"The Whale" is the seventh episode of the ninth season of the American comedy television series The Office and the 183rd episode overall. The episode originally aired on NBC on November 15, 2012. The episode guest stars Jack Coleman as Robert Lipton and marks the return of actress Melora Hardin as Jan Levinson.

The series depicts the everyday lives of office employees in the Scranton, Pennsylvania branch of the fictional Dunder Mifflin Paper Company. In this episode, Dwight Schrute (Rainn Wilson) is tasked with selling paper to a woman—who is later revealed to be Jan (Hardin)—from the Scranton White Pages, so Pam Halpert (Jenna Fischer) and the women of the office teach him how to interact with women. Angela Lipton (Angela Kinsey) confides in Oscar Martinez (Oscar Nunez) that her husband, Robert (Jack Coleman)—who is secretly having a relationship with Oscar—is cheating on her. Oscar helps her spy on her husband at his yoga class. Meanwhile, Toby Flenderson (Paul Lieberstein) convinces several of the men in the office to grow mustaches for "Movember".

"The Whale" received mixed reviews from television critics, with many commenting on Hardin's return. The episode was also viewed by 4.16 million viewers and received a 2.1/6 percent rating among adults between the ages of 18 and 49, ranking fourth in its timeslot. The episode, however, ultimately ranked as the highest-rated NBC series of the night.

== Synopsis ==
Andy Bernard Skypes into the office from his boat. He is severely sunburned, loses his supply of fresh water in the ocean, and is going mad from lack of human contact after only two days on the boat. The Skype call ends after he accidentally drops his device into the ocean.

Dwight Schrute is tasked with winning the Scranton White Pages account. However, the CEO is a woman, and Dwight has trouble selling to women. Pam Halpert and the women of the office teach him how to interact with women. The lesson, which is supported by Nellie Bertram, Erin Hannon, Meredith Palmer, and Phyllis Vance, goes nowhere, with Dwight unable to grasp the concept of simple niceties, and they give up. Pam goes with Dwight to the White Pages, only to find out that the buyer is Jan Levinson. Jan was expecting to meet with CEO David Wallace, and reprimands her assistant for the confusion. Pam quickly realizes that the meeting was just a ruse to take revenge on David for firing her five years prior. However, Dwight remains determined to make the sale, so he has Pam stall while he gets Clark, intuiting that Jan has an attraction to underage boys due to her rumored affair with her 17-year-old former assistant Hunter. After he introduces Clark to her, Jan says she will think about it, and tells everyone to leave her office except Clark. As Pam and Dwight leave, Dwight offers a sympathetic comment to Jan's emotionally abused female assistant. Pam is pleased, seeing that some of the lessons they gave Dwight on women sunk in after all.

Angela Lipton confides in Oscar Martinez that she suspects her husband, Robert—who is secretly having a relationship with Oscar—of cheating on her. Oscar thinks that Robert may be seeing another man besides him and convinces Angela that they should spy on Robert at his yoga class. They hide outside of the class and watch as Robert spends time with a younger woman who later turns out to have a boyfriend. Oscar then notices Robert spending most of the yoga practice with a young man, which he finds suspicious. After the class, Robert phones Oscar, and his phone goes off. Oscar panics and silences the phone, and Angela immediately realizes why.

Jim Halpert is on a business call with the investors and members of the business venture he is up for. Many distractions from the background make the call difficult. At the end of the day, Jim apologizes, but then hears the person on the phone saying this is not working out. Toby Flenderson convinces several of the men in the office to grow mustaches for "Movember". He says he is doing this to support the cure for prostate cancer but is actually using it for a chance to socialize more with the office, to no avail. Pete Miller later shows Erin his mustache, but she finds it repulsive. He shaves it off after that.

== Production ==
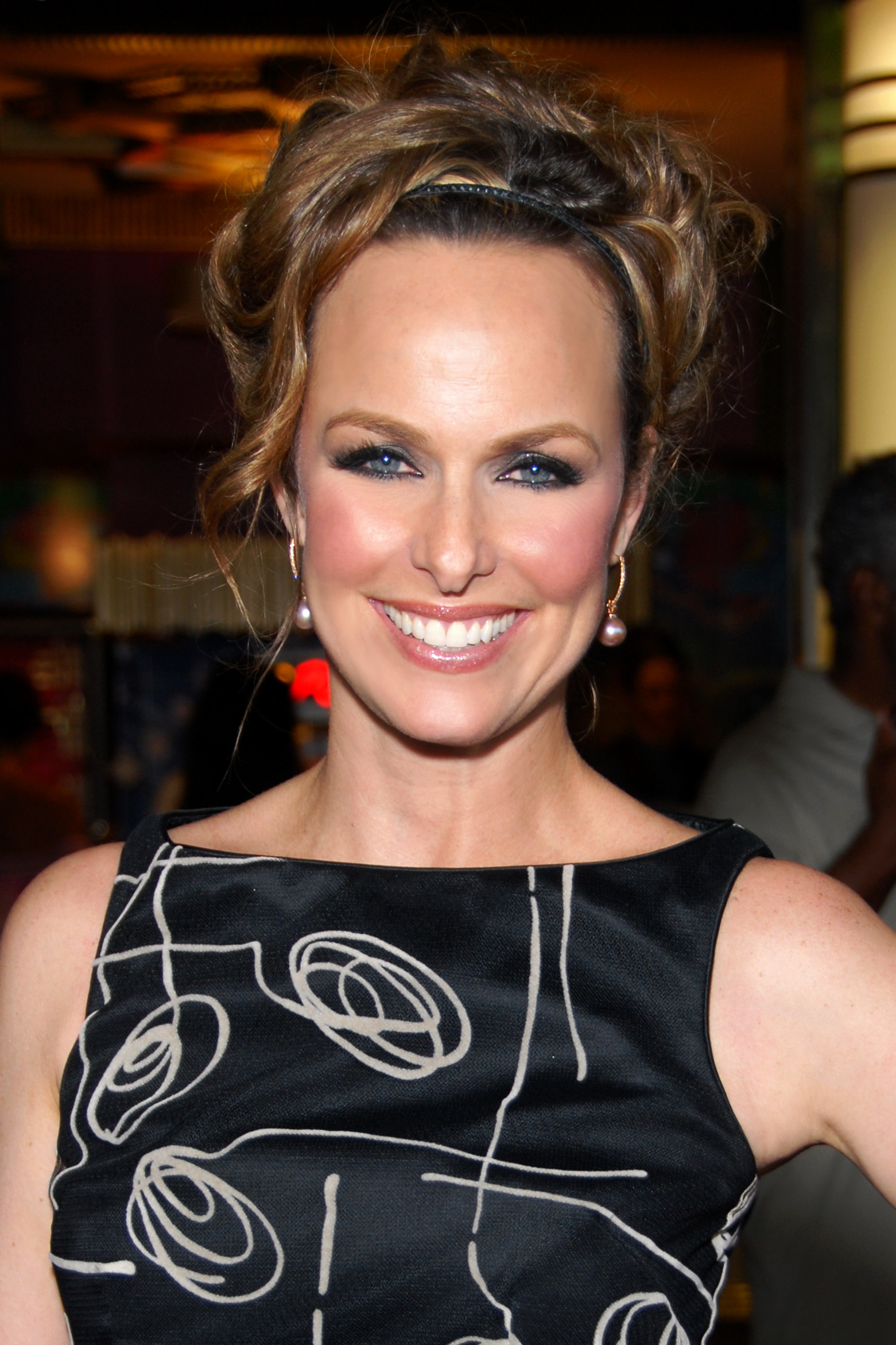
The episode marks the return of former series regular Melora Hardin.

"The Whale" was written by executive story editor Carrie Kemper, who is the younger sister of cast member Ellie Kemper, making it her third writing credit for the series. It was directed by Rodman Flender, his first directing credit for the series. The episode sees the return of Melora Hardin as Jan Levinson, a former character in the series who left after the early part of the fifth season. Hardin, did however, make two short appearances on the show during the seventh season episodes "Sex Ed" and "Threat Level Midnight". Ed Helms only appears in the episode's cold open; he was written out of several episodes of the season in order to film The Hangover Part III.

The official website of The Office included several cut scenes from "The Whale" within a week of the episode's release. In the first 105-second clip, Toby admits to the camera his amusement that the men at Dunder Mifflin are partaking in Movember with him. In the second 76-second clip, the women of Dunder Mifflin inform Dwight that his knowledge about women is severely lacking and that he has a long way to go. In the third and final 85-second clip, Dwight and Pam, while in the car, prepare for their "biggest sales call ever".

== Cultural references ==
The title of the episode—"The Whale"—is a reference to the popular 1851 novel Moby-Dick by Herman Melville and its main antagonist, the great white whale. The white pages, which is the sale that Dwight is attempting to make, are a listing of telephone subscribers in a geographical area or subscribers to services provided by the organization that publishes the directory. Toby organizes a Movember celebration, which is an annual, month-long event involving the growing of moustaches during the month of November to raise awareness of prostate cancer and other male cancer and associated charities.

== Broadcast and reception ==
=== Ratings ===
"The Whale" was scheduled to air on NBC on November 8, 2012, but the previous episode was delayed a week when it was replaced with a rerun of The Voice, pushing "The Whale" to air a week later, on November 15, 2012. In its original broadcast, "The Whale" was viewed by an estimated 4.16 million viewers and received a 2.1/6 percent share rating among adults between the ages of 18 and 49. This means that it was seen by 2.1 percent of all 18- to 49-year-olds, and 6 percent of all 18- to 49-year-olds watching television at the time of the broadcast. This marked a decrease in the ratings from the previous episode, "The Boat", which had received a 2.4 rating/6 percent. The episode ranked fourth in its timeslot, being beaten by the Fox series Glee which received a 2.2/6 percent rating, an entry of the CBS drama Person of Interest which received a 2.9/7 percent rating, and an episode of the ABC series Grey's Anatomy which received a 3.1/8 percent rating. Despite this, The Office was highest-rated NBC television program of the night.

=== Reviews ===
Mark Trammell of TV Equals was very pleased with the episode and wrote that "Rainn Wilson [was] clearly in his element". Damon Houx of Screencrush felt that the entry was rushed, which resulted in "most characters [getting] 2- to 3-minute storylines, or—in most cases—a joke or line or two." He called it "one of the better episodes of this last season", but noted that "the show's going to end with more of a whimper than a bang". Cindy White of IGN awarded the episode a 7.5 out of 10, denoting a "good" episode. White complimented Dwight and Pam's situation, as well Angela and Oscar's development. However, she noted that it "wasn't hard to imagine Michael in [Dwight's] situation". Furthermore, she compared the episode to the third-season episode "Women's Appreciation".

Erik Adams of The A.V. Club awarded the episode a "C" and was critical of the episode's focus on "the series' endgame", noting that the episode heavily set up both Jim and Dwight's departure. Dan Forcella of TV Fanatic awarded the episode three-and-a-half stars out of five. While enjoying the story's main plots—specifically citing Angela and Oscar's "sneak around", and Dwight's endeavor—he was critical of Jim's subplot, writing that "I couldn't care less about the issues he was facing with teleconferencing."

Melora Hardin's return garnered critical attention. Forcella wrote that "Jan was definitely a welcome appearance". Furthermore, he praised her "all-around meanness" and the "hilarity of her singing". Houx wrote that "the return of Jan Levinson and the final solution to get her business was pretty good." Adams, on the other hand, was critical of the return of Hardin, noting that "there's little reason to justify Melora Hardin's presence in 'The Whale'" other than "an obligation [for] The Office's final-season victory lap". White noted that it "was nice to see Melora Hardin in the role one last time", but wrote that "it's a shame that the show is sticking with the crazy version of the character rather than mellowing her out a bit". Melora Hardin's performance was later submitted by the producers of The Office for an "Outstanding Guest Actor in Comedy Series" Emmy consideration.
