= Ameenah Kaplan =

American actress

Ameenah Kaplan (born June 17, 1974) is an American actress, musician, and choreographer.

== Early life and education ==
Kaplan was born on June 17, 1974, in Denver, Colorado. She was raised in Atlanta, where she graduated from Avondale High School for the Performing Arts. She also attended Tisch School of the Arts at New York University and trained in their experimental theater wing. She is a graduate of the Academy of Art University film school.

== Career ==
She has been a drummer since age 12 and was a member of the original American cast of STOMP. She was the west coast drum coach for Blue Man Group. She has played drums and/or percussion with Ty Taylor of Vintage Trouble, Adam Lambert, Alisan Porter, Macy Gray, Rihanna, Taylor Hicks, Lisa Haley and the Zydecats, Drake, Leslie Odom Jr., Scarlett Cherry, and the Twinz. She has performed on Oprah, Conan O’Brien, The Academy Awards, the AMAs, the Grammys, and the Tonight Show.

She is the resident director of The Lion King on Broadway.

== Filmography ==
=== Films ===
Year	Title	Role	Notes
1995	Broken Silence	Ashaela	
2002	Pulse: A Stomp Odyssey	—N/a	Documentary short
2011	Apocalypse According to Doris	Serena	
2018	Avengers: Infinity War	Gamora's Mother	
2019	Avengers: Endgame	Gamora Reader	

=== Television ===
Year	Title	Role	Notes
1996	Space Ghost Coast to Coast	—N/a	Episode: "Art Show"
2000	18 Wheels of Justice	Olivia	Episode: "Sleeping Dragons"
2002	Strong Medicine	Patsy	2 episodes
2004	Cold Case	Letitia Castillo	Episode: "Disco Inferno"
2005	Veronica Mars	Loretta Cancun	Episode: "M.A.D."
2007	Hannah Montana	Mom	Episode: "Smells Like Teen Sellout"
2007	Partners	Neighbor	Television film
2009	Medium	Nurse #4	Episode: "Pain Killer"
2009	Heroes	Female Airport Police	Episode: "Shadowboxing"
2011	Harry's Law	Forewoman	Episode: "Pilot"
2011	Mr. Sunshine	Angie	Episode: "Hostile Workplace"
2011	Law & Order: LA	SID Tech	Episode: "Big Rock Mesa"
2011, 2013	Grey's Anatomy	Makena	2 episodes
2011–2013	The Office	Val	14 episodes
2015	Falling Flat	Zoe	Television film
2017	Veep	Female Butler	Episode: "Blurb"

== Choreography ==
Year	Show
2008	Prove It On Me
2009	Oedipus The King, Mama!
2009	Frosty the Snow Manilow
2009	Altar Boyz
2010	The Ballad of Emmett Till
2010	The Women of Brewster Place
2010	CHiPs the Musical
2010	A Wither's Tale
2011	Camino Real
2011	BASH'd! A Gay Rap Opera
2012	In the Red and Brown Water
2014	Facing Our Truth: The Trayvon Martin Plays
2014	Raditatical
