= Last Day in Florida =

- The Office episode
- Episode no.: Season 8 Episode 18
- Directed by: Matt Sohn
- Written by: Robert Padnick
- Cinematography by: Sarah Levy
- Editing by: Colin Johnson; Rob Burnett
- Production code: 818
- Original air date: March 8, 2012

Guest appearances
- David Koechner as Todd Packer; Lindsey Broad as Cathy Simms; Georgia Engel as Irene; Brad Morris as Glenn

Episode chronology
| ← Previous "Test the Store" | Next → "Get the Girl" |
- The Office (American season 8)

"Last Day in Florida" is the eighteenth episode of the eighth season of the American comedy television series The Office and the show's 170th episode overall. The episode originally aired on NBC in the United States on March 8, 2012. "Last Day in Florida" was written by Robert Padnick and directed by Matt Sohn. The episode features the final appearance of Lindsey Broad and guest stars Georgia Engel.

The series—presented as if it were a real documentary—depicts the everyday lives of office employees in the Scranton, Pennsylvania, branch of the fictional Dunder Mifflin Paper Company. In the episode, Robert California (James Spader) reveals he hates Nellie Bertram's (Catherine Tate) business plan and Jim Halpert (John Krasinski) swings into action to keep Dwight Schrute (Rainn Wilson) from getting fired. Meanwhile, Andy Bernard (Ed Helms) learns that Erin Hannon (Ellie Kemper) is not going to return to Scranton. Also, Toby Flenderson (Paul Lieberstein) and Darryl Philbin (Craig Robinson) compete to sell cookies to Kevin (Brian Baumgartner).

"Last Day in Florida" received mixed reviews from critics, with multiple critics praising Wilson and Krasinski's performance. Like the previous episodes involving Florida, the Scranton sub-plot received mixed reviews. According to Nielsen Media Research, "Last Day in Florida" was viewed by an estimated 4.89 million viewers and received a 2.6 rating/7% share among adults between the ages of 18 and 49. The episode ranked second in its timeslot and was also the highest-rated NBC series of the night.

== Synopsis ==
Dwight Schrute celebrates his winning of the Vice President position on a golf outing with Jim Halpert, Robert California, and Nellie Bertram. After playing, Robert tells Jim that he dislikes the business plan for the Sabre store, citing the poor quality of the products; he only approved it because Jo Bennett wanted it. He plans to sandbag it at a high-level meeting, and Jim is stunned when Robert strongly hints he is going to fire Dwight over it. Jim makes several attempts to stop Dwight from attending the meeting with Robert, but Dwight is heedless and, feeling empowered by his promotion, continually insults Jim, who finally decides to leave Dwight to his fate. However, a guilt-inducing phone call to Pam Halpert makes Jim decide he has to tell Dwight what is about to happen, no matter what. Dwight ignores the news, thinking Jim is jealous of him and is pranking him, so Jim resorts to simply wrestling with Dwight outside the conference room. In the meantime, Nellie has Todd Packer stand in as VP in Dwight's absence. When Dwight finally makes it into the conference room, he hears Robert planning to fire the VP, so he sneaks out of the conference room and lets Packer take the fall in front of those present. Humbled, Dwight then silently extends a hand to Jim, and they head back to Scranton with Stanley Hudson, who has reverted to his old grumpy self over the thought of leaving Florida.

In Scranton, Darryl Philbin and Toby Flenderson are both trying to sell Girl Scout cookies for their daughters. When Toby's requests clash with Darryl's, Darryl tells him they need their own sections of the office to sell to in order to not interfere with each other. To Toby’s surprise, Darryl only chooses accounting while Toby gets every other section. Darryl had asked for accounting because Kevin Malone buys more cookies than everyone else put together. Toby eventually realizes Darryl's plan and the two end up fighting over who sells Kevin cookies, with Kevin coming up with absurd competition ideas. After doing a song and dance for Kevin, Kevin still can not make up his mind, so Darryl and Toby contemplate giving up until Kevin mentions he plans to buy hundreds of boxes of cookies, at which point they continue the competition. He has them record a voicemail message for him pretending to be girls who are having sex with him, but they finally give up for good when Kevin wants to ride them like a pony, citing they still want to maintain their dignity and will not go beyond the limit to what they would do for their daughters. When they walk away, Kevin says he will do any absurd thing for them to continue, kissing Meredith Palmer to prove it, but they still refuse.

Andy Bernard learns that Erin Hannon is not coming back to Scranton after she takes a job helping an elderly lady, Irene she met at the Sabre store opening, leaving Andy very distraught, especially when he learns that everyone else already knew through the social media of Ryan Howard, who returned to Scranton after freaking out. When Dwight, Jim, and Stanley return to Scranton and Andy sees Jim happily reunite with Pam, Andy decides to travel to Florida to try to bring Erin back.

== Production ==
"Last Day in Florida" was written by Robert Padnick, his second writing credit for the season after "Gettysburg". The episode was directed by Matt Sohn, his third director's credit for the season after "Pam's Replacement" and "Tallahassee". The episode features a guest appearance from David Koechner, who appears as Todd Packer in the series. He recently made a deal with NBC to do more episodes for the series and also possibly join the cast of series developer Greg Daniels's next series, Friday Night Dinner, an adaption of the British series of the same name. Lindsey Broad, who portrays Cathy Simms, Pam's replacement during her maternity leave, makes her twelfth and final appearance on the series. The episode also marks the second appearance of Georgia Engel as Irene, Erin's elderly new friend. Showrunner Paul Lieberstein said in an interview that he was excited for her appearance calling her performance "fantastic". She appeared in three episodes in the season. The Season Eight DVD contains a number of deleted scenes from this episode. Notable cut scenes include Irene introducing Erin to her grandson who asks Erin to go on a date with him, which she says yes to, and Packer attempting to have a conversation with California over the HBO medieval fantasy series Game of Thrones, but learns Robert has not seen the series.

== Cultural references ==
In the episode, Ryan mentions that he told everybody through his Tumblr account that Erin was not coming back from Florida. Kevin forces Toby and Darryl to sing "Hello! Ma Baby" in the style of Michigan J. Frog. Sabre's Pyramid tablet makes a reappearance in the episode. The device serves as a parody of several tablet computers, specifically the Apple iPad. B. J. Novak described the device as "really the worst piece of technology that you've ever seen." The device was created by Paul Lieberstein, who originally envisioned that the device only had the rights to the 1993 film Coneheads.

== Reception ==
=== Ratings ===
"Last Day in Florida" aired on March 8, 2012. The episode was viewed by an estimated 4.89 million viewers and received a 2.6 rating/7% share among adults between the ages of 18 and 49. This means that it was seen by 2.6% of all 18- to 49-year-olds, and 7% of all 18- to 49-year-olds watching television at the time of the broadcast. This marked a slight rise in the ratings from the previous episode, "Test the Store". The episode finished second in its time slot, beating Fox drama series The Finder and reruns of the ABC medical drama Grey's Anatomy and The CW drama series Supernatural. Despite this, the episode was defeated by the CBS drama Person of Interest. In addition, "Last Day in Florida" was the highest-rated NBC television episode of the night.

=== Reviews ===
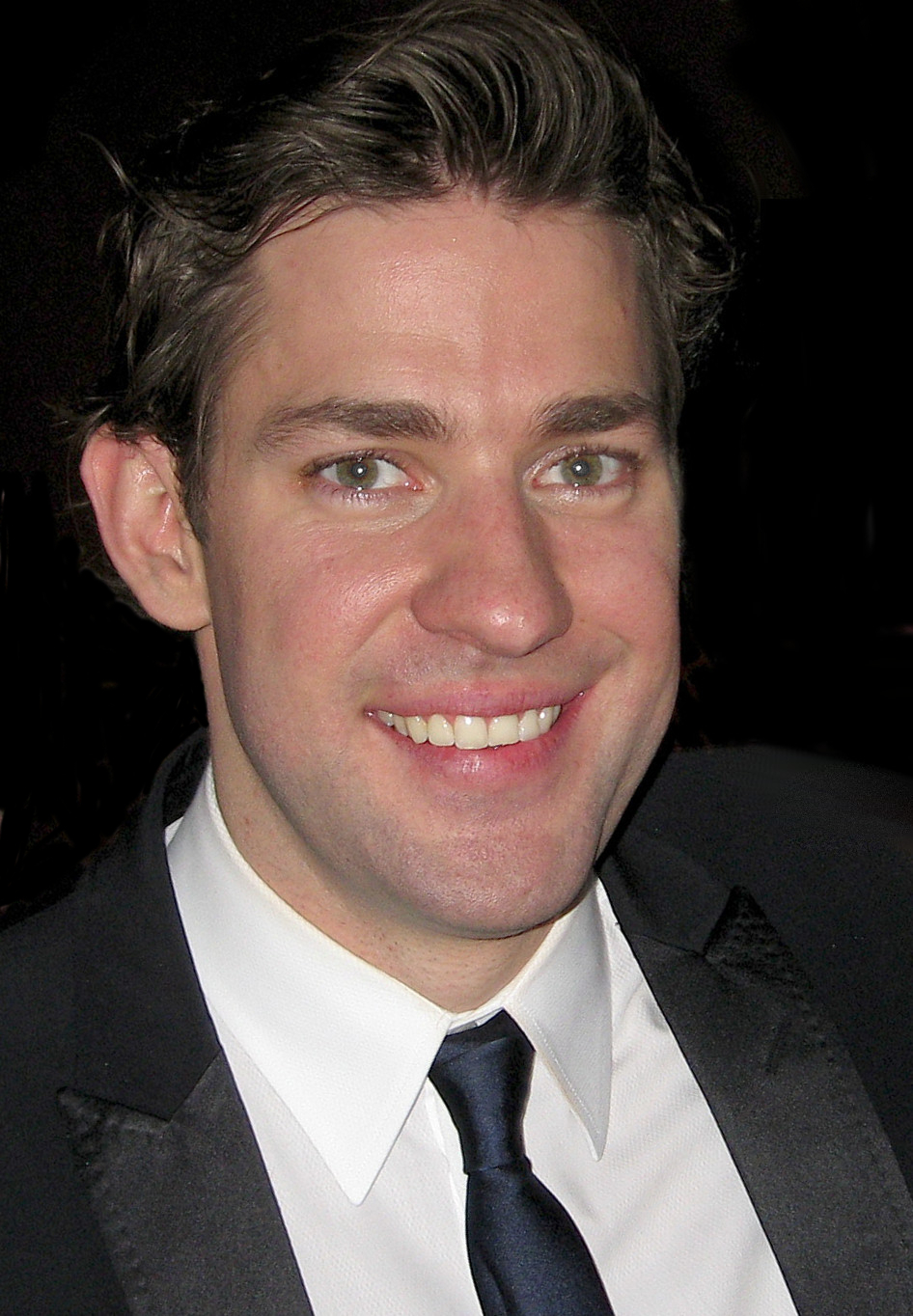
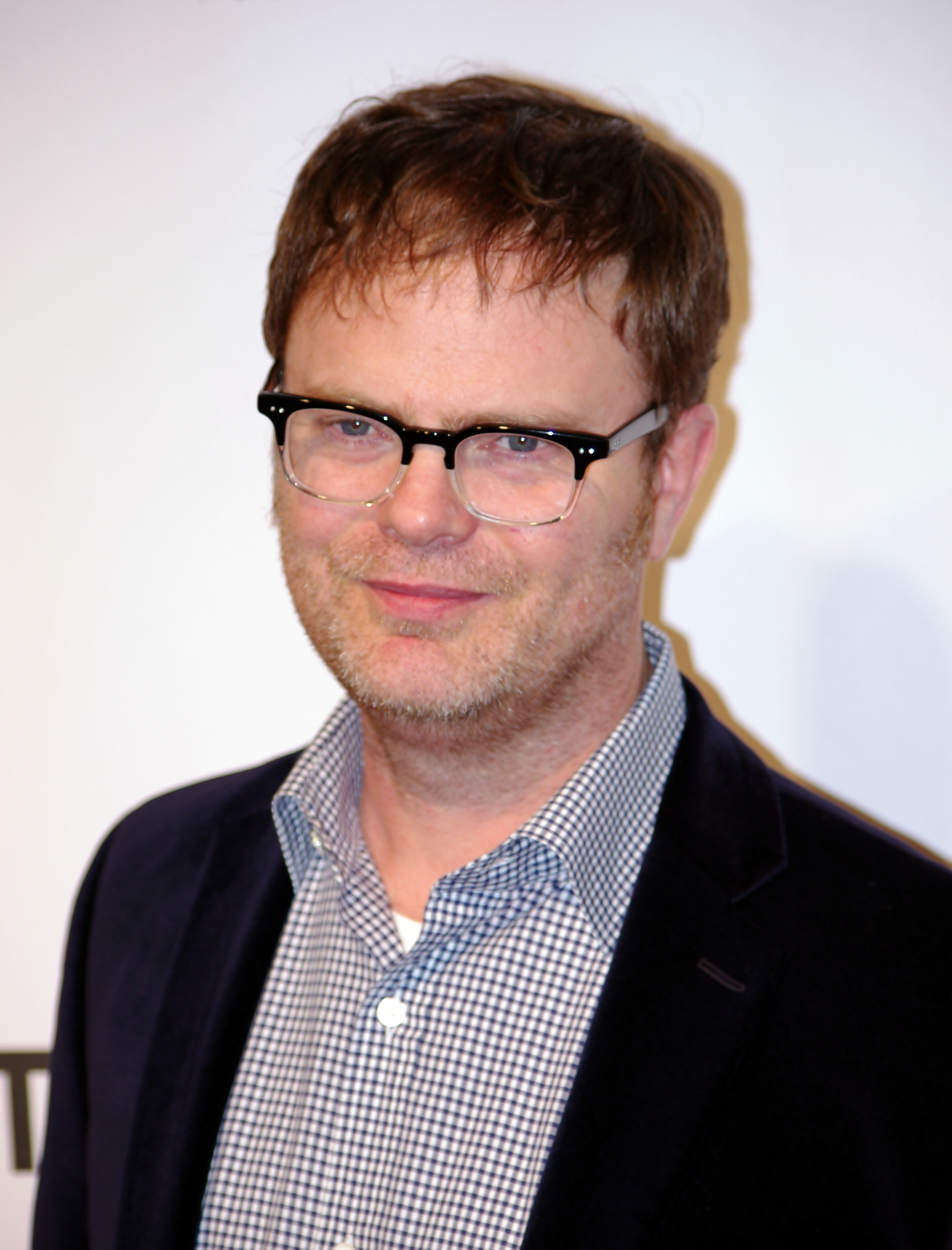
John Krasinski (left) and Rainn Wilson's (right) performances received particularly positive reviews from critics.

"Last Day in Florida" received mixed reviews from critics, with many of them praising Rainn Wilson and John Krasinski's performance in the episode and their characters' interaction. Writing for New York, Michael Tedder called the scene featuring Dwight helping Jim up "eloquent" and wrote that it summarized their relationship over the years. The A.V. Club reviewer Myles McNutt called the episode the "most satisfying episode in the Florida arc", mainly praising the Jim-Dwight relationship, and said that since Steve Carell left the series they have become the "emotional core" of the show. He also complimented the writers for adding "business logic" to Sabre, specifically with Robert criticizing the Sabre Pyramid. Despite mainly praising the Florida plotline, he went on to criticize the Andy-Erin plotline for Erin's incompetence and also the fact he stopped caring about Andy and Erin's relationship, although he did call their video chat "charming". He ultimately gave the episode a B+. Brian Marder of Hollywood.com had a mixed response to the episode and wrote that it ruined the positive momentum the previous two episodes had. He also wrote that the episode was not a good episode until the final scene of Andy telling the camera he is going to Florida to get Erin back, calling the development "half intriguing, half mildly uninteresting".

IGN writer Cindy White considered the Jim and Dwight scenes to be one of the only highlights of the episode, especially due to them being the core element to the series. She criticized Robert's role in the episode and series, calling his character "a tool ... I mean that in both senses", and also wrote that he was too much of an inconsistent character. She concluded that while the episode was not "terrible", it was a mediocre conclusion to the Florida storyline and wrote that "I've got a suspicion that the best part of Season 8 is behind us". She ultimately gave the episode a 7.0/10. Jeffrey Hyatt of Screen Crave gave the episode a review of seven out of ten, writing that the only drawback for the episode was the Scranton subplot, because it "turned really old, really fast", although he did compliment Lieberstein's performance in the episode.

Like the previous episodes, the Scranton subplot received mixed reviews. Tedder called the subplot "typical, but likable". McNutt wrote that while it had good moments, the storyline ultimately felt like "rejected storylines from an old sitcom" while White wrote that she enjoyed the storyline.
