= Angry Andy =

- The Office episode
- Episode no.: Season 8 Episode 21
- Directed by: Claire Scanlon
- Written by: Justin Spitzer
- Cinematography by: Matt Sohn
- Editing by: Claire Scanlon
- Production code: 821
- Original air date: April 19, 2012
- Running time: 22 minutes

Guest appearances
- Sendhil Ramamurthy as Ravi; Mark Proksch as Nate Nickerson

Episode chronology
← Previous "Welcome Party"	Next → "Fundraiser"
- The Office (American season 8)

"Angry Andy" is the twenty-first episode of the eighth season of the American comedy television series The Office. It was written by Justin Spitzer and directed by Claire Scanlon. The episode aired on NBC in the United States on April 19, 2012.

The series—presented as if it were a real documentary—depicts the everyday lives of office employees in the Scranton, Pennsylvania, branch of the fictional Dunder Mifflin Paper Company. In this episode, Andy Bernard (Ed Helms) returns to the office to find Nellie Bertram (Catherine Tate) in the manager's chair. After throwing an extreme tantrum and punching a hole in the wall, Andy is fired. Meanwhile, Kelly is forced to choose between Ryan Howard (B. J. Novak) and a new man, Ravi (Sendhil Ramamurthy).

The episode received a lukewarm response from critics. According to Nielsen Media Research, "Angry Andy" was viewed by an estimated 4.35 million viewers and received a 2.2 rating/6% share among adults between the ages of 18 and 49, making it, at the time, the lowest-rated episode of The Office to air. The episode ranked second in its timeslot and was also the highest-rated NBC series of the night.

== Plot ==
Andy Bernard returns to Dunder Mifflin with Erin Hannon to find Nellie Bertram in the manager's chair. Andy enlists Robert California to give Andy his job back, but Nellie refuses to relinquish the job. Robert backs out of the situation, due to his sexual desire for Nellie. Nellie further asserts her authority when she orders Angela Lipton to dock Andy's paycheck twice, and she complies. This causes Andy to have sexual performance difficulties with Erin. Erin asks Dwight Schrute if he had similar problems after his loss of the manager position, which he denies. After Dwight tells Nellie that she has affected Andy's sex life, she begins to feel guilty. She holds a meeting where the office workers share advice on how to sexually perform with Andy, when it is revealed the meeting is about him. After the meeting, when Nellie makes another innuendo about Andy's problems, Erin loses her temper by yelling at Nellie to shut up, throwing her office phone to the ground, followed by Nellie's memo forms, pens, and her caramel. This gives Andy, filled with anger, the freedom to vent by throwing his desk chair at Robert, smashing Nellie's picture frame to the ground, and finally punching his hand through the wall (as he has done once before). When Robert then chooses Nellie as regional manager, Andy refuses to accept a demotion by saying "no" too many times in a calm way, and a surprised Robert fires him. Though he now has no job, Andy regains his sense of self-confidence and is once again able to perform.

Kelly Kapoor is forced to choose between Ryan Howard and a new man, Ravi. Pam Halpert set up Kelly and Ravi, her daughter Cece's pediatrician, in hopes of Kelly finally moving on from Ryan. Ryan makes several attempts to get back with Kelly, though everyone finds the attempts pathetic because he can not even say he truly loves her and wants to be with her always (he keeps qualifying all of his feelings for her) and even admits he would prefer she not be with anyone else if she is not going to be with him. Warehouse worker Nate even states that he prefers Ravi to Ryan, despite having never met Ravi and only knowing Ryan (whom he calls Brian) from their brief interaction. Pam eventually says that he is not a nice person, and Oscar Martinez says he is not boyfriend material. Ryan tells the office he has a love poem for her, which Kelly has no interest in reading. As the staff are heading outside the building to go home, they see Ryan sitting on a steed professing his love (again, in insultingly hedging terms) to Kelly. She responds by saying she is in love with Ravi and hopes to stay friends with Ryan. They hug goodbye, which turns into a make-out session. The episode closes with Jim Halpert and Pam finding and reading Ryan's love poem. Initially scoffing, they are both noticeably moved by it. Tearing up, Jim informs the camera crew that Ryan can never know of the incident.

== Production ==
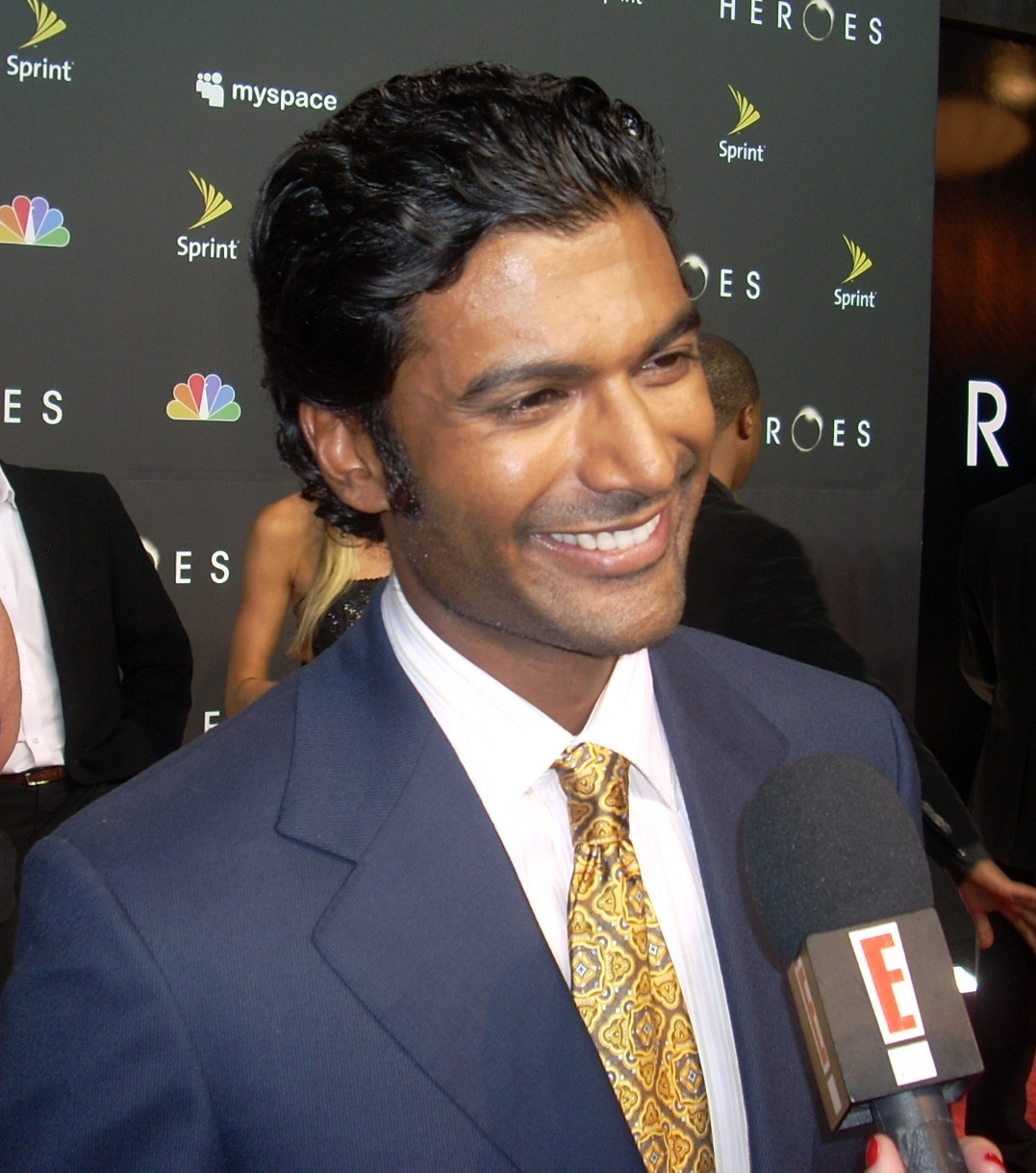
"Angry Andy" guest starred Sendhil Ramamurthy as Ravi.

"Angry Andy" was written by Justin Spitzer, his second writing credit for the season after "Garden Party". The episode was directed by Claire Scanlon, her first credit for the series. The episode guest stars Sendhil Ramamurthy as Ravi, Pam and Jim's pediatrician. Before the premiere of the episode, it was revealed that Ramamurthy would be introduced as a new romantic interest for Mindy Kaling's character Kelly Kapoor. Writer B. J. Novak explained that Ryan and Kelly "go through a heart-wrenching break-up [and the two] end up becoming bitter enemies in the office when she falls in love with an Indian doctor. He's very handsome and a much, much better match for Kelly than Ryan is." TV Fanatic predicted that Ramamurthy's appearance in the show was done so that Kaling could exit the program, due to her commitment to her Fox series The Mindy Project.

== Reception ==
=== Ratings ===
"Angry Andy" originally aired on NBC in the United States on April 26, 2012. The episode was viewed by an estimated 4.35 million viewers and received a 2.2 rating/6% share among adults between the ages of 18 and 49. This means that it was seen by 2.2% of all 18- to 49-year-olds, and 6% of all 18- to 49-year-olds watching television at the time of the broadcast. In addition, the episode was, at the time, the lowest-rated episode of the series to air, beating the previous episode, "Welcome Party", which gathered 4.39 million viewers. The episode finished second in its time slot, being beaten by Grey's Anatomy which received a 3.3 rating/9%. The episode beat the Fox series Touch and The CW drama series The Secret Circle, as well as a re-run of the CBS drama Person of Interest. Despite this, "Angry Andy" was the highest-rated NBC television episode of the night.

=== Reviews ===
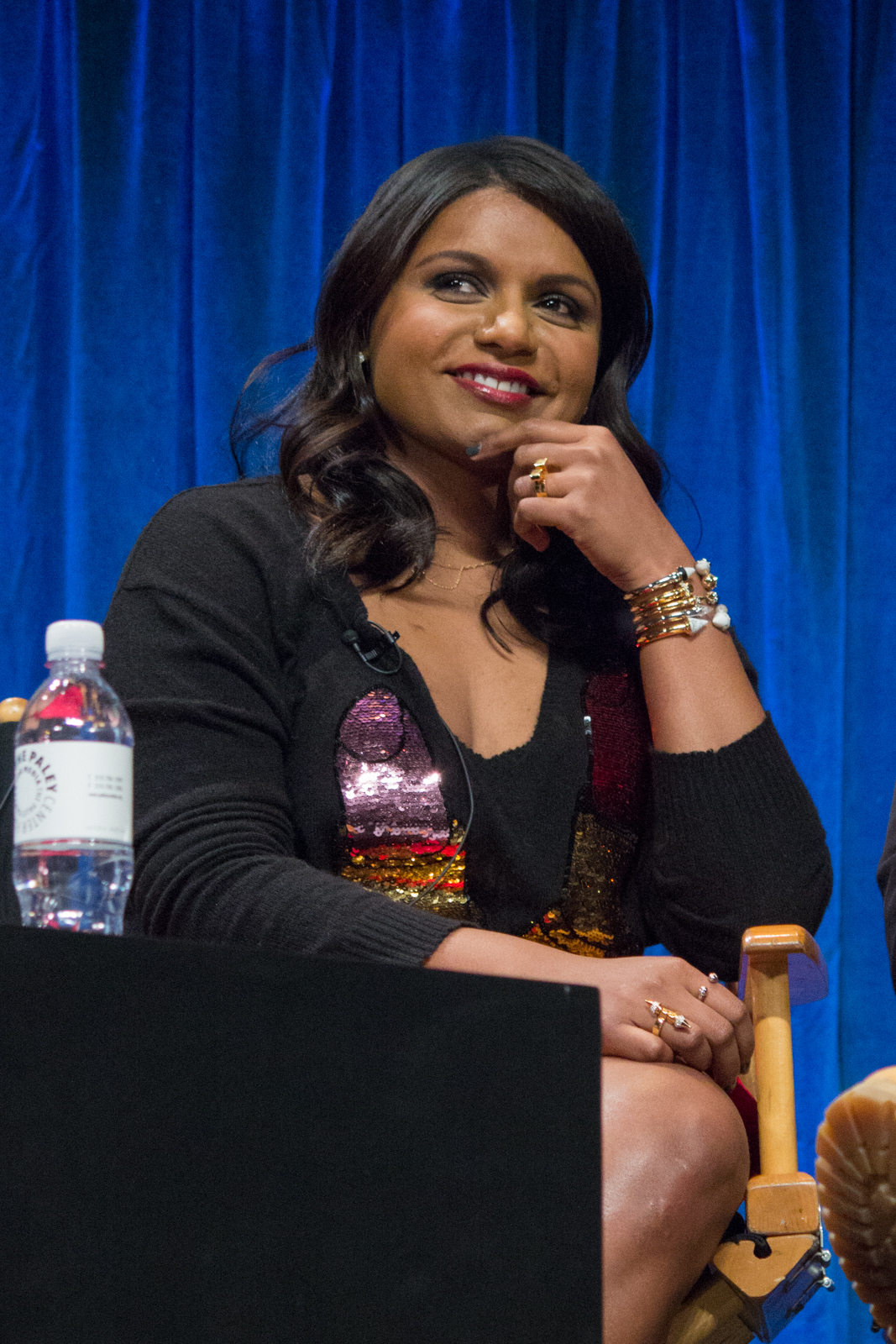
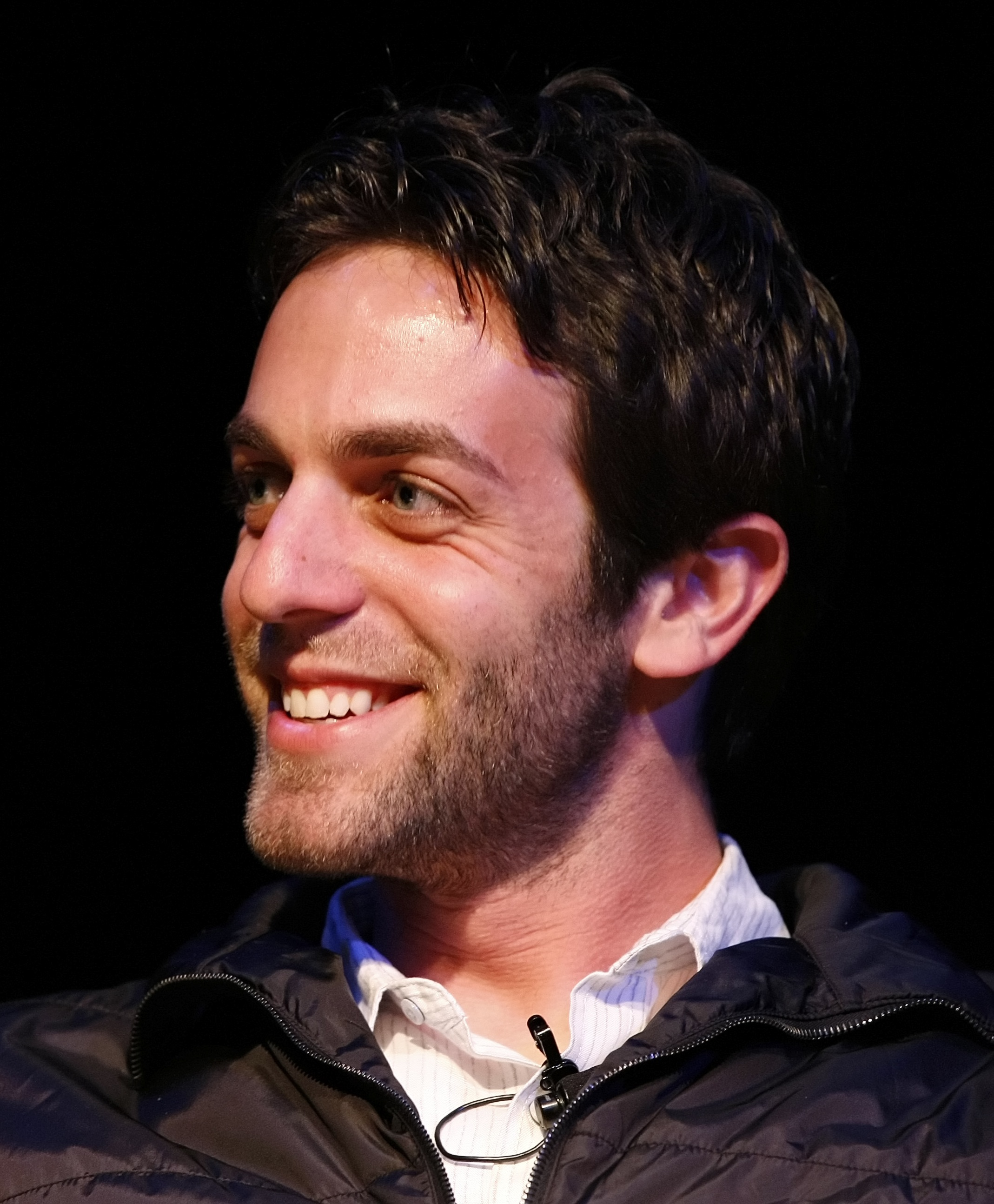
The subplot involving Mindy Kaling (left) and B. J. Novak (right) received particularly positive reviews from critics.

Critical reception to the episode was largely mixed. Myles McNutt of The A.V. Club awarded the entry a "C" and thoroughly criticized Nellie's "hostile takeover" of the Scranton branch, calling it "utterly ridiculous". McNutt also called most of the humorous moments in the episode "too familiar", noting that Andy's punching of a wall had already happened on the show. Cindy White of IGN gave the episode a 7.5 out of 10, denoting a "good" episode, but noted that the show's need to feature a direct flash back to "The Return" only "highlights the lack of [Andy's] character continuity" and concluded that the scene came out "a bit contrived."

M. Giant from Television Without Pity awarded the episode a "C+". Joseph Kratzer of WhatCulture! gave the episode a largely negative review and awarded it two stars out of five. He criticized the plot invoking Nellie taking the manager position away, as well as Erin's outburst, saying "it was warranted but disingenuous". Dan Forcella of TV Fanatic awarded the episode three-and-a-half-stars out of five and noted that the return of Andy's anger issues was a "pleasant change of pace". He concluded that the episode's physical comedy elevated it, ultimately making it "certainly an improvement on last week's episode ['Welcome Party']". Screencrave reviewer Jeffrey Hyatt awarded the episode a seven out ten but noted that Andy's return and his meltdown "didn't wow me", but that his increased ego was impressive.

Critical reception to the episode's subplot involving Kelly and Ryan was largely positive. McNutt called Novak's acting "some of [his] best work in a long time". He called the plot’s conclusion "the sort of screwed up situation that The Office does well". White wrote that "If it weren't for [Kelly and Ravi's] story ... I might have written this clumsy episode off entirely." Forcella enjoyed the plot, praising the ending due to the fact that it concluded with "boos and hisses". However, he was confused with the casting, noting that "why bring Sendhil Ramamurthy in for one scene? ... He seems more like someone you bring in for a multi-episode arc." Hyatt lauded the scenes, and wrote "the Ryan-Kelly stuff I give a 10/10."
