= Welcome Party =

- The Office episode
- Episode no.: Season 8 Episode 20
- Directed by: Ed Helms
- Written by: Steve Hely
- Cinematography by: Matt Sohn
- Editing by: David Rogers
- Production code: 820
- Original air date: April 12, 2012

Guest appearances
- Hugh Dane as Hank Tate; Brett Gelman as The Magician; Eleanor Seigler as Jessica

Episode chronology
← Previous "Get the Girl"	Next → "Angry Andy"
- The Office (American season 8)

"Welcome Party" is the twentieth episode of the eighth season of the American comedy television series The Office and the show's 172nd episode overall. The episode originally aired on NBC in the United States on April 12, 2012. "Welcome Party" was written by Steve Hely and directed by series regular Ed Helms, who portrays Andy Bernard.

The series—presented as if it were a real documentary—depicts the everyday lives of office employees in the Scranton, Pennsylvania, branch of the fictional Dunder Mifflin Paper Company. In this episode, Robert California (James Spader) forces the office to prepare a welcome party for Nellie Bertram (Catherine Tate), but the party planners seek to sabotage it. Meanwhile, Erin Hannon (Ellie Kemper) helps Andy Bernard (Ed Helms) break up with his girlfriend, Jessica.

"Welcome Party" was received differently by many critics, resulting in mixed reviews, with multiple critics feeling that the episode never lived up to its potential. According to Nielsen Media Research, "Welcome Party" was viewed by an estimated 4.39 million viewers and received a 2.2 rating/6% share among adults between the ages of 18 and 49. The episode ranked fourth in its timeslot and was also the highest-rated NBC series of the night.

== Synopsis ==
Robert California forces the office to throw a welcome party for Nellie Bertram, but the Party Planning Committee works on ways to sabotage it. Meanwhile, Jim Halpert and Dwight Schrute are sent to Nellie's apartment to help her move in. When Dwight sarcastically suggests bringing in a magician to move her furniture magically, Nellie quickly admits her disdain for stage magicians, prompting Jim to tell Pam Halpert about hiring a magician for Nellie's party. Jim and Dwight find a shoe box with a note to Nellie from herself saying not to open it. Inside, they find photos of her with another man and deduce him to be an ex-boyfriend. When Nellie finds them with the photos, she explains that she lost everything when they broke up. One of the photos shows him as a stage magician, which they realize is the root of her distaste of magicians. Jim calls Pam back and asks her to reconsider throwing the bad party. Pam tries to convince the other employees to little or no avail.

At the party, the employees vent their hatred of Nellie onto Pam to avoid admitting the truth, making Pam uncomfortable. The magician that was hired arrives, much to Nellie's dismay. Jim and Pam, out of solidarity to Nellie, sabotage the magician's tricks until he reaches breaking point, angrily yelling at everyone, and Dwight kicks him out. Nellie could see what Jim and Pam were doing and smiles gratefully. Nellie and Robert commend the employees for throwing a good party, but Kevin Malone complains that the carrot cake has actual vegetables in it, which Pam made as a prank. When Jim and Pam leave for the day, Pam asks Hank Tate why he let the magician into the elevator when he was asked not to. Hank, busy reading a magazine, claims not to have noticed him, stating that as a magician he could have slipped by.

Andy Bernard and Erin Hannon decide not to get together officially until he breaks up with Jessica. On their way back to Scranton, they stop at Jessica's family's log cabin, where they encounter a bunch of Jessica's friends having a bachelorette party for her sister, and have been drinking extensively. Uncomfortable, Andy and Erin decide to bail, but Jessica returns from her morning run. After staying a while, Andy asks Jessica into the kitchen where she deduces that he is breaking up with her. Erin is surprised however when Jessica said that Andy told her he did not think Erin was relationship material. Andy does not deny saying that, instead opting to claim that he is gay and leaves awkwardly with Erin. In the car, Andy says he made those comments about Erin because he was with Jessica before Erin accepts it and sleeps. Andy decides to head back to the cabin to tell Jessica and her party that he broke up with her because he wanted to be with Erin and that she is relationship material, while Erin stands nearby. Furious, Jessica and her party chase Andy and Erin back to the car. Erin passionately kisses Andy inside the car while the party throws things at their vehicle, prompting a quick getaway.

== Production ==
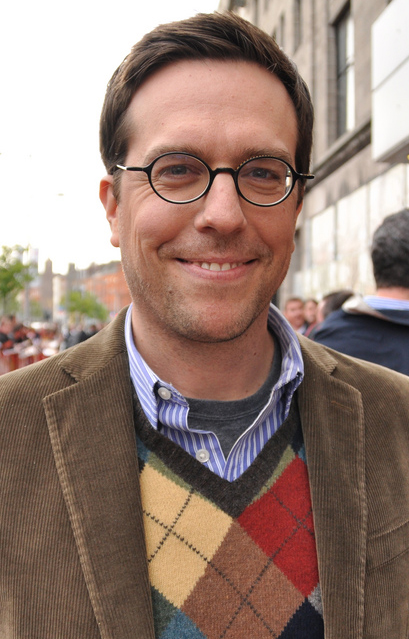
"Welcome Party" was directed by Ed Helms.

"Welcome Party" was written by Steve Hely, his second writing credit for the season after "Trivia". The episode was directed by series regular Ed Helms, who portrays Andy Bernard. This marked his second director's credit for both the series and season, after "Christmas Wishes".

The Season Eight DVD contains a number of deleted scenes from this episode. Notable cut scenes include Jim trying to stall Nellie, Robert California asking the party planning committee how great the party will be, Nellie checking out her new neighbors and asking her neighbor if he is an abortion care provider, in order to make sure her building will not be the target of a fire-bombing, and the party planning committee trying to think of catty ways to make Nellie angry.

== Reception ==
=== Ratings ===
"Welcome Party" originally aired on NBC in the United States on April 12, 2012. The episode was viewed by an estimated 4.39 million viewers and received a 2.2 rating/6% share among adults between the ages of 18 and 49. This means that it was seen by 2.2% of all 18- to 49-year-olds, and 6% of all 18- to 49-year-olds watching television at the time of the broadcast. This marked a slight drop in the ratings from the previous episode, "Get the Girl". "Welcome Party" was ranked as the lowest-rated episode of the series in the 18–49 demographic, beating the first-season finale, "Hot Girl", "Tallahassee" and "Get the Girl". The episode finished fourth in its time slot, only beating The CW drama series, Supernatural. The episode was defeated by the Fox drama series Touch, ABC medical drama Grey's Anatomy and a rerun of the CBS sitcom, The Big Bang Theory.

=== Review ===
"Welcome Party" received mixed reviews from critics. The A.V. Club reviewer Myles McNutt wrote that while the series had two goals to perform by the end of the episode—to turn Nellie into a relatable character and break Andy and Jessica up—he felt that both plots failed in execution. He wrote that because the audience knew nothing about Jessica and that he had "already given up on" Nellie as a character, the episode ultimately became an "'unfunny' experience". He ultimately gave the episode a C. Cindy White of IGN compared the writer's attempt to humanize Nellie to the previous seasons, specifically "The Dundies" when the writers humanized Michael and wrote that she hoped the writers would continue to do this with Nellie. She also went on to praise the interaction between Jim and Pam, saying "Their ability ... to communicate volumes with a few words or merely a glance demonstrates why their chemistry has been so difficult to replicate with other couples." Despite her mainly positive review, she criticized the Andy and Erin subplot because she neither cared about Jessica nor Andy and Erin's relationship and called the whole subplot "a waste of time". She ultimately gave the episode a 7.5/10, calling it "Good". Writing for New York, Lucy Teitler unfavorably compared the Andy-Erin plotline to Jim and Pam's from the early seasons of the series, writing that the romance was not able to "take off, because Erin has no real agency" and that the scene where Andy returned to the bachelorette party felt too superficial to reach its potential of becoming a "classic" Office scene.

The cold open received particularly positive reviews from critics. Myles McNutt called it "clever" and noted that even he had forgotten whether Stanley had a mustache. Lucy Teitler positively compared it to Guys and Dolls. Cindy White considered a "great ensemble bit" and that it showed promise for the episode, although it did not reach that promise.
