= Test the Store =

- The Office episode
- Episode no.: Season 8 Episode 17
- Directed by: Brent Forrester
- Written by: Mindy Kaling
- Cinematography by: Matt Sohn
- Editing by: Claire Scanlon
- Production code: 817
- Original air date: March 1, 2012

Guest appearances
- David Koechner as Todd Packer; Lindsey Broad as Cathy Simms; Tig Notaro as Mom; Georgia Engel as Irene

Episode chronology
| ← Previous "After Hours" | Next → "Last Day in Florida" |
- The Office (American season 8)

"Test the Store" is the seventeenth episode of the eighth season of the American comedy television series The Office and the show's 169th episode overall. The episode was written by Mindy Kaling, directed by Brent Forrester, and aired on NBC in the United States on March 1, 2012.

The series—presented as if it were a real documentary—depicts the everyday lives of office employees in the Scranton, Pennsylvania, branch of the fictional Dunder Mifflin Paper Company. In the episode, Dwight Schrute (Rainn Wilson) attempts to put on a theatrical presentation to impress Nellie Bertram (Catherine Tate). Meanwhile, in Scranton, Andy Bernard (Ed Helms) comes to work with an embarrassing black eye.

"Test the Store" contains many cultural allusions, including several to the NBC action-comedy series Chuck. The episode received mixed reviews from critics. According to the Nielsen Media Research, "Test the Store" was viewed by an estimated 4.95 million viewers and received a 2.5 rating/7% share among adults between the ages of 18 and 49. The episode ranked first in its time slot and was also ranked as the highest-rated NBC program of the night.

== Synopsis ==
At the Sabre store opening, Dwight Schrute attempts to put on a theatrical presentation to impress Nellie Bertram. Dwight assigns the members of his team various tasks: Erin Hannon is to act like a hipster to make the Sabre Pyramid more appealing to other hipsters, Cathy is to flirt with the bloggers, Ryan Howard is to give a presentation to wow the critics, and Todd Packer is to play the part of a sexual predator who "prey[s] on the trendy teenage girls who are obsessed with the pyramid"—much to Packer's chagrin. As the grand opening progresses, things begin to fall apart. Several bloggers notice Jim Halpert using his old cell phone instead of his Sabre Arrowhead phone, resulting in a reprimand from Nellie. Erin disappears with a group of seniors after Dwight drives them away, fearing their age will frighten the youth. Ryan has a panic attack and, after being consoled by Dwight and Jim — who imitate Kelly Kapoor and his mother respectively in an attempt to calm him down — leaves to go to his parents' house. Jim is forced to give the presentation, which, despite a rocky start, impresses the crowd. After the opening, Dwight is named vice president by Nellie.

In Scranton, Andy Bernard tries to protect Pam Halpert from a group of kids who are throwing pinecones at her, and a young girl, Tiffany, punches him, giving him a black eye. Andy tells his co-workers that he stepped in when a "gang" harassed Pam, and Pam plays along out of gratitude to Andy and not wanting to embarrass him. At Andy's suggestion, Toby Flenderson arranges a meeting in the conference room to discuss self-defense. Andy is then humiliated when Tiffany is brought in by her mother and half-apologizes to him and Pam. Kelly asks Toby to demonstrate how to defend oneself when being attacked by a girl, and begins physically harassing him; Andy steps in between the two to break the fight up, resulting in his other eye being blackened. The rest of the office laughs at his misfortune, but shuts up when Andy points out he got hit twice because he defended other people who were being attacked. The episode concludes with Andy noting that he took a bunch of pain medication, drank half a bottle of wine, and took his pants off, thus greatly improving his feelings as the day ends.

== Production ==
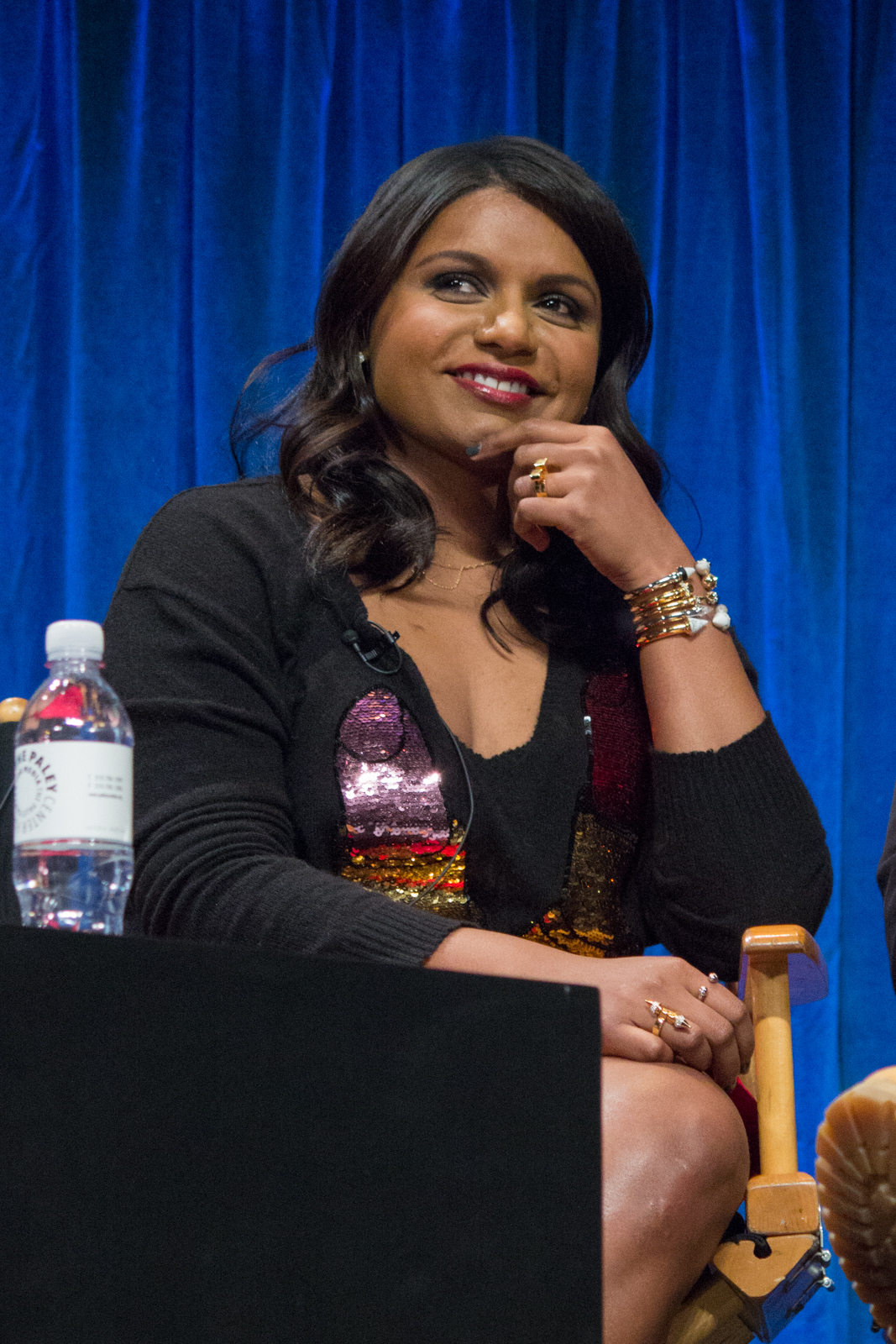
"Test the Store" was written by Mindy Kaling, who portrays Kelly Kapoor on the show.

"Test the Store" was written by executive producer Mindy Kaling, her second script of the eighth season after the Christmas special, "Christmas Wishes." The episode was directed by consulting producer and series writer Brent Forrester. Matt Selman and Matt Warburton, writers for the long-running animated comedy series The Simpsons, appeared in the episode as bloggers. The episode also features a guest appearance from David Koechner, who appears as Todd Packer in the series. He recently had made a deal with NBC to do more episodes for the series and also possibly join the cast of series developer Greg Daniels's next series, Friday Night Dinner, an adaption of the British series of the same name.

The episode also marks the eleventh appearance of Lindsey Broad who plays Cathy, Pam's replacement during her maternity leave. She appeared in a recurring role for the season, after she initially appeared in "Pam's Replacement". The Season Eight DVD contains a number of deleted scenes from this episode. Notable cut scenes include Erin and the senior citizen that she forcibly removed from the Sabre store discussing rent payments over pretzels, Nellie and Dwight lying and telling the team that they went to church, Jim and Cathy having an awkward moment, and Stanley attempting to convince a group of bloggers that he is Al Roker's brother and Raven-Symoné's father.

== Cultural references ==
"Test the Store" featured several direct allusions and references to the action-comedy series Chuck, which had just finished its five-season run on NBC on January 27, 2012. In the episode, a cut-out of Zachary Levi is used by the sales team to garner support for the Sabre Pyramid; Jim and Dwight both mention that Jim was originally supposed to dress as the titular character Chuck; during Jim's presentation, Jim mentions that the Sabre Pyramid has the capability to watch movies and TV shows ranging from "Chuck to Cars 2"; and lastly, Dwight admits to Nellie that the before-mentioned presentation could have used more Chuck references.

As evidenced by the title, Sabre's Pyramid tablet makes a reappearance. The device serves as a parody of several tablet computers, specifically the Apple iPad. B. J. Novak described the device as "really the worst piece of technology that you've ever seen." The device was created by Paul Lieberstein, who originally envisioned that the device only had the rights to the 1993 film Coneheads. The concept was then expanded and changed: the Pyramid would only have the rights to Chuck and Cars 2.

The episode contains several direct mentions to popular music. Nellie mentions that, when she was younger, she tried out for the Spice Girls, failing to secure a call-back for "the black one." During Jim's presentation, the opening of the song "Clocks" by the British rock band Coldplay is played. When pretending to be a hipster, Erin mispronounces both Coachella and Zooey Deschanel.

== Reception ==
=== Ratings ===
"Test the Store" originally aired on NBC in the United States on March 1, 2012. The episode was viewed by an estimated 4.95 million viewers and received a 2.5 rating/7% share among adults between the ages of 18 and 49. This means that it was seen by 2.5% of all 18- to 49-year-olds, and 7% of all 18- to 49-year-olds watching television at the time of the broadcast. The episode finished first in its time slot, beating re-runs of the CBS drama Person of Interest, the ABC medical drama Grey's Anatomy, and The CW drama series Supernatural. In addition, "Test the Store" was the highest-rated NBC television episode of the night.

=== Reviews ===
The episode received mostly mixed reviews from critics. Myles McNutt from The A.V. Club awarded the episode a C rating, noting that "'Test the Store' was just too dumb to build any further momentum; I wish I had a better word for it, but I just can't think of one." However, McNutt appreciated Jim's presentation, noting that "the final presentation was a pretty decent setpiece." What Culture! reviewer Joseph Kratzer awarded the episode three out of five stars, noting that the episode fell victim to "the overall lack of focus and believability that has plagued The Office all season." Jeffrey Hyatt from Screen Crave gave the episode a review of seven out of ten, noting that "The Office continues to get the comedy boost it needs from the Florida storyline." Hyatt called the scene featuring Dwight and Jim imitating Kelly and Ryan's mom as "one of my favorite moments of the season so far." Despite this, he did call the episode "uneven," noting that the Scranton story-line was "ho-hum." Dan Forcella from TV Fanatic awarded the episode four out of five stars and praised Jim's presentation, writing, "Between Jim's outfit and makeup, the fact that he embraced the presentation throughout, and all of the Chuck references, I was speechless by the end of that thing."

Many reviews were critical of the Scranton sub-plot. McNutt wrote that, "Andy getting hit by a girl plays into the most weak, infantile parts of his character, and making Pam his accomplice was a complete non-starter." Kratzer wrote, "Don't get me wrong, the idea of Andy getting punched in the face by a female fifth grader isn't necessarily unbelievable or unfunny, it's just that it had so little relevance or realism that it was difficult to follow for more than five minutes and it constituted an entire plot line."
