= Jury Duty (The Office) =

- The Office episode
- Episode no.: Season 8 Episode 13
- Directed by: Eric Appel
- Written by: Aaron Shure
- Cinematography by: Matt Sohn
- Editing by: Rob Burnett; Colin Johnson
- Production code: 813
- Original air date: February 2, 2012

Guest appearances
- Jack Coleman as Robert Lipton; Lindsey Broad as Cathy Simms; Ameenah Kaplan as Val Johnson; Mark Proksch as Nate Nickerson

Episode chronology
← Previous "Pool Party"	Next → "Special Project"
- The Office (American season 8)

"Jury Duty" is the thirteenth episode of the eighth season of the American comedy television series The Office and the show's 165th episode overall, airing on NBC in the United States on February 2, 2012. It was written by Aaron Shure and directed by Eric Appel, and guest starred Jack Coleman, Lindsey Broad, and Mark Proksch.

The series, presented as if it were a real documentary, depicts the everyday lives of office employees in the Scranton, Pennsylvania, branch of the fictional Dunder Mifflin Paper Company. In this episode, Jim Halpert (John Krasinski) returns from jury duty and Dwight Schrute (Rainn Wilson) questions him on every detail of his case. However, Jim later comes under fire when Dwight reveals he only served half a day on his single case then took the rest of the week off to spend time with his wife, Pam Halpert (Jenna Fischer), looking after their toddler and new baby, Phillip. Meanwhile, Angela (Angela Kinsey) and the state senator welcome an infant son.

"Jury Duty" marks the first appearance of Fischer since "Gettysburg", when her character went on maternity leave. "Jury Duty" received mostly positive reviews from critics, with many reviews noting that the episode was a step in the right direction for the show. According to Nielsen Media Research, "Jury Duty" drew 5.31 million viewers and received a 2.8 rating/7% share in the 18–49 demographic, marking a 10% drop in ratings from the previous episode, "Pool Party". Despite this, it was the highest-rated NBC series of the night.

== Synopsis ==
Jim Halpert returns from jury duty and learns that, in his week-long absence, his co-workers were forced to pick up the slack his prolonged and unanticipated absence created. Jim reveals to the camera that, while he was called for duty, he was dismissed at noon on the first day and headed home to Pam and their two children; he saw that Pam was overwhelmed and took the rest of the week off to help take care of their children. He finds that his co-workers suffered various inconveniences covering for him, making him feel guilty. To appease his interested co-workers, Jim fabricates numerous details of his jury duty, and Dwight Schrute becomes suspicious when Jim mistakenly refers to a food truck franchise Toby Flenderson ate at during his jury duty as a "restaurant". After finding a small inconsistency in Jim's story, Dwight accuses Jim of lying about jury duty and extracts from Andy Bernard a promise to fire Jim if he proves he is correct. Ashamed, Jim privately admits the truth to Andy, who insists that they keep the matter a secret so that he will not be held to his promise. However, Dwight increases his attempts to prove Jim's guilt, and Jim finally decides to defy Andy's orders and tell his co-workers the truth rather than wait for Dwight to inevitably expose him. While this angers most of the employees, Dwight is thrilled at the confession and demands that Andy keep his promise to fire Jim. Andy refuses, so Dwight tries to contact Gabe Lewis. To smooth things over, Jim and Pam bring in their children, Cece and Phillip, and present pictures that Cece drew for the co-workers. It becomes clear that Jim and Pam drew the pictures themselves, but before the members of the office can berate the couple, the children begin crying loudly, creating a cacophony that Jim and Pam struggle to control, forcing them to take the children back to the car. Realizing the stress that having young kids causes, the office workers ultimately forgive Jim for his behavior and allow him to leave early to help Pam.

Angela Lipton and her husband, state senator Robert, welcome their new baby, also named Phillip. Oscar Martinez, Kevin Malone, Erin Hannon, and Gabe all visit Angela at the hospital. According to Angela, the baby was born prematurely, but due to the size, Oscar deduces that Angela lied about the date of conception. Angela admits that the baby was conceived before her wedding, and makes Oscar promise not to tell anyone. Suspecting that Dwight is the real father, Oscar breaks his promise and tells him when he arrives at the hospital in search of Gabe. Dwight barges in on Angela and her husband and begins thoroughly examining the child. When the senator leaves, Dwight confronts Angela about the child, claiming that it is his. She refutes his claim, but Dwight leaves satisfied, telling the attending nurse to call off the baby's circumcision, which the nonplussed nurse refuses to do. Upon returning to Dunder Mifflin he drops his dispute with Jim, since his self-assumed fatherhood has given him a new appreciation for the duties of parenthood. The episode ends with Dwight putting a decal on his car, in honor of his covert new family member.

== Production ==
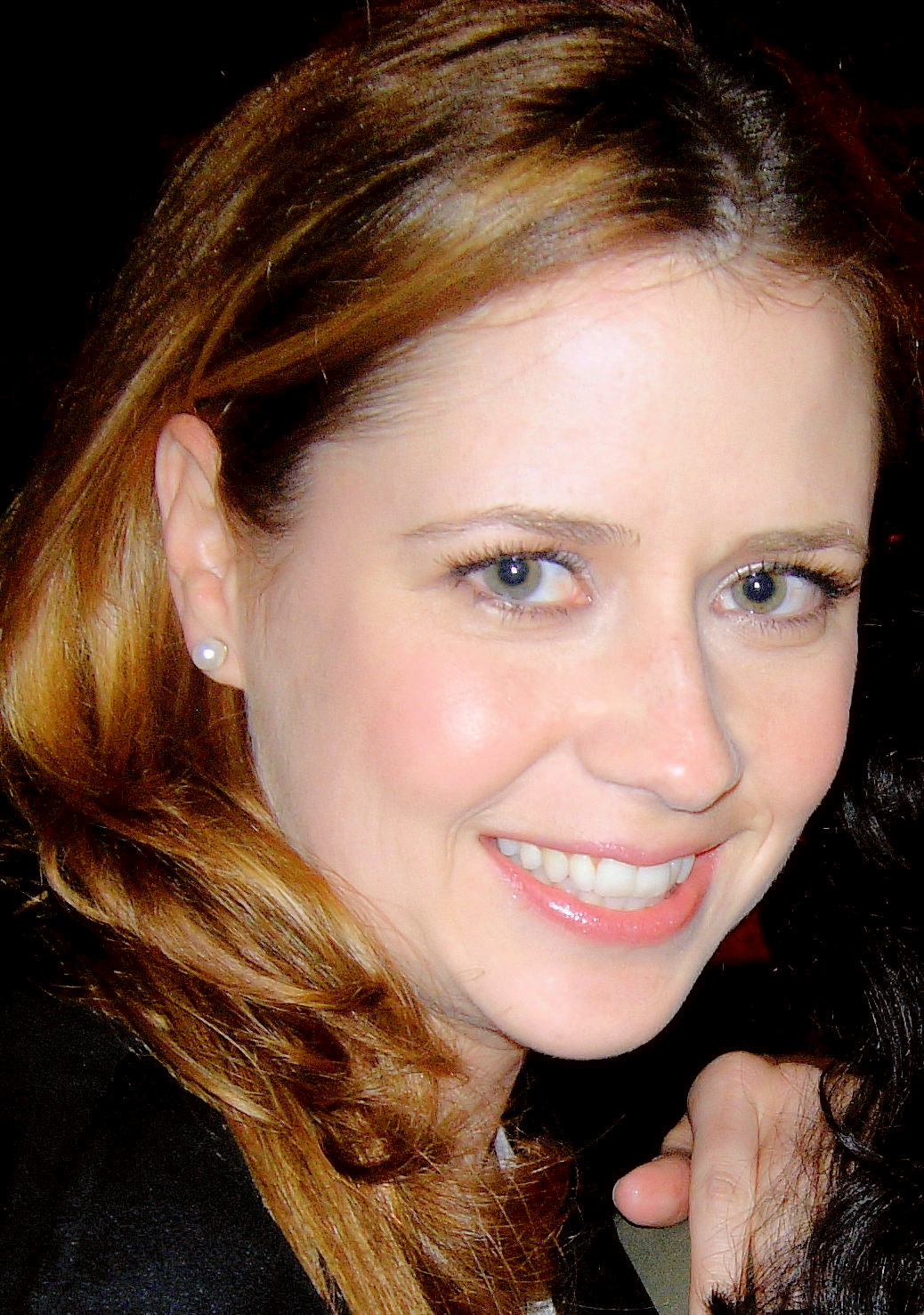
"Jury Duty" marked the first episode of The Office to feature Jenna Fischer since "Gettysburg."

"Jury Duty" was written by consulting producer Aaron Shure, his sixth writing credit for the series after joining the writing staff in the fifth season. It was directed by Eric Appel, his first directing credit for the series. The episode features a guest appearance from Jack Coleman as Senator Robert Lipton, Angela's husband, who first appeared in the seventh season episode, "WUPHF.com". The episode marks the first appearance of Jenna Fischer since "Gettysburg". Due to her pregnancy, she was on maternity leave for four episodes. Her pregnancy was written into the series, with Pam and Jim having their second baby. Unlike the sixth season, there was no episode focusing on the baby's birth; it was instead announced on a blog. According to showrunner Paul Lieberstein, she will come back "with very little fanfare". The episode also marks the seventh appearance of Lindsey Broad, who plays Cathy, Pam's replacement during her maternity leave. She appeared in a recurring role for the season, after she initially appeared in "Pam's Replacement". The Season Eight DVD contains a number of deleted scenes from this episode. Notable cut scenes include Andy getting a friend of his, who starred in the Scranton production of Sweeney Todd, to pretend to be a police officer, only to have Darryl uncover the truth, Dwight telling the camera about a recurring nightmare where he is on trial and all of his co-workers are the members of the jury, and Jim trying to make it up to the office by buying all of the despised black licorice from the vending machines so that the rest of the office has access to the red licorice. However, his plan goes awry and his co-workers make him eat all of the black licorice as punishment.

== Cultural references ==
Several television shows, movies, and video games were referenced. Andy compares stress to a mayor who decrees it is illegal to dance—as in the plot of Footloose—and relieves his stress by dancing to the film's title song. Stanley complains that, after working late for Jim, he was forced to watch Rizzoli & Isles with his wife. Andy refers to Jim as "Judge Judy" when he asks what his jury case was about. Dwight mentions that Jim once tricked him into believing he had been chosen to appear in the popular police procedural drama NCIS. Kevin tells Angela that he bought her new baby Call of Duty, a popular first-person shooter video game.

== Reception ==
=== Ratings ===
"Jury Duty" originally aired on NBC in the United States on February 2, 2012. This was the first episode to air on Global TV in Canada on its new date, Wednesday, February 1, 2012. In the US, the episode was viewed by an estimated 5.31 million viewers and received a 2.8 rating/7% share among adults between the ages of 18 and 49. This means that it was seen by 2.8% of all 18- to 49-year-olds, and 7% of all 18- to 49-year-olds watching television at the time of the broadcast. This marked a 10% drop in the ratings from the previous episode, "Pool Party". The episode also became the lowest-rated episode of the series to air on Thursday. The episode finished third in its time slot, being beaten by Grey's Anatomy which received a 3.6 rating/9% share and the CBS drama Person of Interest which received a 3.3 rating/9% share in the 18–49 demographic. The episode beat the Fox drama series The Finder and The CW drama series The Secret Circle. Despite ranking number three, the episode ranked number one in the adults and men 18–34 time slot. In addition, "Jury Duty" was the highest-rated NBC television episode of the night.

=== Reviews ===
"Jury Duty" received mostly positive reviews from critics and was considered by many critics to be a major step in the right direction for the series. Brian Marder from the New York Post wrote that, "['Jury Duty'] was a step, if not a leap, in the right direction for the show—which, let's be honest, is showing its fatigue and staleness; possibly nearing its end; clearly suffering without Steve Carell." Craig McQuinn from The Faster Times gave the episode a positive review, calling the episode "fun and surprisingly sweet." McQuinn enjoyed the episode's developments, most notably the idea that both Jim and Dwight can bond as fathers and explained that he hoped the producers would not "forget about it like almost every other development this season." New York writer Michael Tedder complimented the writers for improving on the first half of the season and wrote that the episode felt more "tightly written". He also complimented Krasinski's "understated" performance as well as Wilson's acting, citing the scene near the end of the episode wherein Dwight learns Angela's baby might be his. Despite this, he criticized the cold opening and the "miming chill pill" scene. Lizzie Fuhr from BuzzSugar gave the episode a glowing review, saying, "After a solid cold opening of Andy dancing ..., the rest of this week's episode of The Office is a success. ... This is one of my favorite episodes I can remember in a long time. Not too plot driven and chock-full of solid comedic writing plus a handful endearing moments that just made me feel good. To get a few of my favorite lines, just keep reading." Myles McNutt from The A.V. Club gave the episode a B− rating and, although commenting on the lack of stakes for the characters, remarked that, "'Jury Duty' had a certain confidence to it. It may not have satisfyingly explored Jim’s character, but it ended with a clear statement of his role as a father, reintroducing Jenna Fischer into the cast and putting a button on that particular story development."

However, several critics gave the episode a mixed review. Dan Forcella from TVFanatic gave the episode a 3.5 out of 5 stars and wrote, "there were definitely some ups and some downs in 'Jury Duty'." However, he did praise the action of several characters, most notably Kevin and Dwight. Joseph Kratzer from WhatCulture gave the episode 3 out of 5 stars and wrote, "I truly appreciate the talented writing of Aaron Shure who crafted a genuinely well-structured episode. I guess I just didn’t feel like Jim’s story held any actual stakes and Dwight’s just felt random."
