= Tallahassee (The Office) =

- The Office episode
- Episode no.: Season 8 Episode 15
- Directed by: Matt Sohn
- Written by: Daniel Chun
- Cinematography by: Sarah Levy
- Editing by: Claire Scanlon
- Production code: 815
- Original air date: February 16, 2012

Guest appearances
- David Koechner as Todd Packer; Wally Amos as himself; Lindsey Broad as Cathy Simms

Episode chronology
← Previous "Special Project"	Next → "After Hours"
- The Office (American season 8)

"Tallahassee" is the fifteenth episode of the eighth season of the American comedy television series The Office and the show's 167th episode overall. The episode aired on NBC in the United States on February 16, 2012. "Tallahassee" was written by co-executive producer Daniel Chun and directed by series cinematographer Matt Sohn. The episode guest stars David Koechner and Wally Amos.

The series—presented as if it were a real documentary—depicts the everyday lives of office employees in the Scranton, Pennsylvania, branch of the fictional Dunder Mifflin Paper Company. In this episode, Dwight returns to Tallahassee to meet with the president of Sabre's special projects, Nellie Bertram (Catherine Tate). Meanwhile, in Scranton, Andy fills in for reception and thoroughly enjoys himself.

"Tallahassee" saw the reappearance of Tate as Nellie Bertram. Tate had previously appeared in the seventh season finale, "Search Committee". The episode received mostly positive reviews from critics, with many reviewers noting that the "special projects" storyline helped to give the series a focus. The cold opening, in particular, received significant attention from critics, with many calling it the best of the show's eighth season. According to Nielsen Media Research, "Tallahassee" drew 4.38 million viewers and received a 2.3 rating/6% share in the 18–49 demographic, marking a 12% drop in ratings from the previous episode, "Special Project", and becoming the lowest-rated episode of the series to air, beating the previous record holder, "Hot Girl." Despite this, it was the highest-rated NBC series of the night.

== Synopsis ==
Dwight Schrute, Jim Halpert, Stanley Hudson, Cathy Simms, Ryan Howard and Erin Hannon travel to Tallahassee as part of a team picked for Sabre's new project. On the day of orientation, Dwight wakes everyone up at 5 o'clock in various disruptive ways. Jim, used to waking up at four AM to take care of his children, uses the extra time to stage a murder scene in his room, in order to prank Dwight. He scrawls "It was Dwight" in fake blood on the wall to make it look like Dwight murdered him, and falls out of the closet pretending to be dead.

Jim discovers another side of Stanley, who demonstrates uncharacteristic energy and zeal for life. Stanley explains this is because he is on vacation and away from his family, and offers Jim alcohol at various points during the day. At the orientation meeting, Dwight and Jim find that Todd Packer is still working at the company after the two of them attempted to get him fired. The president of Sabre's special projects, Nellie Bertram begins to talk about the project, which encompasses creating a store to rival Apple's chain of stores, and Dwight and Packer start to compete to see who will become her vice president. However, Dwight begins having stomach pains, which Ryan suspects to be appendicitis. Not wanting to be counted out for the vice manager position, Dwight stays at the meeting, but collapses during a presentation. The paramedics confirm appendicitis, and Dwight is rushed into surgery. However, three hours later, after getting his appendix removed, he returns in order to impress his new boss. After nearly butchering a slide-show presentation, he finally impresses Nellie by telling the audience that the only element of marketing that matters is "desire." Nellie subsequently invites Packer and Dwight to have breakfast with her the following day, and Dwight is pleased that he established himself as a candidate and that he can give his appendix to his suspected son as a souvenir. Wally Amos is invited to give a speech on proper business building, but everyone is distracted by the cookies he brought, and Nellie cuts off his speech.

In Scranton, the office is left without a receptionist. Not wanting to get roped into being receptionist again, Pam Halpert defies Andy Bernard's orders to answer the phone. With the rest of the staff similarly declining to answer the phone, Andy is left with no choice but to take on the receptionist's role himself, and performs the job with unexpected gusto. He orders new magazines for the waiting area, cooks mini-pizzas as reception snacks, color-coordinates the desk, and brings in a mail cart to deliver mail. Pam and Darryl Philbin attempt to talk him out of his newfound enjoyment, believing it to be linked to his lingering feelings for Erin, to no success. At the end of the day, a caller mentions that she misses Erin, to which Andy tells her that he does too.

== Production ==
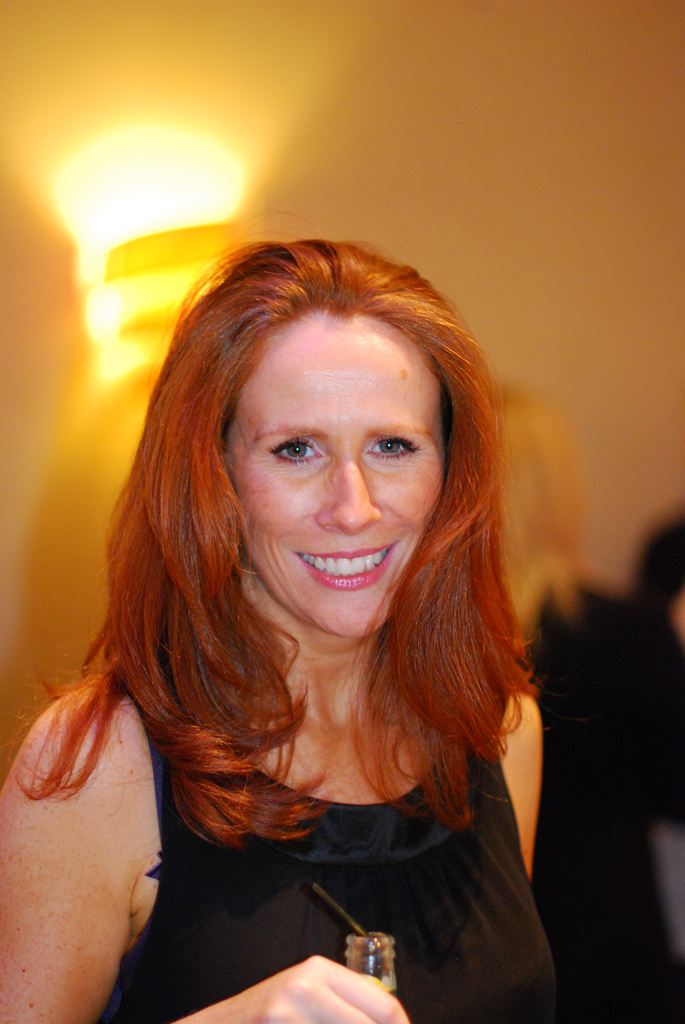
"Tallahassee" marked the return of Nellie Bertram, played by Catherine Tate

"Tallahassee" was written by co-executive producer Daniel Chun, his sixth writing credit for the series after joining the writing staff in the fifth season. It was directed by series cinematographer Matt Sohn, his fourth directing credit for the series. "Tallahassee" marked the return appearance of Catherine Tate as a regular character, having previously appeared in the seventh season finale, "Search Committee" as a candidate to replace Michael as office manager. Tate was initially the top choice to join the cast as the manager, but due to a commitment to the West End production of the Shakespeare play, Much Ado About Nothing she was unable to join the series at the start of the season. Her character, Nellie is re-introduced as the Head of Special Projects for Sabre, and subsequently works in the Scranton office from "Get the Girl". The episode also marked the return appearance of David Koechner, who portrays Todd Packer in the series. He recently made a deal with NBC to do more episodes for the series and also possibly join the cast of series developer Greg Daniels's next series, Friday Night Dinner, an adaption of the British series of the same name.

The episode also marks the ninth appearance of Lindsey Broad, who portrays Cathy, Pam's replacement during her maternity leave. She appeared in a recurring role for the season, after she initially appeared in "Pam's Replacement".

== Cultural references ==
Sabre's Pyramid tablet makes a reappearance, after making its debut in the episode "The Incentive". The device serves as a parody of several tablet computers, specifically the Apple iPad. B. J. Novak described the device as "really the worst piece of technology that you've ever seen." "Florida Stanley" tells Jim to play Kenny Loggins on his iPod in the car, but Jim confuses his request for Loggins and Messina. After Andy buys the office new magazines, Creed is shown zealously reading Dwell. Dwight compares his team to the "enemies of Seabiscuit." At the very end of the episode Wally "Famous" Amos makes an appearance and attempts to talk about success before he is cut off by Nellie, who demands that he serve his famous cookies. The brief exterior shot of the hospital where Dwight had his appendix removed, is the same building that was used in the opening credits of General Hospital, the Los Angeles County - USC Medical Center.

== Reception ==
=== Ratings ===
"Tallahassee" originally aired on NBC in the United States on February 16, 2012. The episode was viewed by an estimated 4.38 million viewers and received a 2.3 rating/6% share among adults between the ages of 18 and 49. This means that it was seen by 2.3% of all 18- to 49-year-olds, and 6% of all 18- to 49-year-olds watching television at the time of the broadcast. This marked a twelve percent drop in the ratings from the previous episode, "Special Project." In addition, the episode was, at the time, the lowest-rated episode of the series to air, beating the first season finale, "Hot Girl", which gathered 4.8 million viewers. The episode finished third in its time slot, being beaten by Grey's Anatomy which received a 3.2 rating/8% share and the CBS drama Person of Interest which received a 2.8 rating/7% share in the 18–49 demographic. The episode beat The CW drama series The Secret Circle. Despite this, "Tallahassee" was the highest-rated NBC television episode of the night. After DVR usage was taken into account, the episode increased its viewership by 61.1%, being viewed by a total of 7.053 million viewers.

=== Reviews ===
"Tallahassee" received largely positive reviews from critics, with many noting that the Florida story-line gave the series a focus. TV Equals noted that the episode was "one of the best episodes of The Office this season and [possibly] one of the better episodes from the last couple of seasons." Brian Marder from Hollywood.com wrote a largely positive review, noting that "Overall, tonight represented a significant step back in the right direction – and hope that maybe the series still has hope... More promisingly, the humor was top-notch, funnily similar to the effortless comedy of early seasons and refreshingly dissimilar to the forced, uncharacteristic stuff that has pervaded season 8." Bret Davinger from the California Literary Review noted that "A couple of weeks ago, I complained about The Office spending too much time away from the office. How was I to know that taking a trip to Tallahassee would produce probably the best episode of the season and maybe one of the best episodes of the past couple of seasons?" Davinger went on to note that the change in scenery from the office set to Tallahassee was working for the series. In addition, he noted that episode did not feature any hints of Erin's desire to stay in Florida or Cathy's attempt to seduce Jim, a move he hoped would be permanent. Jeffrey Hyatt from Screencrave awarded the episode an 8 out of 10 and wrote that "between 'Special Project' and 'Tallahassee' it’s fair to say that The Office is on a nice little run. Everything good and funny about last week's episode spilled over to 'Tallahassee'." TV Fanatic reviewer Dan Forcella awarded the episode four out of five stars. Despite praising the episode for coming "together as one of the best Office episodes of the season," he criticized Dwight's main plot, calling it "not funny." The Filtered Lens reviewer Matt Dougherty called the episode "solid" and noted "While 'Tallahassee' was not quite as good as last week, it still is a step in the right direction for this struggling show." He ultimately awarded the episode a 7 out of 10. Many reviews praised the episode's cold opening, with many critics calling it one of the funniest openings of the eighth season. What Culture! reviewer Jeffrey Kratzer, despite awarding the episode three out of five stars, wrote, "'Tallahassee' was so enjoyable (for the most part) that [the] next few episodes look to be the excitement and focused momentum we've been waiting for all season." Conversely, The A.V. Club reviewer Myles McNutt gave the episode a C− rating and criticized the episode's lack of complexity. He wrote that, "I would argue, though, that [undeveloped characters are] part of the show’s problem right now" and noted that Tate's performance was expanded "little ... beyond her initial appearance last season." In a review for the subsequent episode, "After Hours", however, McNutt acknowledged that, "If I'm being honest with [sic], last week's probably should have been above a 'C-,' but I went with my gut and have to stand by that decision."
