= Doomsday (The Office) =

- The Office episode
- Episode no.: Season 8 Episode 6
- Directed by: Troy Miller
- Written by: Daniel Chun
- Cinematography by: Matt Sohn
- Editing by: Claire Scanlon
- Production code: 803
- Original air date: November 3, 2011

Guest appearances
- Mark Proksch as Nate Nickerson

Episode chronology
← Previous "Spooked"	Next → "Pam's Replacement"
- The Office (American season 8)

"Doomsday" is the sixth episode of the eighth season of the American comedy television series The Office, and the show's 158th episode overall. The episode aired on NBC in the United States on November 3, 2011. "Doomsday" was written by Daniel Chun and directed by Troy Miller.

The series—presented as if it were a real documentary—depicts the everyday lives of office employees in the Scranton, Pennsylvania branch of the fictional Dunder Mifflin Paper Company. In the episode, Dwight Schrute (Rainn Wilson) programs a device that will fire all of the employees and effectively close down the branch if they make too many mistakes. Meanwhile, Gabe Lewis (Zach Woods) attempts to court the new warehouse worker, Val.

"Doomsday" received mixed to positive reviews from critics, with some reviews critiquing the episode's resolution. According to Nielsen Media Research, the episode was viewed by 6.15 million viewers and received a 3.2 rating/8% share among adult between the ages of 18 and 49, marking an increase in the ratings from the previous episode. The episode ranked third in its time slot and was the highest-rated NBC show of the night.

== Synopsis ==
Robert California confronts Andy Bernard about the number of mishaps and blunders made in the office, and gives him a firm directive to "simply end the mistakes." With no ideas on how to make this come about, Andy puts it in the hands of Dwight Schrute, who devises a system to find mistakes made by employees in the office. He programs an "accountability booster" that will forward incriminating emails to California if they make five mistakes in one day, effectively causing them to lose their jobs. The rest of the office are unhappy with Dwight's system, and call it a doomsday device. Despite their best efforts, the group manages to make five mistakes barely halfway through the first day with the system, and Dwight reveals that the emails will be automatically sent to California at 5:00 pm. Andy, along with the other office workers, pleads with Dwight to deactivate the system, but Dwight refuses, belittles the rest of the office staff for being so careless, and retreats to Schrute Farms.

The office formulates two plans to save their jobs. Jim Halpert is tasked with tracking down Robert at a squash court and intercepting the emails before California has a chance to view them, while Andy, Pam Halpert, Erin Hannon, and Kevin Malone head to Schrute Farms, ostensibly to try to change Dwight's mind. However, Pam consistently silences any attempt to bring up the device, saying she knows Dwight and is confident that he will stop the device on his own. They give him a baseball hat as a present, which he promptly buries in a hole he is digging. After complimenting Dwight numerous times, helping him dig the hole, and having a small meal, Pam makes a joke that emphasizes that everyone makes mistakes. Dwight is humored by the joke.

To justify his presence at the squash court, Jim claims to be a regular player and begins a match with Robert, demonstrating his complete lack of skill at squash and resulting in multiple injuries. He makes an unsuccessful attempt to access Robert's email from his phone, and finally resorts to trying to "accidentally" break his phone. However, when Robert checks his messages after 5:00, the e-mail has not come through. Realizing that Dwight must have stopped the device, Jim admits that he was obviously lying about being a squash player and prepares to leave, but Robert, apparently oblivious to Jim's statements, makes him stay and continue playing. Dwight insists that he doesn't like his co-workers, but is seen digging the hat back up.

Gabe Lewis unsuccessfully tries to strike up a relationship with a new warehouse worker, Val. After only making a passing comment, he attempts to file a relationship disclosure form, despite the fact that they aren't even dating. Darryl Philbin, observing Gabe's pitiful attempts, tries to imply that Val does not feel the same way, but to no avail. Gabe derides Darryl during Darryl's warehouse safety seminar, so Darryl intentionally screws up Gabe's coffee order. When Gabe does ask Val out, she politely declines and says she does not date co-workers. Darryl hears this and decides he will not pursue Val either.

== Production ==
The episode was written by co-executive producer Daniel Chun. It was directed by Troy Miller, his second directing credit after the previous season's "Dwight K. Schrute, (Acting) Manager". The Season Eight DVD contains a number of deleted scenes from this episode. Notable cut scenes include Jim explaining to the camera that he has never played squash, and then proceeds to convince Robert California to play another game, Gabe explaining his philosophy by saying that "he would throw any brother under the bus for any whore... woman", Stanley comparing Dwight's doomsday device to the Y2K bug, Jim and Pam arguing about whether or not Jim was there on the day Dwight fixed her computer, and Andy offering Robert California a pipe during a meeting that Dwight asks to be a part of.

== Reception ==
=== Ratings ===
In its original American broadcast, "Doomsday" was viewed by an estimated 6.15 million viewers and received a 3.2 rating/8% share among adults between the ages of 18 and 49. This means that it was seen by 3.2% of all 18- to 49-year-olds, and 8% of all 18- to 49-year-olds watching television at the time of the broadcast. This marked an increase in the ratings from the previous episode, "Spooked". The episode ranked third in its timeslot beating Person of Interest which received a 2.7 rating/7% share in the 18–49 demographic and The Secret Circle which received a 0.9 rating/2% share, but was defeated by Grey's Anatomy which received a 3.6 rating/9% share and the season premiere of Bones which received a 3.3 rating/8% share. A repeat of the episode on January 5, 2012 drew 2.61 million and received a 1.1 rating/3% share among adults between the ages of 18 and 49, ranking fourth in its time slot, despite the episode being a rerun.

=== Reviews ===
The episode received mixed reviews. Several reviews wrote positively of the ensemble and character acting. Hannah Lawrence from Hollywood was happy with romance of the episode, writing "It seems clear that the writers are spending more time on characters finding love, and I actually enjoy it very much ... I suspect the writers are aware that ultimately what all of us want for the Dunder-Mifflin employees is love." CliqueClack wrote positively of the episode, praising the ensemble acting, and wrote, "Overall, another solid ensemble episode. Way to go, The Office!" Many other reviews compared the episode, either positively or negatively, to previous episodes. Jeffrey Hyatt from Screencrave gave the episode an 8/10 rating and wrote, "I'd say it was the strongest of the six episodes so far this season ... 'Doomsday' delivered that classic, Office formula where everything just works – and it feels so right." Joseph Kratzer from WhatCulture awarded the episode 3-and-a-half stars out of five and compared it to the season's previous episodes, writing, "For a minute there I thought season eight of The Office was going to be some kind of subpar shut-out, but thankfully 'Doomsday' has lifted the series out of the rut it's been in ... I feel 'Doomsday' was successful because it captured a sense of ease and fluidity the show's been lacking severely since Michael's departure."

Other reviews were more mixed, or simply referred to the episode as "decent". Jill Mader from InsidePulse called the episode "decent" noting that "[that is how the] season has been shaping up." Dan Forcella from TVFanatic noted that the episode was not a "fantastic episode of The Office, but it had its funny moments, and that's what I tune in for." The A.V. Club reviewer Myles McNutt wrote "Doomsday" was not "a terrible episode by any means [but] the various pieces never fell into place, and the resolution didn't feel as though it was earned by the episode that came before it. It just felt like it was trying to do too much too quickly, never quite narrowing in on character in the midst of manufacturing chaos." McNutt ultimately gave the episode a B−. Despite some of the more mixed reviews, a large majority of critics found the cold-opening humorous, with many noting that it was the best of the season so far.
