= After Hours (The Office) =

- The Office episode
- Episode no.: Season 8 Episode 16
- Directed by: Brian Baumgartner
- Written by: Halsted Sullivan; Warren Lieberstein
- Cinematography by: Matt Sohn
- Editing by: David Rogers
- Production code: 816
- Original air date: February 23, 2012

Guest appearances
- David Koechner as Todd Packer; Lindsey Broad as Cathy Simms; Jerry C. Minor as Brandon; Ameenah Kaplan as Val Johnson

Episode chronology
← Previous "Tallahassee"	Next → "Test the Store"
- The Office (American season 8)

"After Hours" is the sixteenth episode of the eighth season of the American comedy television series The Office and the show's 168th episode overall. The episode aired on NBC in the United States on February 23, 2012. "After Hours" was written by co-executive producers Halsted Sullivan and Warren Lieberstein and directed by Brian Baumgartner, who portrays Kevin Malone on the series, marking his directorial debut.

The series—presented as if it were a real documentary—depicts the everyday lives of office employees in the Scranton, Pennsylvania, branch of the fictional Dunder Mifflin Paper Company. In the episode, Dwight Schrute (Rainn Wilson) and Todd Packer (David Koechner) compete for a job. Meanwhile, Jim Halpert (John Krasinski) has to deal with Cathy Simms' (Lindsey Broad) sexual advances in his hotel room. Also, Andy Bernard (Ed Helms) has everyone stay late to cover for their co-workers in Florida.

"After Hours" received mixed reviews from critics. According to the Nielsen Media Research, "After Hours" was viewed by an estimated 5.02 million viewers and received a 2.6 rating/7% share among adults between the ages of 18 and 49, marking a 16% rise in the ratings from the series low ratings of the previous episode, "Tallahassee". The episode also ranked as the highest-rated NBC program of the night.

== Synopsis ==
Dwight Schrute and Todd Packer compete to become VP under Nellie Bertram by seducing her after work at the hotel bar. For most of the night, Packer seems to be the most successful, so Dwight has Gabe Lewis keep Nellie distracted while Dwight helps Jim Halpert with something in his hotel room. Gabe takes it upon himself to spike Packer's beer with his asthma inhaler, which causes Packer to vomit on Gabe's pants and leaves Dwight alone with Nellie. Dwight eventually succeeds in seducing Nellie as she asks for a key to his room. Upon kissing her and realizing that what he is doing is wrong, Dwight secretly scratches off the magnetic strip on his hotel card before giving it to Nellie, stating the seduction was only to gain approval.

In Scranton, Andy Bernard has everyone stay late to cover for their co-workers in Florida, which turns into an awkward situation when Val's boyfriend, Brandon, arrives with Jamaican food Andy ordered and accuses Darryl Philbin of having an affair with her, after having read Darryl's text messages to her. Kelly Kapoor demands that Darryl read them aloud out of voyeuristic interest. Upon hearing them, most of the staff agree that his text messages, particularly an extended ellipsis at the end of one, are suggestive of Darryl wanting to be with Val. Val protests that the idea of her being romantically involved with Darryl is ridiculous. Pam Halpert and Andy each advise Darryl on what Jim would do; while Andy suggest he wait, Pam says that if Jim had not made romantic advances while she was still engaged, she never would have ended up marrying him. Darryl follows Pam's advice and tells Val that a potential relationship is not ridiculous.

Erin Hannon confides in Ryan Howard that she is intending to stay in Tallahassee. Ryan interprets this as an invitation to hook up with her, so he attempts to seduce her by taking her to the empty kitchen to help her make a waffle she unsuccessfully ordered. They hide under a table when the chefs return. After Ryan compliments Erin, she suggests that they could become roommates in Florida and possibly start dating in six months if things go well between them. Not wanting that long timeline, he begrudgingly resorts to saying he loves Kelly.

Jim has started spending more time with Cathy Simms because Stanley Hudson keeps trying to rope Jim into having an affair. During the night at the hotel, Cathy asks to hang out for a while in Jim's room under the pretext that the heat in her room is malfunctioning. She repeatedly makes seductive signals, making Jim uncomfortable. Stanley is no help, so he calls Dwight saying he has bed bugs. Fearing that the bugs will transfer onto Dwight himself, Dwight arrives and forces Cathy off Jim's bed so he can lure out the bed bugs with his nearly naked body. This fails to sufficiently disgust Cathy, who merely steps into the bathroom to take a shower until Dwight leaves. Cathy gets out of the shower wearing only a bath robe. After ordering some desserts from room service and asking Jim to touch her legs, he finally comes out saying that he is happily married, and does not want to be with her. Cathy gets defensive and insists that she did not have any romantic intentions whatsoever, so Jim relents, but Cathy immediately resumes her seductive technique. After Jim goes to the bathroom, he comes out to find her in only her underwear under his blanket. Fed up, he demands that she leave and lets Dwight, armed with spray chemicals, into the room. Jim claims to see a bed bug near Cathy, making her flee from Dwight's spraying. However, because of the chemicals, Dwight suggests Jim sleep in Cathy's room. Jim instead spends the night with Dwight in his room, eating Cathy's desserts and watching TV, while a drunken Nellie tries unsuccessfully to get in.

== Production ==
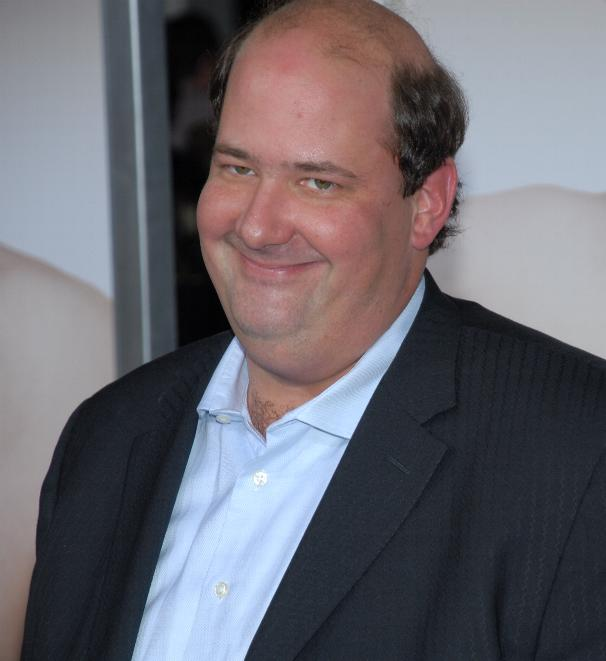
"After Hours" marks the directorial debut of Brian Baumgartner, who portrays series regular Kevin Malone.

"After Hours" was written by co-executive producers Halsted Sullivan and Warren Lieberstein. It was directed by Brian Baumgartner, who portrays Kevin Malone on the series, marking his directorial debut. The script originally had Jim cheating on Pam with a woman in Florida, but Krasinski refused this script, telling the creators that fans would never watch the show again if that happened. The episode features a guest appearance from David Koechner, who appears as Todd Packer in the series. He recently made a deal with NBC to do more episodes for the series and also possibly join the cast of series developer Greg Daniels's next series, Friday Night Dinner, an adaption of the British series of the same name. The episode marks the tenth appearance of Lindsey Broad who plays Cathy, Pam's replacement during her maternity leave. She appeared in a recurring role for the season, after she initially appeared in "Pam's Replacement". The Season Eight DVD contains a number of deleted scenes from this episode. Notable cut scenes include Nellie establishing boundaries for flirtation, Nellie and Dwight confessing peculiar secrets to each other, and Pam and Andy calling Jim for advice, only to have Cathy answer the phone.

== Reception ==
=== Ratings ===
"After Hours" originally aired on NBC in the United States on February 23, 2012. The episode was viewed by an estimated 5.02 million viewers and received a 2.6 rating/7% share among adults between the ages of 18 and 49. This means that it was seen by 2.6% of all 18- to 49-year-olds, and 7% of all 18- to 49-year-olds watching television at the time of the broadcast. This marked a 13-percent rise in the ratings from the previous episode, "Tallahassee". The episode finished third in its time slot, being beaten by Grey's Anatomy which received a 3.1 rating/8% share and the CBS drama Person of Interest which received a 3.1 rating/7% share in the 18–49 demographic. The episode beat The CW drama series The Secret Circle and the Fox drama series The Finder. Despite this, "After Hours" was the highest-rated NBC television episode of the night. It was also the last episode of The Office to be viewed by more than 5 million viewers until the series finale a year later.

=== Reviews ===
"After Hours" received mixed reviews from critics. HitFix writer Alan Sepinwall called it the best episode of a "disappointing" season. He was mainly positive towards the focus of the episode with both story-lines in Tallahassee and Scranton taken place after hours and for the several plot lines in the episode. He praised the pairing of Darryl and Val, saying that they are better matched to be the series' "new" Jim and Pam than Andy and Erin. Cindy White of IGN said that the episode proved the series was "on a hot streak". She mainly liked the storylines taking place in Tallahassee and said that the end of the Dwight-Nellie storyline was a "nice bit of character development". She was also very positive to Baumgarter's directing in the episode, saying he "nailed" the documentary format of the episode. She went on to slightly criticize the Scranton storyline and wrote that she hoped the writers would wait before putting Val and Darryl together. She ultimately gave the episode a 7.5/10.

Not all reviews were positive. The A.V. Club reviewer Myles McNutt wrote that the episode was too crowded and that while all four plotlines had "potential", they weren't given enough time to develop. Despite this, he did compliment the Dwight scenes, due to their ability to gain a "comic rhythm". He also complimented the Dwight-Nellie-Todd storyline, saying that his decision to not sleep with Nellie was a "nicely human moment" and also wrote that the character was more grounded when he was more self-aware. He ultimately gave the episode a C+.

Many critics commented on the plot featuring Cathy attempting to seduce Jim. White noted that, "Jim did bumble it a bit in the face of Cathy taking insincere offense at his accusation, but the outcome wasn't hard to predict. Of course Jim would stay true to his real soulmate." Sepinwall noted Dwight's cartoonish behavior in the episode, although he called it a good addition to the Jim-Cathy story-line. McNutt wrote that due to the "choppy storytelling", the Jim-Cathy storyline was not able to feel awkward enough to "feel Jim's struggle".
