= Special Project =

- The Office episode
- Episode no.: Season 8 Episode 14
- Directed by: David Rogers
- Written by: Amelie Gillette
- Cinematography by: Matt Sohn
- Editing by: David Rogers
- Production code: 814
- Original air date: February 9, 2012

Guest appearances
- Lindsey Broad as Cathy Simms; Ameenah Kaplan as Val Johnson; Mark Proksch as Nate Nickerson; Eleanor Seigler as Jessica

Episode chronology
← Previous "Jury Duty"	Next → "Tallahassee"
- The Office (American season 8)

"Special Project" is the fourteenth episode of the eighth season of the American comedy television series The Office and the show's 166th episode overall. The episode aired on NBC in the United States on February 9, 2012. It was written by Amelie Gillette and was directed by David Rogers.

The series—presented as if it were a real documentary—depicts the everyday lives of office employees in the Scranton, Pennsylvania, branch of the fictional Dunder Mifflin Paper Company. In the episode, Pam Halpert (Jenna Fischer) returns from her maternity leave, and Dwight Schrute (Rainn Wilson) and Andy Bernard (Ed Helms) must select employees to accompany Dwight to Tallahassee, Florida after he is sent on an assignment. Meanwhile, Darryl Philbin (Craig Robinson) receives a beanie from warehouse worker Val (Ameenah Kaplan) and is unsure if she intended it as a romantic gift or simply one of friendship.

"Special Project" introduced a six-episode arc which featured several of the office workers working on a special project for Sabre in Tallahassee. The episode received largely positive reviews from critics, with many reviewers looking forward to the "special projects" storyline. The ending scene featuring Cathy's phone conversation about Jim and Pam's marriage has also received significant attention from critics. According to Nielsen Media Research, "Special Project" drew 5.16 million viewers and received a 2.5 rating/6% share in the 18–49 demographic, marking a three-tenths drop in ratings from the previous episode, "Jury Duty", and becoming one of the lowest-rated episodes of the series. Despite this, it was the highest-rated NBC series of the night.

== Synopsis ==
Just as Pam Halpert's maternity leave ends and Angela Lipton also returns, Dwight Schrute is assigned with the task of forming a team and traveling down to Florida for three weeks to help Sabre launch a chain of retail stores. He and Andy Bernard must select employees to accompany Dwight to Tallahassee. At first Dwight chooses Darryl Philbin, Phyllis Vance, Toby Flenderson, Angela, and Oscar Martinez, for varying reasons, but Andy refuses to let so many essential employees leave for three weeks. While letting Dwight have Darryl and Phyllis, Andy chooses Kelly Kapoor, Kevin Malone and Cathy Simms to join the team instead, upsetting Dwight. Dwight then prematurely announces the picks and deliberately riles up the employees, hoping to change the team. Andy decides to let people convince him why they should go before making his final decision, further stressing Dwight.

Meanwhile, Jim Halpert receives a confusing text from Robert California, which might be an invitation/request for him to join the team in Tallahassee. When Robert makes it clear he wants Jim there, Jim is not eager to go, but agrees for two reasons: Pam encourages him to go because it will be a good career move, and Dwight's rude statement that he can't carry Jim's (nonexistent) incompetence on the team leads Jim to bluntly tell Dwight that he's going because Robert selected him to participate. The final team includes Cathy, Ryan Howard, Stanley Hudson, Erin Hannon and Jim, infuriating Dwight. At first he tries to convince the members to change their minds using various Florida stereotypes, at one point filling the conference room with 300 mosquitoes, but after realizing they all have excellent ideas for the project, he is content with the team.

Erin expresses frustration that Andy is still with Jessica. After Andy and Dwight jointly choose her for the project team, she admits in a talking head that she is not going to return to Scranton once she arrives in Florida. At the end of the episode, it is revealed that Cathy also has ulterior motives for the trip, intending to seduce Jim while the two are in Florida together, stating, during a cell phone conversation to a friend, that "[Jim's] marriage is not good; nobody knows better than me. Definitely we will. It's three weeks in Tallahassee. What else is there to do?"

Darryl discovers warehouse worker Val has knitted him a beanie. Unsure if she intended it as a romantic gift or simply one of friendship, Darryl decides to find out by giving her a Valentine's Day gift of an expensive pair of cashmere ladies' gloves with a romantic card. Upon discovering that Val had knitted a beanie for everyone in the warehouse, an embarrassed Darryl passes the gloves off to warehouse worker Nate, who is moved by the gift, and later gives him personal coupons for repayment. Darryl is further disappointed when a man named Brandon calls asking for the address of the warehouse to send flowers to his girlfriend Val. He is intrigued, however, when she says the flowers were from her mother, despite him pointing out the caller had had a deep voice and gone by the name Brandon. Darryl decides Val's gift was "a love beanie".

== Production ==
The episode was written by story editor Amelie Gillette, her second writing credit for the series after joining the writing staff in the seventh season. It was directed by series producer and editor David Rogers, his fifth directing credit for the series. The episode also marks the eighth appearance of Lindsey Broad, who plays Cathy, Pam's replacement during her maternity leave. She makes an appearance in the episode, despite the fact that Pam arrives back to work, which is referenced in the episode by Meredith Palmer. The episode introduced a six-episode arc which featured several of the office workers working on a special project for Sabre in Tallahassee, Florida. The Season Eight DVD contains a number of deleted scenes from this episode. Notable cut scenes include more clips of Dwight forming his group, Cathy mentioning a former boyfriend to the camera, and more clips of the office workers attempting to join the special projects group.

== Cultural references ==
Stanley says that he's the only one in the office who watches the television series, Burn Notice. Dwight says after finishing work on the special project in Florida, they will be able to go visit Cape Canaveral and go sea kayaking with Gloria Estefan. While attempting to convince his group not to go to Florida, pictures of Casey Anthony, Katherine Harris, Brooke Hogan and Tony Montana are used.

== Reception ==
=== Ratings ===
The episode first aired on NBC in the United States on February 9, 2012. The episode was viewed by an estimated 5.16 million viewers and received a 2.5 rating/6% share among adults between the ages of 18 and 49. This means that it was seen by 2.5% of all 18- to 49-year-olds, and 6% of all 18- to 49-year-olds watching television at the time of the broadcast. This marked a three-tenths drop in the ratings from the previous episode, "Jury Duty". The episode finished third in its time slot, being beaten by Grey's Anatomy which received a 3.9 rating/10% share and the CBS drama Person of Interest which received a 3.3 rating/8% share in the 18–49 demographic. The episode beat the Fox drama series The Finder and The CW drama series The Secret Circle. Despite this, "Special Project" was the highest-rated NBC television episode of the night. After DVR usage was taken into account, the episode increased its viewership by 64%, being viewed by a total of 7.842 million viewers.

=== Critical response ===
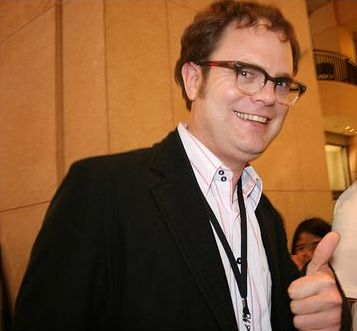
Rainn Wilson's performance received mixed reviews from critics with The A.V. Club reviewer Myles McNutt criticizing it for being too "broad".

"Special Project" received mainly positive reviews from critics, with many looking forward to the "special projects" plotline. The A.V. Club reviewer Myles McNutt praised the episode and the introduction of the special projects plotline, comparing it to the third season arc featuring Jim in Stamford, Connecticut, and the "Michael Scott Paper Company" arc from the fifth season. He praised the episode for feeling "like a big answer to many of the issues that have plagued the show so far this season", specifically pointing to Dwight's meta-commentary on Cathy's "lack of personality". He moreover wrote that he was looking forward to the rest of the season and the change in dynamic. Despite this, he criticized Dwight's role in the episode, comparing his orientation to Michael's conference room lectures and wrote he had a "distaste" for the broader moments for the character. He ultimately gave the episode an A−, his highest grade for an eighth-season episode.

New York writer Michael Tedder gave the episode a positive review for avoiding the "cutesy" moments that were featured in the first half of the season. He praised several of the cast members' performances in the episode, including Ellie Kemper and Mark Proksch. He also complimented the sub-plot featuring Darryl and Val, but wrote that the producers should just get the two together, because "Not every ongoing plotline needs to last all season". IGN writer Cindy White wrote a positive review for the episode for allowing the "less prominent characters of the ensemble" to get some lines in the episode, specifically mentioning Stanley and Ryan. She also complimented the Darryl-Val subplot, writing that they're one of the few romantic pairings on the show that she's "rooting" for. She ultimately gave the episode an 8.0/10, calling it "impressive".

However, not all reviews were positive. Lizzie Fhur of Buzz Sugar wrote that while the "special projects" storyline has potential, "this week just kind of landed flat for me". Brian Marder of Hollywood called the episode a "giant step back", especially following the previous episode which he called "promising". He wrote that the jokes and story of the episode went "nowhere" and he criticized the episode for its loud, "laugh-track-worthy" jokes compared to the early seasons of the series that featured more subtle humor. Despite the mostly negative review, he wrote that he hoped the episode would lead to a better storyline in the following episodes. The ending scene featuring Cathy's phone conversation about Jim and Pam's marriage has also received significant attention. Cindy White criticized the suggestion that Cathy will break Jim and Pam, calling it a "cheap plow" and that if Cathy and Jim would have an affair, it would cause "serious damage to [Jim's] character", while Myles McNutt felt it would allow Cathy to become an actual character in the series.
