= Spooked (The Office) =

- The Office episode
- Dwight dressed as Sarah Kerrigan
- Episode no.: Season 8 Episode 5
- Directed by: Randall Einhorn
- Written by: Carrie Kemper
- Cinematography by: Sarah Levy
- Editing by: Rick Weis
- Production code: 806
- Original air date: October 27, 2011

Guest appearance
- David Mazouz as Bert California

Episode chronology
| ← Previous "Garden Party" | Next → "Doomsday" |
- The Office (American season 8)

"Spooked" is the fifth episode of the eighth season of the American comedy television series The Office, and the show's 157th episode overall. The episode originally aired on NBC in the United States on October 27, 2011. It was written by Carrie Kemper, sister of cast member Ellie Kemper, and directed by Randall Einhorn. The episode guest starred David Mazouz.

The series—presented as if it were a real documentary—depicts the everyday lives of office employees in the Scranton, Pennsylvania, branch of the fictional Dunder Mifflin Paper Company. In the episode, Erin Hannon (Kemper) works to make a spooky, non-childish Halloween party with help from Gabe Lewis (Zach Woods). Dwight Schrute (Rainn Wilson) becomes friends with Robert California's (James Spader) son (David Mazouz), and Pam (Jenna Fischer) and Jim Halpert (John Krasinski) debate the existence of ghosts. Meanwhile, Robert figures out everyone's deepest fears and tries to culminate a ghost story.

"Spooked" received mixed reviews, although many critics complimented Ellie Kemper's performance. According to the Nielsen Media Research, "Spooked" drew 5.53 million viewers and received a 2.9 rating/7% share in the 18–49 demographic. The episode ranked as one of the lowest-rated episodes of the series to air on Thursday and ranked third in its timeslot.

== Synopsis ==
Erin Hannon has been assigned to set up the Halloween party by Andy Bernard, who wants to live up to the expectations set by Robert California. Robert arrives with his son Bert and remarks that the party is more tailored to kids than adults. In response, Andy asks Angela Martin and Phyllis Vance to take over and re-tailor the party, much to Erin's chagrin as she still holds feelings for him. Andy also tells her that he wishes to speak with her at the end of the day. Worried that he intends to fire her, she asks Gabe Lewis to help her make the party more "scary" and "sexy", and he gives her a tape to show everyone. Gabe explains to the camera crew that the video is a Cinema of the Unsettling movie, an avant garde film genre defined by its disturbing images and absence of plot. Disgusted by the video (as well as visibly baffled by two of the images displaying Oscar Martinez's grandma and Stanley Hudson simply getting in his car), the office staff demand an explanation from Erin. In desperation, she shows them her idea for making the party more "sexy": a card game with photos of genitalia. This only makes them more outraged, and Andy and Robert talk with Erin in Andy’s office regarding the incident. Erin admits her fears about their planned talk at the end of the day. Andy tells her what he wanted to talk to her about: he has reached a point in his romantic relationship where his girlfriend should be able to call him at the office, and that he wanted to clear this with Erin first since she handles all calls. Erin had not even known that he was dating someone, and is shocked to hear they have been out on 31 dates so far. Erin feels dejected and leaves.

Jim and Pam Halpert argue whether ghosts are real after she claims to have seen one at a pub where she used to work. Meanwhile, Dwight Schrute dresses up as Sarah Kerrigan from StarCraft, but Toby Flenderson takes off his wings as they had knives on them and Dwight is not allowed to bring in weapons. Bert recognizes what his costume is supposed to be, and despite Dwight's annoyance at Bert's criticisms about dressing as a girl and that no one seems to like him, Bert gains his respect when he tells Dwight the scariest animal is a box jellyfish, and the two bond over playing StarCraft all day, ignoring everyone else. Dwight also makes Bert pretend to fire Toby, for taking away his weapons, on the grounds that he is the CEO's son.

Throughout the party, Robert coaxes each of the employees into revealing their deepest fears. Before leaving, he tells a horror story implementing all their fears as a way to convince them not to let fear control their lives. This inspires Jim and Pam to stop their argument and Erin to talk to Andy about her feelings.

== Production ==
The episode was written by story editor Carrie Kemper, sister of cast member Ellie Kemper, her second written story for the series. It was directed by one of The Office's cinematographers, Randall Einhorn, his 15th directing credit for the series. The episode is the third Halloween themed episode of the series after season 2's "Halloween" and season seven's "Costume Contest". The episode also featured James Spader as Sabre CEO Robert California, who was set to appear in 15 episodes for the season. The Season Eight DVD contains a number of deleted scenes from this episode. Notable cut scenes include the rest of the office getting in the debate over whether ghosts exist, and Robert's son Bert and Dwight talking about zombies, specifically characters from The Walking Dead.

== Cultural references ==
In the episode, Dwight dresses up as Sarah Kerrigan, a character from the video game series StarCraft. Later, Toby narrates a montage of previous costumes worn by Dwight, including Freddy Krueger, Jigsaw, and Pinhead, the primary antagonists from the A Nightmare on Elm Street, Saw, and Hellraiser franchises, respectively. Angela is seen dressed in the same cat that she wore in the season two episode, "Halloween". Jim, Kevin and Darryl are dressed up as professional basketball players Chris Bosh, Dwyane Wade and LeBron James, respectively. Ryan is dressed as Jesse Pinkman from the TV series Breaking Bad, wearing the character's signature yellow hoodie and beanie.

== Reception ==
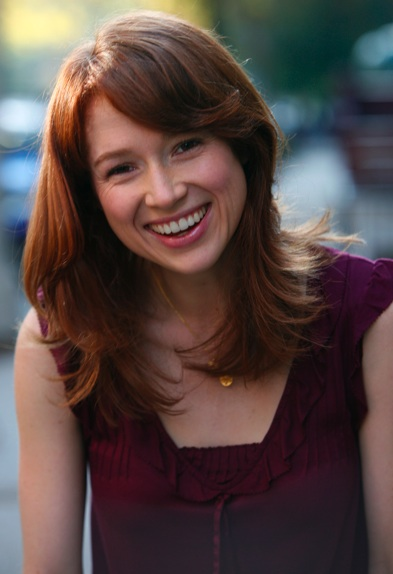
Ellie Kemper's performance as Erin was widely praised by critics.

=== Ratings ===
In its original American broadcast, "Spooked" was viewed by an estimated 5.53 million viewers and received a 2.9 rating/7% share among adults between the ages of 18 and 49. This means that it was seen by 2.9% of all 18- to 49-year-olds in the United States, and 7% of all 18- to 49-year-olds watching television at the time of the broadcast. This marked a 15% drop in the ratings from the previous episode, "Garden Party" making it the lowest-rated episode of the series that aired on Thursday. The episode ranked third in its timeslot beating Person of Interest, which received a 2.7 rating/7% share in the 18—49 demographic, and The Secret Circle, which received a 0.9 rating/2% share. The episode, however, was beaten to number two by Grey's Anatomy, which received a 3.7 rating/9% share, and beaten to number one by the 2011 World Series, which received a 6.5 rating/18% share.

=== Reviews ===
The episode received mostly mixed reviews from critics. National Post writer Barry Hertz wrote that while "it wasn’t as patience-testing as last year’s outing ['Costume Contest'], but it also wasn’t as gut-busting and on-the-nose as its earlier incarnation ['Halloween']." He complimented the Erin and Andy plot, but called the Jim and Pam plot "boring". Ellie Kemper's performance received commendations from Hertz. The A.V. Club reviewer Myles McNutt criticized the episode for "just creating situations and seeing how the characters react to them, which is likely why the writers were willing to lazily rehash the stock 'office Halloween party' setup that drives the narrative of 'Spooked'." Despite this, he wrote positively of Erin's plot, Kemper's performance, and James Spader's scary speech at the end. However, McNutt was critical of the Dwight plot and the Jim and Pam plot writing that "I don’t care that Pam believes in ghosts and Jim doesn’t, I don’t care that Dwight gets a few scenes in which the cynical adult is softened by the presence of a precocious child." He ultimately gave the episode a C+. New York writer Chris Blanche criticized the episode for its lack of heart. Television Without Pity gave the episode a C rating. Several critics considered the episode an improvement over the previous Halloween episode, "Costume Contest".
