= Nellie Bertram =

- The Office character
- First appearance: "Search Committee" (2011)
- Last appearance: "Finale" (2013)
- Created by: Greg Daniels; Paul Lieberstein
- Portrayed by: Catherine Tate

In-universe information
- Occupation: President of Sabre's Special Projects, Tallahassee, Florida; Regional Manager of Dunder Mifflin, Scranton, Pennsylvania; Special Projects Manager of Dunder Mifflin, Scranton, Pennsylvania; Sales Representative, Dunder Mifflin, Scranton, Pennsylvania; Formula One Driver
- Children: Drake Howard (adopted son)
- Nationality: British

Nellie Bertram is a fictional character on the American comedy television series The Office, portrayed by Catherine Tate. She first appears as a guest star in the seventh season, where she interviewed for the Regional Manager position at the Dunder Mifflin Scranton branch. She is an original character, and has no counterpart in the original British version of the series.

Initially a one-episode guest star, she was reportedly the top choice to replace Steve Carell, but was unable to join the series, due to her commitment to the West End production of the Shakespeare play Much Ado About Nothing. However, Tate later returned to the role as a series regular for the second half of season eight and continued in the role for the final season.

== Biography ==
Nellie Bertram is portrayed as a crass and outspoken woman of English nationality. She has a strong dislike for Irish people. She was born in the "working-class town" of Basildon, and, until the age of 32, spoke in a "horrendous" Essex accent.

She is an old friend of Jo Bennett's, and believes that it is possible that she is Jo's best friend, while stating that Jo, however, is not her best friend. It is highly probable that their friendship is the only reason why Jo recommended her for the Regional Manager job, as Nellie is shown to make considerably poor decisions in her professional life, such as rejecting Cathy Simms' idea of the Sabre retail stores having a beach, winter, and jungle theme, simply because she did not like the winter theme concept, and refusing to change that one theme in order for Cathy's idea to appeal to her. However, she is shown to be aware of her legion of shortcomings, telling the camera crew, in the episode "Get the Girl", "I grew up poor. I have had little formal education, and no real skills. I don't work especially hard. Most of my ideas are either unoriginal, or total crap".

Her stated philosophy in business is "if the seat is open, the job is open", a motto which had led her to briefly race a Formula One car (for what were the three slowest laps ever recorded).

Long before her move to Scranton, Nellie was in a long-term relationship with a stage magician named Henry, only to have him suddenly leave her for a waitress and vanish from her life, resulting in a loathing for anyone of that profession.

Nellie first appeared in the seventh-season finale, where she interviewed for the Regional Manager position of the Dunder Mifflin Scranton branch, the position that Michael Scott held for the majority of the series. She returns in the episode "Tallahassee", as Sabre's president of special projects. She reveals that she reacted to being rejected for the Manager job by going on a destructive shopping spree (she mentions that she purchased 13 pianos). But, she soon came up with the concept of the Sabre company opening up a chain of retail stores, an idea that Jo was ecstatic about and hired Bertram to start the project.

Nellie had long-harbored a desire to adopt a child, and after being initially rejected by an adoption agency during season eight, finally gets her wish in the series finale.

== Seasons 7–8 ==
Nellie made her debut in "Search Committee", interviewing for the Regional Manager position at the Dunder Mifflin Scranton branch, but proves herself to be woefully inept for the job. However, in a talking-head interview, she expresses confidence that she will be chosen for it, due to her friendship and recommendation from Jo.

Bertram reappears in the eighth season episode, "Tallahassee" as the President of Sabre's special projects. In the episode, Dwight Schrute, Jim Halpert, Erin Hannon, Stanley Hudson, Ryan Howard, and Cathy, as well many employees at Sabre headquarters, attend her orientation meeting, where she explains how she obtained her occupation as President of special projects, recalling how she interviewed for the Regional Manager position at the Dunder Mifflin Scranton branch, but was not hired, because the search committee decided, as she pointedly reminds Jim, that she and the job were not "A good fit". However, she later thought of the concept of the Sabre company opening up a chain of retail stores, and called Jo to inform her of the idea. Jo was ecstatic about it, and hired Nellie to oversee it. Throughout the episode, Dwight and Todd Packer compete to see who will become Nellie's vice president. While she is initially impressed with Packer, and the two are even seen flirting with one another, she is soon impressed with Dwight, as well, who, despite being rushed into surgery, after developing an appendicitis, returns three hours after his appendix is removed in order to impress her. After nearly butchering a slide-show presentation, he finally impresses Nellie by telling the audience that the only element of marketing that matters is "Desire". Bertram subsequently invites Packer and Dwight to have breakfast with her the following day.

In "After Hours", Dwight and Packer compete to seduce Nellie after work at the hotel bar, in order to become VP under her. For most of the night, Packer seems to be the more successful; but Dwight has Gabe spike Packer's beer with his asthma inhaler, which causes Packer to vomit, and leaves Dwight alone with Nellie. Dwight eventually succeeds in seducing her, and she asks for a key to his room. Dwight scratches off the magnetic strip on his hotel card before giving it to Nellie, stating the seduction was only to gain approval and doesn't intend to have sex with her. She later shows up at his door, drunk, and unsuccessfully attempts to enter.

In "Test the Store", at the Sabre store opening, Dwight attempts to put on a theatrical presentation in order to impress Nellie. Several things go awry; and after Ryan departs, Jim is forced to give the presentation, which, despite a rocky start, impresses the crowd. After the opening, Nellie names Dwight as vice president.

In "Last Day in Florida", she accompanies Dwight, Jim, and Robert California on a golf outing celebrating Dwight's new vice president position. While Robert seems to take a liking to her, he reveals to Jim that he dislikes the business plan for the Sabre store, and that he only approved it because Jo Bennett wanted it. He says that it is now evident that the store is a failure, so he plans to sandbag it at a high-level meeting. However, for this failure he plans to terminate Dwight, the vice president of the project, instead of Nellie (presumably because of her friendship with Jo). Later, when Jim is keeping Dwight from attending the meeting, in hopes of keeping Dwight from getting fired, Packer convinces Nellie to appoint him vice president in Dwight's absence, which she does. During the meeting, Robert chastises Packer, pretending that the Sabre store was a brilliant concept, but that Packer simply botched it in execution. Nellie then steps up, apparently defending Packer, as she tells the board not to blame Packer, but then states to simply blame his upbringing, and the society that "molded this idiotic creature". She says that, while they should fire Packer as an employee, they should not fire him as a man. An infuriated Packer protests this, stating that it is actually Nellie's fault for her poor business plan. Yet, Robert still terminates him instead of Nellie, and it is implied that Robert was impressed at how Nellie manipulated the situation. It also hinted at that Nellie might be interested in Robert romantically, as before, at the golf course, she pretends to play poorly in order for Robert to come around behind her and demonstrate on how she could better swing her golf club.

In "Get the Girl", Nellie travels to the Scranton branch and tries to claim the manager position, while Andy is out of the office. She uses her motto of "if the seat is open, the job is open", to coax Robert into letting her stay. She attempts to win over the rest of the office, save for Jim, Pam and Darryl, by giving them raises.

In "Welcome Party", Jim and Dwight reluctantly help Nellie move into her new apartment. She tells them about a bad breakup she went through with her longtime boyfriend, Henry.

In "Fundraiser", Nellie attempts to befriend Darryl, and they appear to bond a little bit when he buys them some tacos, a food which she has never heard of or tried before; and, after watching her struggle with the mechanics of consuming one, realizes that she truly is trying to be nice to and socialize with her employees.

In "Turf War", it is revealed that Nellie is a shopaholic and is in severe credit card debt, and also that her efforts to adopt a child were turned down because she is single. After Pam discovers this, she decides to be nicer to Nellie, and she strikes up a friendly conversation with her. Nellie reveals to the camera crew that she is deeply moved to have a real friend at the office.

During the eighth-season finale, Andy recruits David Wallace, to help him take back Dunder Mifflin. Andy, after being re-appointed manager, fires Nellie as revenge for stealing his job. After she pleads to him, he rehires her as Special Projects Manager.

== Season 9 ==
At the start of season 9, Andy returns from management training intending to fire Nellie for what she did to him the previous year. After he is informed by Toby Flenderson that Nellie cannot be fired without cause, Andy vows to make life miserable for her, while also putting his newly Michael Scott-esque dislike of Toby on display.

In "Roy's Wedding" Nellie initiates a charity program within the office, which Dwight ridicules, believing charities are useless. When Nellie insists he choose a charity, Dwight mocks her initiative further by deliberately choosing a front organization for the Taliban. To test Dwight's resolve, Nellie has him sign a pledge to live by Taliban law in the office, and then steals his pen, noting that the penalty for theft would require him to cut off her hand, even offering him a knife with which to do so. Though clearly unsettled at this idea, Dwight maintains his bravado for several hours, until Darryl walks in and suggests the two of them watch the movie 127 Hours. Eventually the two become engrossed in James Franco's performance and forget about the hand-cutting.

In "Andy's Ancestry", after being tasked by Andy to research his family tree, to spite him, Nellie falsely tells him that he is related to U.S. First Lady Michelle Obama. Not long afterwards, Pam agrees to help Nellie practice for a driving test, and the two end up bonding when she shows appreciation for Pam's art, which leads to Nellie later asking her to paint a mural in the warehouse.

In "Work Bus", Nellie moves forward with her plans for adoption and asks for Andy to give her a reference as her employer, something he says he will only consider if she tells the truth (as the truth about someone as awful as her will ruin any chances for Nellie to be matched with a child). Andy's girlfriend Erin Hannon, who herself was a foster child who was never adopted, helps Nellie with her application, clearly excited at the prospect of a child being adopted. Andy gives her a scathing non-endorsement, however, leaving her stunned and saddened but stoic. After seeing that this upset Erin even more than Nellie, Andy reconsiders and writes her a more favorable recommendation.

In "Here Comes Treble", Dwight finds an anti-anxiety pill on the floor, and Nellie aids him in investigating who the office "madman" is, all the while trying to convince him that he is making a much bigger deal of it than it actually is. After he sets a trap by leaving the pill out on a plate in the kitchen, Meredith heads right for it, excited about finding a "free upper". Dwight then jumps out and captures her in a net, at which point Nellie frees her from the net and admits to Dwight that the pill is hers, and pops it into her mouth, leaving Dwight stunned. Later, Dwight, rethinking his stand on anxiety medication, now would like some of her pills, claiming that they would help his cousin, Mose. Nellie, understanding that Dwight is having trouble admitting to his anxiety, tells him that she hopes "Mose" feels better. In another subplot involving her, she unintentionally titillates Toby with her Halloween costume, a "sexy" version of himself. At the end of the episode, he is seen giving her a bouquet of flowers, but after she takes her wig off, he realizes that he was only attracted to her because of the costume.

In "Dwight Christmas", at the office Christmas party, Nellie is intrigued when Toby Flenderson mentions he was on the jury for the Scranton Strangler. After inquiring about it, however, Toby proceeds to bore her with a long, drawn-out account that is implied to last for several hours. Nellie finally leans close to Toby and shushes him. A puzzled Toby asks if Nellie intends to kiss him, which she does to save face. An emboldened Toby then gives her an even more passionate kiss. Nellie is horrified to realize Toby has fallen for her, and while she is briefly impressed when he goes to see if the Scranton Strangler is innocent and is nearly killed by the very guilty man, she goes back to showing great disdain for Toby afterwards.

During the "Finale" episode, Nellie comes back to attend the documentary's open panel, and Dwight and Angela's wedding. Nellie avoids Toby, and snidely remarks that she "un-friended" him when he knows about her open-Twitter based personal life. She also says she is living in Poland, "the Scranton of the EU". While at the wedding, former Dunder Mifflin employee Ryan Howard leaves his infant son Drake to run off with his married ex Kelly Kapoor. Nellie tells Kevin that she'll contact Child Services, but instead lets the camera know that if Ryan wants to come back for Drake, he should head to Europe because Nellie will be raising her new son there.

== Behind the scenes ==
Tate originally guest-starred in the seventh-season finale episode, "Search Committee". While she was initially the top choice to join the cast as the Manager, she was unable to join the series, due to her commitment to the West End production of the Shakespeare play, Much Ado About Nothing. However, on October 21, 2011, it was announced that she would be returning to The Office in order to reprise her role of Nellie, who has been hired as the "Misguided special projects manager". It was noted that she will strike up a "Far from professional" relationship with current Sabre CEO, Robert California.

== Reception ==
The Nellie Bertram character received mixed reviews from her initial guest appearance. In her review of "Search Committee", Cindy White, of IGN, wrote "As for Catherine Tate, I'm a fan of her work across the pond – not just as the (Tenth) Doctor's companion Donna Noble, but from her self-titled sketch show as well – so I had high expectations. Unfortunately, she was probably the least compelling of the applicants". In Sam Morgan's recap of the episode, he wrote that "[Tate's] character wasn't that interesting nor competent". In Kaili Markley's review, she wrote "Catherine Tate is brilliant, but the addition of this Nellie Bertram to the show would spell certain disaster for The Office: she is too over-the-top, too obnoxious, too unrealistic, and just plum unlikeable". Meghan Carlson, of BuddyTV, was slightly positive of Nellie, writing that "I hope they'd flesh out the character in a different way. I've seen Tate be LOL-worthy on her UK series innumerable times, but something about her interview didn't feel right. Still, Nellie just might have the right combination of self-assurance and stupidity, if reworked a little, to replace the great Michael Scott".

The reception of the character became more positive when she returned in a regular capacity. In their review of "Tallahassee", TV Equals wrote that they were "Hoping that this special project lasts a very long time so we get much more Nellie Bertram in the future". In his review, Brett Harrison Davinger, of the California Literary Review, wrote that Nellie proved herself to be "A good addition [to the show]". In her review, White wrote that "The character played by Catherine Tate in last season's finale "Search Committee" may not have been that popular with Office fans, but anyone familiar with Tate's work in the U.K. (including her award-winning self-titled comedy sketch show and a season on Doctor Who as the feisty Donna Noble) knows how versatile she is. Tate came back strong as the eccentric Nellie Bertram, president of Special Projects for Sabre, and remained just wacky enough to be amusing without going over the top". Myles McNutt of The A.V. Club, wrote in his review of "Free Family Portrait Studio", that he found Tate's portrayal solid, and that the recent re-characterization of Nellie would help reinvent the show.

Many critics noted how Nellie would play a major part in the final season's story lines. Most also noted how this would give her a second chance to win critics over. Cindy White, of IGN, enjoyed the pairing of Nellie and Pam in "Andy's Ancestry", noting how "Nellie was a lot more tolerable with Pam along for the ride."
