= Get the Girl =

- The Office episode
- Episode no.: Season 8 Episode 19
- Directed by: Rainn Wilson
- Written by: Charlie Grandy
- Cinematography by: Matt Sohn
- Editing by: Claire Scanlon
- Production code: 819
- Original air date: March 15, 2012
- Running time: 23 minutes

Guest appearances
- Brad Morris as Glenn; Georgia Engel as Irene

Episode chronology
← Previous "Last Day in Florida"	Next → "Welcome Party"
- The Office (American season 8)

"Get the Girl" is the nineteenth episode of the eighth season of the American comedy television series The Office, and the show's 171st episode overall. The episode originally aired on NBC in the United States on March 15, 2012. "Get the Girl" was written by Charlie Grandy and directed by series regular Rainn Wilson, who portrays Dwight Schrute.

The series—presented as if it were a real documentary—depicts the everyday lives of office employees in the Scranton, Pennsylvania, branch of the fictional Dunder Mifflin Paper Company. In the episode, Andy Bernard (Ed Helms) drives across the country to get Erin Hannon (Ellie Kemper), who has taken up caring for an elderly woman. Meanwhile, in the Scranton branch, Nellie (Catherine Tate) shows up and tries to claim the manager position.

"Get the Girl" received mixed reviews by television commentators, with multiple critics criticizing the Andy-Erin plot and the character of Nellie Bertram. According to Nielsen ratings, "Get the Girl" was viewed by an estimated 4.88 million viewers and received a 2.3 rating/6% share among adults between the ages of 18 and 49. The episode ranked second in its timeslot and was also the highest-rated NBC series of the night.

== Synopsis ==
Andy Bernard drives all the way to Florida, without telling anyone, to try and win back Erin Hannon, where she has been living with the elderly Irene and her middle-aged grandson, Glenn, as a live-in maid. He surprises Erin by popping out of a delivery box and singing "Signed, Sealed, Delivered I'm Yours", but she is not particularly excited to see him, and states she does not want to go back to Scranton with him. The situation is further complicated when Andy reveals to Erin that he has not yet broken up with his current girlfriend, Jessica. Andy tells Erin he loves her, but she rejects him; Andy subsequently leaves, his feelings crushed. Irene, who had been treating Andy with disdain over the way Erin spoke of him, sees that he is a truly nice person and encourages Erin to go back with him. She runs up to him as he is leaving in his car and they share a kiss before heading back to Scranton.

Nellie Bertram shows up in Scranton after Robert California allows her to have a job there after the failure of the Sabre store. When she is invited to take an open desk, she takes Andy's manager desk, as he is absent. Jim Halpert says she cannot take Andy's job, but Robert is interested in her spontaneous behavior. As acting manager, Nellie decides to give everyone performance reviews. Both Jim and Dwight Schrute refuse to let her proceed, as she is unfamiliar with the other employees. To counter this, Nellie offers Dwight a raise on the spot, and eventually, he and the other employees relent with the promise of raises and other perks, except for Jim. When it is Jim's turn, Jim still refuses. In the end, everyone in the office, except for Jim, applauds her. Nellie promptly begins rearranging the office.

== Production ==
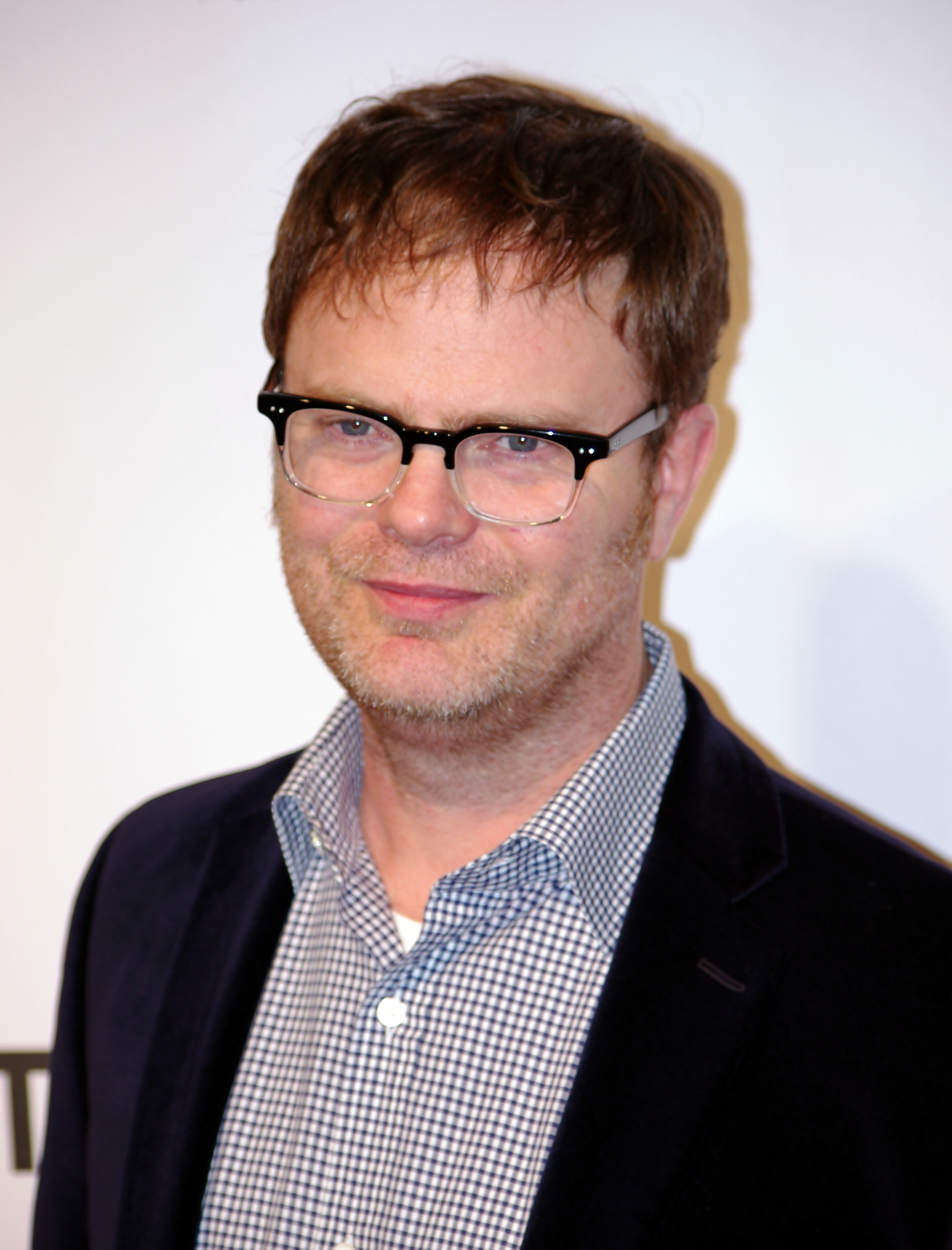
"Get the Girl" was directed by series regular Rainn Wilson.

"Get the Girl" was written by Charlie Grandy, his second eighth season writing credit after "Lotto". The episode was directed by series regular Rainn Wilson, who portrays Dwight Schrute. This episode marked his third directing credit to the series, after the sixth season's "The Cover-Up", and the seventh season's "Classy Christmas".

The Season Eight DVD contains a number of deleted scenes from this episode. Notable cut scenes include Nellie offering to give Meredith, Nate, and Darryl a raise; Robert inviting Nellie out for coffee; and Jim, Pam and Darryl attempting to contact Andy; the office discussing the situation with Nellie as manager, Robert refusing to put his foot down; Andy talking to Erin about his drive to Tallahassee; and Andy telling the camera that he will not give up on their relationship easily.

== Cultural references ==
While shaving along the sea shore, Andy picks up a horseshoe crab and sarcastically thanks BP, a reference to the 2010 Deepwater Horizon oil spill. Georgia Engel's character mentions that her son is going to sue Home Depot, a popular retailer of home improvement and construction products and services. Nellie compares herself to Tinker Bell, telling the office that, in order for her to work for them, they need "to believe".

== Reception ==
=== Ratings ===
"Get the Girl" aired on March 15, 2012. The episode was viewed by an estimated 4.88 million viewers and received a 2.3 rating/6% share among adults between the ages of 18 and 49. This means that it was seen by 2.3% of all 18- to 49-year-olds, and 6% of all 18- to 49-year-olds watching television at the time of the broadcast. This marked a decrease in the ratings from the previous episode, "Last Day in Florida". The episode finished second in its time slot, beating a rerun of the Fox supernatural series Touch and The CW teen drama series The Secret Circle. Despite this, the episode was defeated by the ABC medical drama Grey's Anatomy which drew a 3.0/6% rating. In addition, "Get the Girl" was the highest-rated NBC television episode of the night, barely beating the return of Community.

=== Reviews ===
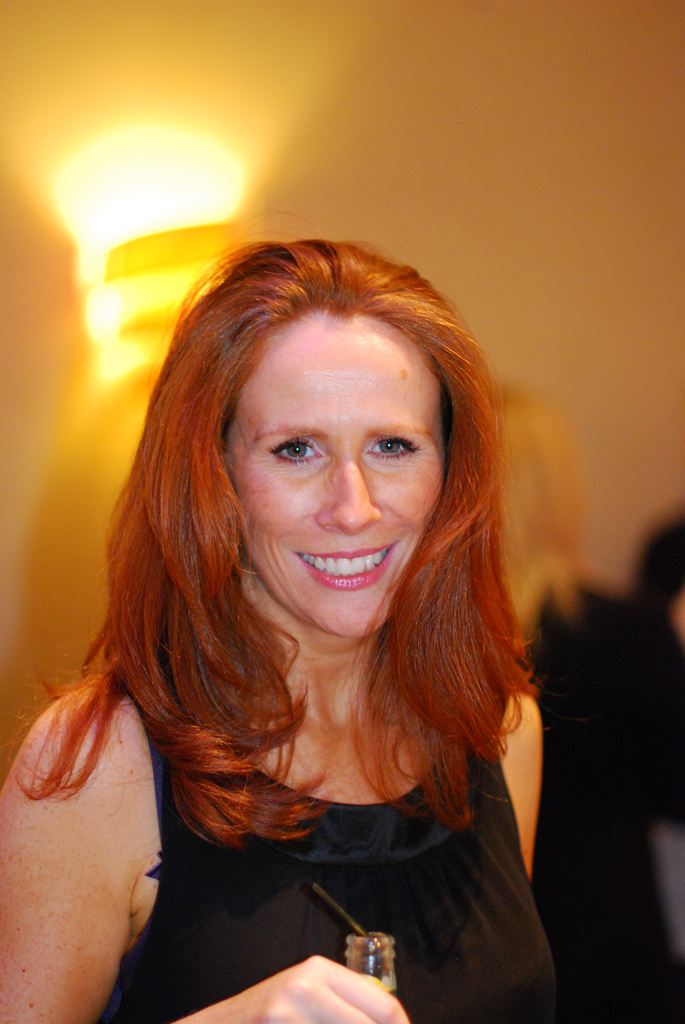
Catherine Tate's performance as Nellie Bertram received mixed reviews from critics

The episode received a wide variety of mixed reviews from critics, ranging from largely negative to moderately positive. Matt Dougherty noted that "Get the Girl" returned The Office "to what it was before the Florida storyline, which is bad." Furthermore, he called the episode "the worst ... of the show simply because it lacked any form of logic or emotion." He ultimately gave the episode a 2 out of 10 rating. A review from Clique Clack called the main plot "miserably insufferable". Other reviews were more mixed. Myles McNutt from The A.V. Club gave the episode a C+ rating. A review from WHTC noted that the episode was "rather predictable, somewhat inconsequential, a bit silly and representative of perhaps a slight step back."

Not all reviews were negative. TV Equals called the episode "pretty funny," particularly praising the episode's cold opening. Jeffrey Hyatt from Screen Crave awarded the episode a 7 out of 10, noting that "There have been worse. And this is another one I will re-watch later and probably like better the second time around." IGN reviewer Cindy White gave the episode a 7.0 out of 10 rating, signifying a "good episode." Brett Harrison Davinger from the California Literary Review awarded the episode "faint praise", noting that it was "slightly greater than the sum of its parts."

Many reviews criticized the Andy-Erin plot. White wrote that, "If the Andy and Erin scenes in this episode were supposed to make me root for them, I'm afraid it didn't quite work." Dougherty wrote, "Was anyone else rooting for Erin to just stay down there? I certainly was." McNutt bluntly wrote, "I'm not buying this relationship." The WHTC review noted that the arc was "a total carbon copy of the Jim/Pam version that sucked us all in years ago."

Reviews were split on the addition of Nellie Bertram to the Scranton office. McNutt criticized Nellie Bertram, noting that, despite the character's potential, the show "places her into the series as a blind antagonist without any sense of what drives her to these actions." Craig McQuinn from The Faster Times argued that the producers of The Office seemed to be using her only because "'British people are ridiculous and are completely different to Americans'". Dan Forcella from TV Fanatics, on the other hand, praised Catherine Tate's acting and her character, writing, "Tate's first appearance last season was intriguing, and her stint as head honcho down in Florida was entertaining, but in "Get the Girl" it became obvious that Nellie Bertram as branch manager could be exactly what The Office needs to stay afloat."

Several reviews criticized the decision to film Erin in front of a green screen for one of her talking heads. White attributed the "terrible green-screen effect" among other things, to Wilson's "offbeat sense of humor and style". McNutt proposed that the reason for the "obnoxious" effect was because the show had lost that lawn set but wanted to add an additional talking head scene.
