= Gettysburg (The Office) =

- The Office episode
- Episode no.: Season 8 Episode 8
- Directed by: Jeffrey Blitz
- Written by: Robert Padnick
- Cinematography by: Matt Sohn
- Editing by: Claire Scanlon
- Production code: 808
- Original air date: November 17, 2011
- Running time: 22 minutes

Guest appearances
- Lindsey Broad as Cathy Simms

Episode chronology
← Previous "Pam's Replacement"	Next → "Mrs. California"
- The Office (American season 8)

"Gettysburg" is the eighth episode of the eighth season of the American comedy television series The Office and the show's 160th episode overall. It was written by Robert Padnick and directed by Jeffrey Blitz. The episode aired on NBC in the United States on November 17, 2011. "Gettysburg" guest stars Lindsey Broad as Cathy Simms.

The series—presented as if it were a real documentary—depicts the everyday lives of office employees in the Scranton, Pennsylvania, branch of the fictional Dunder Mifflin Paper Company. In this episode, Andy Bernard (Ed Helms) takes some of the office staff on a field trip to Gettysburg for inspiration. Meanwhile, the rest of the office, under orders from Robert California (James Spader), are tasked with coming up with a new business idea for Dunder Mifflin. Kevin Malone (Brian Baumgartner) proposes several vending machine ideas that capture California's imagination.

"Gettysburg" is the last episode to feature Jenna Fischer before her maternity leave. The episode received mixed reviews, with commentators mainly criticizing the episode for recycling jokes. According to the Nielsen Media Research, "Gettysburg" drew 5.50 million viewers, and ranked first in its time slot and was the highest-rated NBC show of the night.

== Synopsis ==
Andy Bernard thinks that a field trip to Gettysburg will boost the office morale. Andy is unhappy at Gettysburg with the lack of morale and belief in his leadership and attempts to make an analogy between running a paper company and fighting in the Civil War. Andy starts to lead a haphazard tour, and eventually most of the office members sit down to rest. Jim Halpert and Darryl Philbin follow Andy after he presses on, and eventually tell him to stop trying to impress the office. They explain that no one is responding to his analogies because they are not true, and reinforce the fact that his co-workers like him the way he is.

Dwight Schrute argues with Oscar Martinez during the tour about what he claims is the northernmost battle of the Civil War: the Battle of Schrute Farms. Dwight maintains that its absence from the history books is an example of re-writing history. Oscar maintains that the battle is a fictitious creation. Oscar is annoyed even more when Dwight attempts to convince Erin Hannon that the Battle of Schrute Farms is real. Dwight and Oscar learn that the Battle of Schrute Farms did take place, after tracking down an archivist. The "battle" was really a code term. Schrute Farms was a safe haven for artists and poets (and, as heavily implied, homosexuals), during the Civil War. Oscar finds this fascinating, and Dwight leaves in disgust. Gabe Lewis is sidetracked by people of another tour group who assume that he is an Abraham Lincoln impersonator. He acquiesces and delivers an improvised but applauded performance.

Half of the employees opt to stay at the office. Robert California makes a spontaneous visit, and he asks the remaining people to come up with Dunder Mifflin/Sabre's next big idea. The remaining office people fail to impress Robert with their ideas. Kevin Malone details an idea that he has about cookie placement in the vending machine. Robert gets the impression that he is extremely clever and is speaking only in metaphors. The employees try to offer analogies to Kevin's words, but Robert gives credit to Kevin. Ryan Howard, has been annoyed by the idea of Kevin being creative during the entire day, and with the fact that Robert has been rejecting his ideas. Ryan later tricks Kevin into explaining an idea that Kevin has involving the Big Mac, and Robert realizes that there was no subtext to Kevin's ideas.

== Production ==
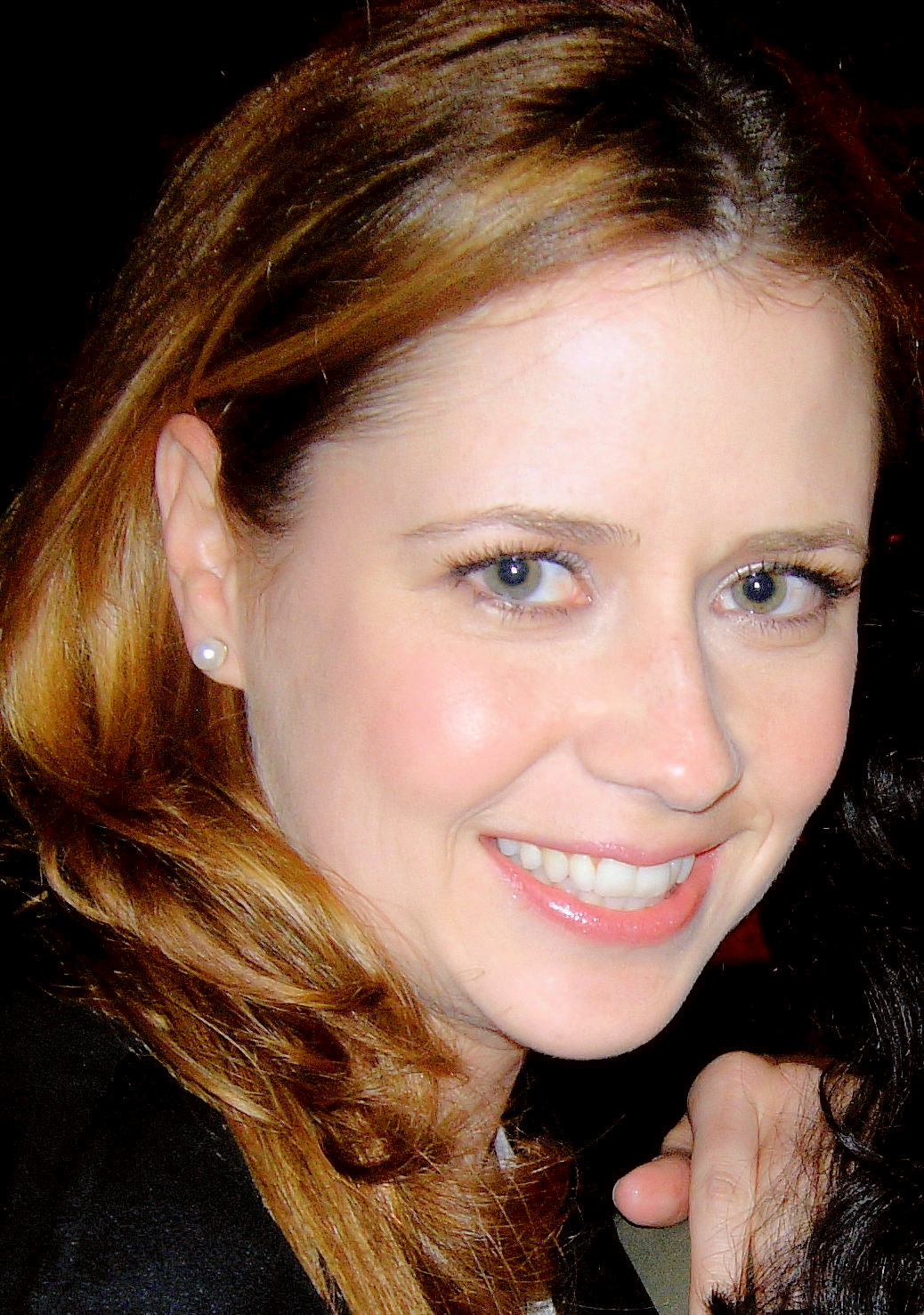
"Gettysburg" is Jenna Fischer's last episode before her maternity leave.

The episode was written by story editor Robert Padnick, his second writing credit for the series after joining the writing staff the previous season. It was directed by frequent director of The Office, Jeffrey Blitz. The episode also marks the second appearance of Lindsey Broad, who plays Cathy, Pam's replacement during her maternity leave. She appeared in a recurring role for the season. Due to Jenna Fischer's actual pregnancy, "Gettysburg" is the last episode of 2011 to feature Pam. The episode was not filmed on location in Gettysburg, Pennsylvania. The A.V. Club reviewer Myles McNutt noted that the writers' used Andy's "overeager qualities" to have the office group skip the official tour, allowing for "some random California heritage site" to stand in for the real Gettysburg. The Season Eight DVD contains a number of deleted scenes from this episode. Notable cut scenes include Andy preparing the office to go to Gettysburg, and Kevin discussing his newfound approval by California. Novak later said that "He thinks Kevin is a genius who speaks in metaphors. Everyone's jealous that Kevin's become his favorite."

== Reception ==
=== Ratings ===
In its original American broadcast on NBC on November 17, 2011, "Gettysburg" was viewed by an estimated 5.50 million viewers and received a 2.9 rating/7 percent share among adults between the ages of 18 and 49. This means that it was seen by 2.9 percent of all 18- to 49-year-olds, and 7 percent of all 18- to 49-year-olds watching television at the time of the broadcast. The episode marked a three percent decrease in the ratings from the previous episode, "Pam's Replacement". Despite this, the episode ranked first in its timeslot, beating the Fox drama series, Bones which received a 2.7 rating/7 percent share, CBS drama, Person of Interest which received a 2.6 rating/7 percent share in the 18–49 demographic, and the American Broadcasting Company (ABC) medical drama, Private Practice which received a 2.6 rating/7 percent share, although all three shows received more total viewers than "Gettysburg".

=== Reviews ===
"Gettysburg" received mixed reviews from critics, ranging from negative to slightly positive. Hollywood writer Hannah Lawrence was heavily critical of the episode and wrote, "This episode seemed like a joke to me. I really didn't like it." What Culture! reviewer Joseph Kratzer gave the episode three out of five stars and wrote, "While the episode was technically satisfactory, it didn't carry much momentum." McNutt referred to the "Battle of Schrute Farms" gag as a "payoff," but was overall negative. He concluded that although "The Office is still capable of finding humor in ... situations [but] it doesn't feel like the show is willing to explore that humor, instead content on making the same statements the show has been making for quite some time." He ultimately gave it a "C−".

Not all reviews were negative. IGN writer Cindy White awarded the episode 7 out of 10, signifying a "good" episode. However, she heavily criticized the recycling of story lines, writing, "It may have been heartwarming in the premiere, but now it feels repetitive, and it's still not funny." M. Giant of Television Without Pity gave the episode a "B−". Chris Plante from New York wrote a generally positively review, saying "No episode has done the ensemble work better than 'Gettysburg', a kind of sitcom buffet, its many stories giving the audience a small taste of every personality. That isn't to say every character has been fleshed out well. ... Andy and California seem off point."

The episode's opening, featuring Pam Halpert (Fischer) faking her water breaking, received mixed reviews. White called the sequence her "favorite part" and felt an empathetic connection to the character. Kratzer claimed that he enjoyed the scene. McNutt, however, wrote that the opening concludes that "Pam and Jim are basically total jerks".
