= Trivia (The Office) =

- The Office episode
- Episode no.: Season 8 Episode 11
- Directed by: B. J. Novak
- Written by: Steve Hely
- Cinematography by: Matt Sohn
- Editing by: David Rogers; Rick Weis
- Production code: 811
- Original air date: January 12, 2012

Guest appearances
- Lindsey Broad as Cathy Simms

Episode chronology
← Previous "Christmas Wishes"	Next → "Pool Party"
- The Office (American season 8)

"Trivia" is the eleventh episode of the eighth season of the American comedy television series The Office, and the show's 163rd episode overall. The episode originally aired on NBC in the United States on January 12, 2012. It was written by Steve Hely and was directed by executive producer B. J. Novak.

In this episode, Oscar Martinez (Oscar Nunez) reveals that he is partaking in a trivia contest in Philadelphia and Andy Bernard (Ed Helms) tries to get the entire office involved. Meanwhile, Dwight Schrute (Rainn Wilson) journeys to Florida and meets with his boss, Robert California (James Spader), in order to explore other job opportunities.

After airing, the episode sparked a debate among fans, as well as critics, as to whether former leading actor Steve Carell had made an uncredited cameo as a member of an opposing trivia team. NBC later denied that Carell had made an appearance and stated that the situation was just a coincidence. "Trivia" received mostly positive reviews from critics, with many noting that the episode marked an improvement from the first part of the season. Despite this, several reviews were critical of the Dwight sub-plot. According to Nielsen Media Research, "Trivia" drew 5.87 million viewers and received a 2.9 rating/7% share in the 18–49 demographic, staying relatively even with the previous three episodes, "Christmas Wishes", "Gettysburg" and "Mrs. California". It ranked third in its timeslot and was the highest-rated NBC series of the night.

== Plot ==
Andy Bernard, worried that he will not be able to meet the 8% quarterly sales growth figures that Robert California asked for by about $800, proposes that everyone in the office buy paper to alleviate some of the burden, but no one is willing. He then asks Oscar Martinez to make a rounding mistake in the books. Oscar tells Andy that he does not have time to make the mistake because he is leaving for a trivia contest with a $1,000 prize in a bar in Philadelphia, Pennsylvania. Andy, encouraged by Darryl Philbin and Jim Halpert, decides to take the entire office to Philadelphia in an attempt to win the money and make up the sales growth difference. At the bar, which turns out to be a gay bar called the Liberty Well, Andy divides the office into three teams: the A-Team consisting of Jim, Darryl, Andy, and Ryan Howard, the B-Team consisting of Stanley Hudson, Phyllis Vance, Creed Bratton, and Cathy Simms, and the "Just For Fun" team consisting of Kevin Malone, Kelly Kapoor, Erin Hannon, and Meredith Palmer. Oscar refuses to join Andy and stays on his original team. Initially, the Dunder Mifflin A-Team does well but soon falters. However, the "Just For Fun" team (calling themselves The Einsteins) does much better than expected because of the group's trivial knowledge on a variety of issues (though at one point, they ironically get a question about Albert Einstein wrong). They make it to the final round against Oscar's team and eventually win thanks to Kevin's correct answers. However, the Just for Fun team later get demolished while trying to win another bar's even more lucrative trivia contest.

Dwight Schrute heads down to Florida to meet with Robert California at the Sabre headquarters to discuss a possible manager position in the printers division. While sitting in the waiting room, Dwight talks to Gabe Lewis, who describes himself as the essential "toilet of the company" who flushes all the unwanted items away. Robert then tells Dwight that he cannot meet with him but will have him meet with Bill, another executive, much to Dwight's frustration. Robert secretly calls Gabe and instructs him to not let Dwight speak with Bill either, but to listen to Dwight's pitch and then reject him. Gabe can barely keep a straight face throughout Dwight's pitch. Dwight, after being told by Gabe that Dwight isn't wanted as a manager, grabs and twists Gabe's arm and forces him to take him to Robert's Florida condo. Initially, Robert tries to spare Dwight's feelings, telling him that his drive and energy would be wasted in a manager's position and attempting to give him a medal as a sign of respect. Dwight resists, so Robert eventually turns him down by telling him he is a better salesman. Dwight then returns to Scranton.

== Production ==
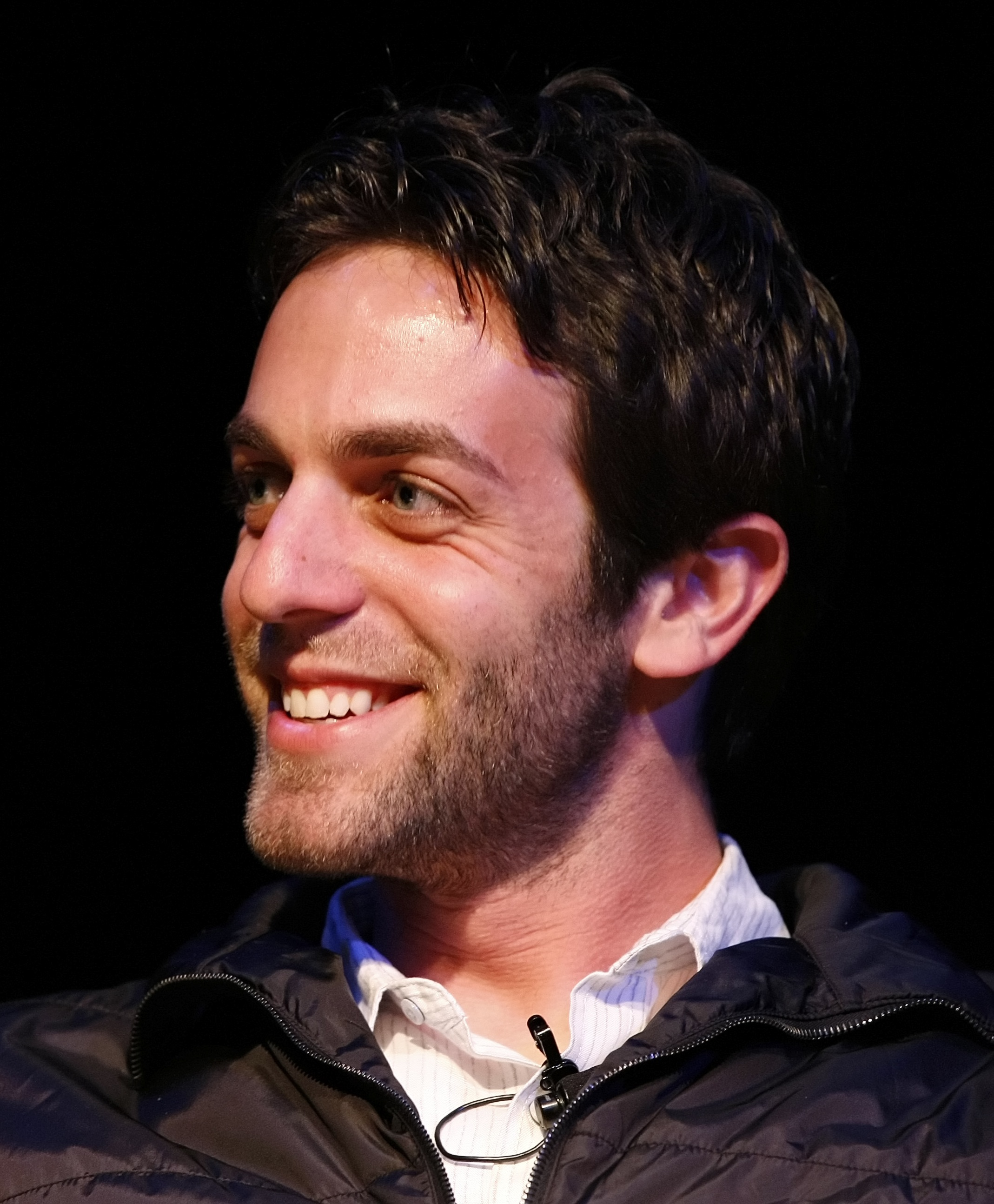
"Trivia" was directed by series star B. J. Novak.

The episode was written by supervising producer Steve Hely, at the time, his second writing credit for the series. It was directed by executive producer and cast member B. J. Novak, who portrays Ryan Howard on the show. The episode also marks the fifth appearance of Lindsey Broad, who plays Cathy, Pam's replacement during her maternity leave. She appeared in a recurring role for the season and she initially appeared in "Pam's Replacement." Due to Jenna Fischer's actual pregnancy, Pam did not appear in the episode. After airing, the episode sparked a debate among fans, as well as critics, as to whether former leading actor Steve Carell had made an uncredited cameo as a member of an opposing trivia team, The Queerstein Bears. NBC later denied that Carell had made an appearance and stated that the situation was just a coincidence. The Season Eight DVD contains a number of deleted scenes from this episode. Notable cut scenes include Andy attempting to get the office to sell $800 worth of paper in a day, and Andy trying to switch team members in order to boost Dunder Mifflin A-Team's chance of winning.

== Cultural references ==
Due to the episode largely taking place at a trivia contest, "Trivia" featured a plethora of cultural references. After Ryan uses his smart phone, the trivia reader chides him for checking his Grindr account, a geosocial networking application for gay men. Dwight compares himself to a Spanish conquistador, coming to Florida to "claim what is rightfully [his]." Several of the trivia teams featured names with culturally related puns. The teams included: The Queerenstein Bears, Joey Triviani, Impish Impresarios, Two Broke Dorks, Jason So-Gay-Kiss, Ladies Gaga, Aesop's Foibles, and Lawrence O-Trivier.

Many of the references were either the answers to trivia questions, or incorrect guesses. The "Einsteins" erroneously guess "See-atle" when asked what the capital of the state that was on Ray Charles' mind when he wrote one of his most famous songs was. After being asked a question about Albert Einstein, the "Einsteins" answer with Thomas Edison, much to the delight of the sarcastic trivia reader. L'Damian Washington is referenced by Ryan incorrectly as the winner of the NBA's Sixth Man of the Year Award in 2011, while Jim incorrectly guesses that it is Shawn Marion. Kelly is able to correctly answer the same question (Lamar Odom) because she cross-referenced her knowledge of Khloe and Lamar and Dancing with the Stars. Kevin knows that the answer to the final trivia question is the 2001 French film Les Jolies Choses, starring Marion Cotillard, because Cotillard "exposes herself a number of times."

== Reception ==
=== Ratings ===
"Trivia" originally aired on NBC in the United States on January 12, 2012. The episode was viewed by an estimated 5.87 million viewers and received a 2.9 rating/7% share among adults between the ages of 18 and 49. This means that it was seen by 2.9% of all 18- to 49-year-olds, and 7% of all 18- to 49-year-olds watching television at the time of the broadcast. The episode remained relatively equal in ratings compared with the previous episode, "Christmas Wishes." The episode finished third in its time slot, being beaten by Grey's Anatomy which received a 3.8 rating/9% share and the CBS drama Person of Interest which received a 3.2 rating/8% share in the 18–49 demographic. The episode, however, did manage to beat the Fox drama series The Finder and The CW drama series The Secret Circle.

=== Reviews ===
"Trivia" received relatively positive reviews, although many critics did not enjoy the Florida sub-plot. Many television critics agreed that "Trivia" was a marked improvement over many of the episodes in the first part of the season. Craig McQuinn from The Faster Times wrote, "Aside from a few weak moments, 'Trivia' was a solid episode of The Office and a vast improvement over most of the episodes this season." Myles McNutt from The A.V. Club awarded the episode a B+ rating and wrote positively of the trivia plot, saying, "When The Office reaches its next hiatus, and then its subsequent return, I’ll find myself hoping for more like the trivia side of 'Trivia', storylines that even after contrived introductions can simply sit back and let the character-driven jokes take over the narrative." Chris Plante from New York magazine explained that "If you plan to continue watching The Office, here’s my advice ... You need to forget the negative energy this show attracts. Start thinking of Season Eight like a reboot." He concluded that "The Office is not irreparable. It’s not great either, but there is some marked improvement here over the worst episodes from the first half of the season." Lizzie Fuhr from BuzzSugar.com wrote positively on both the trivia A-plot and the Dwight and Robert B-plot. TV Fanatic reviewer Dan Forcella called the trivia conceit "quite fun" and awarded the episode 3.5 out of 5 stars. The Huffington Post wrote that "The Office continues to find fun and unique ways to spotlight how mundane office life can be by showing ways the gang finds to fill their day." Alan Sepinwall from HitFix, who was notably critical of the new season, called the episode "charming." IGN reviewer Cindy White noted that the episode bore stylistic similarities to the third episode of the British version of the show, entitled "The Quiz", writing that "while 'Trivia' does loosely allude to that pub quiz with a bar trivia night, that turns out to be the only thing the two have in common." She did, however, positively write about the humor of the episode, noting that, "the writers squeezed some good laughs out of the idea, and it feels good to be laughing again at The Office."

While a large majority of critics praised the main trivia storyline, many reviews criticized the Dwight and Robert plot. McNutt wrote that, "As the trivia storyline was building momentum, the Florida storyline was killing that same momentum, a push-and-pull that the trivia ended up winning." Forcella explained that "the titular storyline of the gang playing 'Trivia' in Philadelphia worked really well, but the forced trio in Florida definitely did not." Jill Mader from InsidePulse.com wrote, "All in all, I thought it was an inconsistent episode – I liked the trivia storyline, but the Dwight stuff really fell flat for me."
