= Pool Party (The Office) =

- The Office episode
- Episode no.: Season 8 Episode 12
- Directed by: Charles McDougall
- Written by: Owen Ellickson
- Cinematography by: Matt Sohn
- Editing by: Claire Scanlon
- Production code: 812
- Original air date: January 19, 2012

Guest appearances
- Lindsey Broad as Cathy Simms; Ameenah Kaplan as Val Johnson; Eleanor Seigler as Jessica

Episode chronology
← Previous "Trivia"	Next → "Jury Duty"
- The Office (American season 8)

"Pool Party" is the twelfth episode of the eighth season of the American comedy television series The Office, and the show's 164th episode overall. It originally aired on NBC in the United States on January 19, 2012. It was written by Owen Ellickson, directed by Charles McDougall, and guest-starred Lindsey Broad and Eleanor Seigler.

The series—presented as if it were a real documentary—depicts the everyday lives of office employees in the Scranton, Pennsylvania, branch of the fictional Dunder Mifflin Paper Company. In this episode, Robert California (James Spader) decides to sell his mansion following his divorce and Kevin Malone (Brian Baumgartner) suggests that he have an office pool party. There, Erin Hannon (Ellie Kemper) tries to make Andy Bernard (Ed Helms) jealous by flirting with Dwight Schrute (Rainn Wilson). Meanwhile, Robert gives everyone a tour of his massive home.

"Pool Party" received mostly mixed reviews from critics, with many criticizing the episode's lack of a finite plot. According to Nielsen Media Research, "Pool Party" drew 6.02 million viewers and received a 3 rating/7% share in the 18–49 demographic, marking a slight increase from the previous episode, "Trivia". The episode ranked third in its timeslot, and was the highest-rated NBC series of the night.

== Synopsis ==
After Robert California is forced to sell his mansion at the behest of his ex-wife following his divorce, Kevin Malone suggests that he have an office pool party. Andy Bernard takes his girlfriend Jessica to the party and brings an engagement ring his Jessica-approving mother gave him, albeit without a center stone. The ring goes missing from Andy's pants and he is horrified that he cannot find it. Kelly Kapoor and Phyllis Vance later find the ring and, thinking it had belonged to Robert’s wife, decide that it is bad luck and must be destroyed, setting it in the pool atop a tiny pyre.

Erin Hannon, having been told by Meredith Palmer that Andy followed her home after the Christmas party, decides to make Andy jealous by flirting with Dwight Schrute. Dwight initially refuses, but, after realizing that Erin's choosing him as her co-conspirator is flattering to his attractiveness, agrees to help. The two flirt outrageously whenever Andy is close by, but Andy does not notice, as he is too busy worrying about the missing ring. To ensure Andy's attention, Erin and Dwight challenge Andy and Jessica to a series of chicken fights in the pool. After several defeats, Erin is so determined to win a match that she pushes Dwight to the point where he passes out in the water, ending the game. In a final attempt to make Andy jealous, Dwight tells Andy he wants to pursue a romance with Erin but wants to avoid an "Angela kind of situation" between them. Andy assures Dwight that he and Erin are through but, at the mention of Dwight having sex with Erin that very night, suggests that Dwight take things slowly instead, leading Dwight to pointedly tell him, "You're an idiot." Erin later swims up to Andy with the lost ring, having recognized the Bernard family seal. Andy admits that he is confused about his feelings for Jessica, making Erin very happy.

While most of the employees are congregated in the pool area, Robert gives some of the guys - Jim Halpert, Gabe Lewis, Ryan Howard, Oscar Martinez, and Toby Flenderson - a tour of his massive home, spending most of the time mournfully describing how it was intended to be the location for wild Bacchanalias. Ruing that his wine cellar will only "go to the lawyers" if left undrunk, he opens it to those at the party, who proceed to get drunk with him. Oscar bonds with Toby after he notices Toby's great wine choice, though Toby just picked it randomly. Toby plays along, glad to be making a friend, but laments the consequences he will later have to face. Jim had intended to make a token appearance at Robert's party and quickly return home to his wife and kids; however, Robert, sensing his reluctance to be there, insists that Jim stay for the duration of the tour; in order to punish him for laughing at an inopportune moment earlier that day as Robert had complained about having to sell his house. Gabe and Ryan brown-nose Robert throughout the entire night. Eventually, Robert realizes that he is hosting one of the parties he had always imagined, at which point he jumps into the pool completely naked, followed by Gabe and Ryan. Jim takes this as his cue to leave, sneaking away and driving home at top speed, even driving on the lawn and running over a mailbox on the way out. At the end of the night, Gabe and Ryan, both drunk and unwilling to concede defeat to the other, remain at the party with Robert even as the CEO passes out.

== Production ==
The episode was written by co-producer Owen Ellickson, his first writing credit for the series after joining the writing staff in the eighth season. It was directed by Charles McDougall, his seventh directing credit for the series. The episode also marks the sixth appearance of Lindsey Broad, who plays Cathy, Pam's replacement during her maternity leave. Due to Jenna Fischer's actual pregnancy, Pam did not appear in the episode. The Season Eight DVD contains a number of deleted scenes from this episode. Notable cut scenes include Erin and Dwight taking turns suggestively massaging and stretching each other, Erin talking to the camera about her convoluted relationship with Andy, and Robert showing his guests his "shame" room.

== Cultural references ==
The songs "Big White Elephant" and "Model Homes" by the band In-Flight Safety were featured during scenes at the party. The song "Can't Complain" by Bomb the Music Industry! appeared around 14 minutes in. Many of the references were a result of Robert California bemoaning his position in life. He mentions early on in the episode that, "The 1% are hurting too", a reference to the slogan of the Occupy movement. During the tour of his home theater, California explained that he had it created to watch Caligula, Last Tango in Paris, and Emmanuelle 2, but that the last two movies he watched in there were Marley & Me and On Golden Pond.

== Reception ==
=== Ratings ===
"Pool Party" originally aired on NBC in the United States on January 19, 2012. The episode was viewed by an estimated 6.02 million viewers and received a 3 rating/7% share among adults between the ages of 18 and 49. The episode marked a slight increase in ratings compared to the previous episode, "Trivia." Even though "Pool Party" was the highest rated NBC television episode of the night, it finished third in its time slot behind Grey's Anatomy (3.4 rating/8% share) and the CBS drama Person of Interest (3.3 rating/8% share) in the 18–49 demographic and ahead of the Fox drama series The Finder and The CW drama series The Secret Circle. It was the last episode of The Office to be viewed by more than 6 million viewers.

=== Reviews ===
Many reviewers rated the episode very highly. WhatCulture critic Joseph Kratzer awarded the episode four out of five stars and wrote, "Now that's what I'm talking about – few things are better in art than having your expectations overturned and 'The Pool Party' pleasantly surprised me with the efficacy of its execution." Jeffrey Hyatt from ScreenCrave gave the episode a 9/10 rating and wrote, "I think 'Pool Party' is my favorite episode so far this season. The Robert California and Erin/Dwight/Andy story lines were rock solid. Previous excursions out of the office have been blah, but the pool party setting really complimented the ensemble – and the sharp writing." Michael Tedder from New York Magazine called the episode the season's second best, after "Trivia." In addition, many critics wrote positively of the characters and their actions. Jill Mader from InsidePulse wrote that while, "[the pool party] storyline itself was just OK ... Ellie Kemper was hilarious." Many reviewers, including McNutt and Forcella, found Kevin's lines and actions to be particularly memorable, most notably, his declaration that Val was racist after she asked if Darryl swims. A variety of reviewers found the cold-opening, featuring Stanley and Dwight combining to prank Jim's attempt to get Stanley to laugh by placing meatballs in Dwight's desk, funny.

Among critical reviewers the episode's lack of a cohesive plot was the top complaint. Myles McNutt from The A.V. Club awarded the episode a C rating, saying, "'Pool Party' was so loosely structured that it relied heavily on the characters to carry the narrative, and the result was some languid storytelling which gave me way too much time to think about missed opportunities, failed experiments, and the increasing burden of a show without any momentum." Dan Forcella from TVFanatic gave the episode three-and-a-half stars out of five and wrote, "There were bits and pieces of each story that worked in 'Pool Party,' but neither Robert's stroll through parties never had, nor Erin's endeavor to make Andy jealous, came together to make completely funny or interesting tales." The Huffington Post wrote that, "Once [at the titular pool part], the plot bits were so loose it might have been difficult for casual fans to follow it all." Craig McQuinn from The Faster Times wrote, "'Pool Party' was one of those episodes where you can tell the writers didn't know what else to do. ... This is filler, really, which unfortunately tends to be unavoidable when you do 22-episode seasons and you're eight years in." Many reviews were critical of the continued Erin-Andy romance taking center stage. McNutt wrote, "I still really do not care about Andy and Erin as a relationship. The show's approach to this storyline ... is to have Andy enjoying a fairly normal evening with his girlfriend Jessica while Erin acts like a crazy person in an effort to get his attention." Forcella noted that, while the Erin and Dwight pairing was funny, their attempts to make Andy jealous were not successful, as Andy's sub-plots were deemed not funny and "boring."
