= The Office (American TV series) season 8 =

The Office
- Season 8
- DVD cover
- Showrunner: Paul Lieberstein
- Starring: Rainn Wilson; John Krasinski; Jenna Fischer; B. J. Novak; Ed Helms; James Spader; Catherine Tate; Leslie David Baker; Brian Baumgartner; Creed Bratton; Kate Flannery; Mindy Kaling; Ellie Kemper; Angela Kinsey; Paul Lieberstein; Oscar Nunez; Craig Robinson; Phyllis Smith; Zach Woods
- No. of episodes: 24

Release
- Original network: NBC
- Original release: September 22, 2011 – May 10, 2012

Season chronology
- ← Previous; Season 7 Next → Season 9

The eighth season of the American television comedy The Office commenced airing on NBC in the United States on September 22, 2011, and concluded on May 10, 2012, consisting of 24 episodes. The series is an American adaptation of the British comedy series of the same name, and is presented in a mockumentary format, portraying the daily lives of office employees in the Scranton, Pennsylvania branch of the fictitious Dunder Mifflin Paper Company. The eighth season of The Office aired on Thursdays at 9:00 p.m. (Eastern) in the United States as part of the "Comedy Night Done Right" television block. It stars Rainn Wilson, John Krasinski, Jenna Fischer, B. J. Novak, Ed Helms, and James Spader, with supporting performances from Catherine Tate, Leslie David Baker, Brian Baumgartner, Creed Bratton, Kate Flannery, Mindy Kaling, Ellie Kemper, Angela Kinsey, Paul Lieberstein, Oscar Nunez, Craig Robinson, Phyllis Smith, and Zach Woods. This was the first season without Steve Carell as Michael Scott in the lead role and the only one to not feature the character in any onscreen capacity, although he is occasionally mentioned.

The eighth season largely centers on Andy Bernard's (Ed Helms) ascension to regional manager, as well as the antics of Robert California (James Spader), the new CEO of Sabre, a fictional printer company that owns Dunder Mifflin. Halfway through the season, Dwight Schrute (Rainn Wilson)—along with Jim Halpert (John Krasinski), Stanley Hudson (Leslie David Baker), Ryan Howard (B. J. Novak), Erin Hannon (Ellie Kemper), and Cathy Simms (Lindsey Broad)—travel to Florida to help set up a Sabre Store, where Nellie Bertram (Catherine Tate) is introduced. Eventually, former CFO of Dunder Mifflin David Wallace (Andy Buckley) buys back the company, firing California.

Despite debuting with moderate viewing figures, the departure of Carell affected the show's ratings, which fell as the season progressed. The season ranked as the eighty-seventh-most watched television series during the 2011–12 television year and saw a dramatic decrease in ratings from the previous season. Critical reception was polarized. Many critics argued that the series should have ended after the departure of Carell; many also felt that the season recycled storylines from past episodes. Other critics were more positive, complimenting various actors and their characters. It marked the first time since season one that the show received no Emmy nominations.

== Production ==
The eighth season of The Office was the last season of the show to be produced by Universal Media Studios and Reveille Productions before the companies were renamed "Universal Television" and "Shine America", respectively. It was also produced by Deedle-Dee Productions. The show is based on the British comedy series of the same name, which was created by Ricky Gervais and Stephen Merchant for the British Broadcasting Corporation (BBC). This season of The Office was produced by Greg Daniels and Paul Lieberstein—the latter of whom served as the showrunner. Returning writers from the previous season included Lieberstein, Charlie Grandy, Justin Spitzer, Carrie Kemper, Daniel Chun, Robert Padnick, Aaron Shure, Steve Hely, Amelie Gillette, Mindy Kaling, and B. J. Novak; the latter two were both also credited as executive producers. It was previously unknown whether Kaling would write for the series any longer. Kaling herself confirmed via her Twitter page that she would write the Christmas-themed episode, "Christmas Wishes", which was the last episode to use the "Universal Media Studios" logo. Three new writers joined the staff beginning in season eight: Owen Ellickson, Allison Silverman and Dan Greaney. The season also saw the directorial debuts of cast members Ed Helms and Brian Baumgartner; Helms directed the episodes "Christmas Wishes" and "Welcome Party" and Baumgartner directed "After Hours".

The series was renewed for an eighth season on March 17, 2011, began filming on July 25, 2011, and the season concluded filming on March 9, 2012. Jenna Fischer's pregnancy was written into the show, and Pam was again pregnant at the start of the season with a boy as she was in real life. Unlike the sixth season, there was no episode focusing on the baby's birth; it was instead announced on a blog. In an interview, executive producer Lieberstein stated that, with the departure of Michael Scott, the writers would explore further into the other characters on the show, such as centering on a specific character for an episode. On January 25, 2012, news broke that NBC was planning a spin-off series starring Rainn Wilson as Dwight Schrute, that would have been set at Schrute Farms, Dwight's bed-and-breakfast and beet farm. The spin-off would have been executive produced by Wilson, Paul Lieberstein, Ben Silverman, and Howard Klein. Due to his initial involvement in the spin-off, Lieberstein stepped down as showrunner of The Office. On October 29, 2012, it was revealed that NBC was not going forward with the proposed spin-off, although the original backdoor pilot, "The Farm" aired later in the ninth season.

=== Casting ===
Cody Horn, who guest-starred in the seventh season as Jordan Garfield, was originally supposed to be featured as a recurring character this season, but she did not return. The eighth season introduced several new characters. Stephen Collins, Dee Wallace and Josh Groban were cast as Andy's father, mother and brother, respectively, and appeared in the episode "Garden Party". From the episodes "Pam's Replacement" to "Last Day in Florida", Lindsey Broad had a recurring guest-star spot as Cathy Simms, Pam's temporary replacement while she was on maternity leave, and who remained employed at the company for a while after. Maura Tierney appeared in "Mrs. California", playing California's wife. Catherine Tate returned to reprise her role as Nellie Bertram, in a major arc starting in the episode "Tallahassee". Despite reports that she would also get romantically involved with Robert, this never occurred. Two writers for the animated comedy series The Simpsons, Matt Selman and Matt Warburton, appeared in the Kaling-scripted episode "Test the Store", and Simpsons star Dan Castellaneta appeared in the episode "Turf War". While, it was initially announced that the season would introduce Stanley Hudson's "other daughter and a new male addition to the accounting department", these new characters never appeared.

At the time, this season marked the final year that some cast members—notably Helms, Fischer, Novak, and Krasinski—were signed on for the show, as their contracts expired at the end of the season; this caused speculation that several members of the main cast would leave the series following this season. The eighth season was Novak's last as a series regular, although he made a couple of recurring appearances in the ninth season. It was also Kaling's final full season, due to her pilot, The Mindy Project, being picked up by Fox. On February 28, 2012, it was announced that Spader would not return for a ninth season of the show. There was initial speculation that following the eighth season, Daniels was considering rebooting the series due to the possible departures of main cast members. However, a new deal was negotiated with NBC, and all the main cast members—sans Spader, Novak, and Kaling—would return for the ninth season; NBC also announced that Catherine Tate would become a series regular.

== Cast ==
The Office employs an ensemble cast. Most of the main characters, and some supporting ones, are based on characters from the British version of The Office. While these characters normally have the same attitudes and perceptions as their British counterparts, the roles have been redesigned to better fit the American show. The show is known for its large cast size, many of whom are known particularly for their improvisational work.

=== Main ===
- Rainn Wilson as Dwight Schrute, based upon Gareth Keenan, who is the office's top-performing sales representative.
- John Krasinski as Jim Halpert, a sales representative and prankster, who is based upon Tim Canterbury, and is married to Pam Halpert, the office administrator.
- Jenna Fischer as Pam Halpert, who is based on Dawn Tinsley, is shy, but is often a cohort with Jim in his pranks on Dwight. She is pregnant during the first episodes of the season and leaves midway through the season.
- B. J. Novak as Ryan Howard, a temporary worker, who is based on Ricky Howard and Neil Godwin.
- Ed Helms as Andy Bernard, the newly promoted manager—who was previously a salesman—and boastful Cornell alumnus whose love for a cappella music and awkward social skills generates mixed feelings from his employees. Andy is an original character, meaning he has no English equivalent from Gervais's series.
- James Spader as Robert California, the eccentric CEO of Sabre. Spader reprises his guest-starring role from the seventh season, and joined the regular cast to replace Kathy Bates's character.

=== Starring ===
- Catherine Tate as Nellie Bertram, the president of Sabre's special projects, who later usurps Andy's role as regional manager.
- Leslie David Baker as Stanley Hudson, a grumpy salesman.
- Brian Baumgartner as Kevin Malone, a dim-witted accountant, who is based on Keith Bishop.
- Creed Bratton as Creed Bratton, the office's strange quality assurance officer.
- Kate Flannery as Meredith Palmer, the promiscuous supplier relations representative.
- Mindy Kaling as Kelly Kapoor, the pop-culture obsessed customer service representative.
- Ellie Kemper as Erin Hannon, the receptionist and love interest of Andy.
- Angela Kinsey as Angela Martin, a judgemental accountant.
- Paul Lieberstein as Toby Flenderson, the sad-eyed human resources representative.
- Oscar Nunez as Oscar Martinez, an intelligent accountant, who is also gay.
- Craig Robinson as Darryl Philbin, the warehouse manager.
- Phyllis Smith as Phyllis Vance, a motherly saleswoman.
- Zach Woods as Gabe Lewis, the director of Sabre sales.

=== Recurring ===
- Mark Proksch as Nate Nickerson, a warehouse worker.
- Ameenah Kaplan as Val Johnson, a warehouse worker and Darryl's love interest.
- Hugh Dane as Hank Tate, the building's security guard.
- Lindsey Broad as Cathy Simms, a temporary worker.
- Eleanor Seigler as Jessica, Andy's girlfriend.
- Jack Coleman as Robert Lipton, a state senator and Angela's husband.
- David Koechner as Todd Packer, a rude and offensive employee, now working in Florida after Dwight and Jim tried to get him fired.
- Georgia Engel as Irene, an old woman from Florida.
- Andy Buckley as David Wallace, the former CFO of Dunder Mifflin.

=== Notable guests ===
- Stephen Collins as Walter Bernard Sr., Andy's father.
- Josh Groban as Walter Bernard Jr., Andy's brother.
- Dee Wallace as Ellen Bernard, Andy's mother.
- Maura Tierney as Susan California, Robert's wife.
- Brett Gelman as an unnamed magician that Pam hires for Nellie's welcome party.
- Sendhil Ramamurthy as Ravi, a pediatric surgeon and Kelly's new boyfriend.
- Chris Bauer as Harry Jannerone, a salesman from the Syracuse, New York branch.
- Dan Castellaneta as Mr. Ramish, the CEO of Prestige Direct.

== Reception ==
=== Ratings ===
Ratings for each episode of The Office that aired this season.^{i}

The series aired on Thursdays at 9:00 p.m. on NBC. The season premiere, "The List" received a 3.9/10 percent share in the Nielsen ratings among viewers aged 18 to 49, meaning that 3.9 percent of viewers aged 18 to 49 watched the episode, and 10 percent of viewers watching television at the time watched the episode. "The List" was the highest-rated episode of the season. Despite this, it became the lowest-rated season premiere of the series since the series premiere. The rest of the season was unable to receive more than seven million viewers. The twenty-second episode, "Fundraiser", received only 4.17 million viewers, making it, at the time, the lowest-rated episode of The Office to ever air (although it was later beaten by several ninth-season episodes the following year). The season finale, "Free Family Portrait Studio", was viewed by 4.49 million viewers, making it the lowest finale for The Office to air, beating the first-season finale "Hot Girl", which was viewed by 4.8 million viewers. The drop in ratings led to a lower ad-price for the series, with an average cost of $178,840 per 30-second commercial. Despite this, the show was still one of NBC's highest-rated shows and ranked as the most expensive ad-cost for any NBC scripted series during the year it aired. Despite the lower live ratings, Nielsen Soundscan announced that The Office added up to 44 percent to its next-day "live plus same day" 18–49 rating when additional time-shifted viewing was added, such as DVRing.

The season ranked as the eighty-seventh-most watched television series during the 2011–12 season, with an average of 6.506 million viewers. The season also ranked as the thirty-second-most watched television series in the 18- to 49-year-old demographic. In this category, the show was viewed by an estimated 4.376 million viewers per episode and received a 3.42 rating/9 percent share among adults between 18 and 49. This means that, on average, the season was viewed by 3.42 percent of all 18- to 49-year-olds, and 9 percent of all 18- to 49-year-olds watching television at the time of the broadcast.

=== Critical response ===
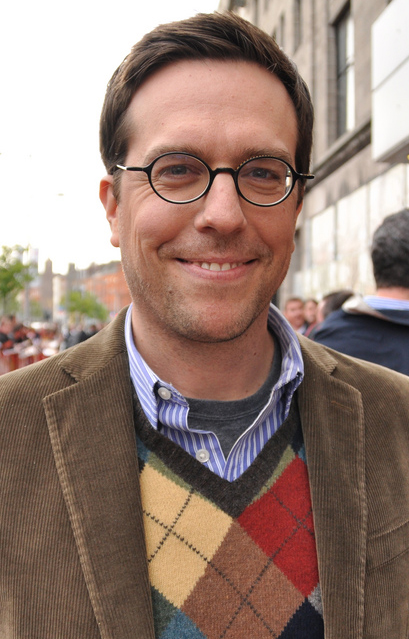
Ed Helms received mixed reviews for his portrayal of Andy Bernard

The eighth season of The Office received mixed reviews. While some critics felt that the show was still humorous in its eighth year, many others argued that the program should have ended after the departure of Steve Carell. The A.V. Club reviewer Myles McNutt criticized Robert California's role, noting that he is a character that "the narrative reacts to as opposed to something actually involved in the narrative". Alan Sepinwall of HitFix criticized Ed Helms' comedic performance as manager (calling him "a softer version of Michael Scott"), as well as the toning down of Robert California from his appearance in the show's seventh season's finale, "Search Committee". Sepinwall also expressed disappointment that many of the supporting characters were seemingly transformed into mere caricatures of their former selves. He stopped reviewing a majority of the Season 8 episodes since "Pam's Replacement", due to his distaste for the series. Time writer James Poniewozik also criticized the choice of Andy as manager, instead arguing that Jim should have gotten the job so the series could have been more ensemble-oriented. New York named Andy Bernard one of the most annoying TV characters of 2011. Early during the season's airing, Matt Zoller Seitz of Salon wrote a review in which he called the post-Michael Scott era of The Office "warmer and more reflective". After the season finished airing, however, Seitz penned another review, writing: "Fact is, the show's first post-Steve Carell year has been a mess, at times bordering on a disaster". McNutt gave the season a "C" grade overall, writing that the season finale, "Free Family Portrait Studio" was "a disheartening conclusion to the show's worst season, offering little optimism to sustain our already dwindling enthusiasm over the summer months."

Bret Fetzer of Amazon.com wrote that "it's best to approach this season as if it were a completely new series". He felt that it is unfair to compare the quality of this season to that of past seasons because "the series' previous heights were so very high". However, he called the year "uneven", because episodes would range from putting "Andy into Michael Scott-ish situations" to "seek[ing] out new angles on the well-established web of interpersonal conflicts". This vacillation between extremes meant that the episodes "sometimes" work. Hank Stuever of The Washington Post named the series the tenth-best series of 2011, specifically praising the actors' ability in "Mrs. California" to deliver cringe humor without Carell. TV Guide named it an honorable mention on their list of the best TV shows of 2011. Price Peterson from TV.com called the series "still one of the best shows on TV" and argued that, while "Season 8 definitely wasn't the show's best", the season "sneaked in some genuinely great jokes, new characters, and affecting plotlines." Despite the lackluster reviews many of the episodes received, many critics praised Ellie Kemper's performance as Erin Hannon. McNutt noted that "regardless of how down I was on this or any other episode, Ellie Kemper really has been tremendous all season." In addition, Kemper's performance in the episodes "Spooked," "Christmas Wishes," "Pool Party," and "Special Project," in particular, were praised by critics.

In retrospect, many cast and crew members felt that the season was not the show's best. Rainn Wilson said that the season made some mistakes "creatively"; for instance, he argued that the chemistry between Spader and Helms was "a bit dark" and that the show should have gone for a "brighter and more energized" relationship. Brian Baumgartner felt that the show "stayed status quo [with the previous year], but without a key piece" and "didn't make a firm decision" on the direction it was headed. Ben Silverman, one of the show's producers, said that "it didn't have the sense of purpose and focus" that the next season would have.

== Episodes ==
In the following table, "U.S. viewers (million)" refers to the number of Americans who viewed the episode on the night of broadcast. Episodes are listed by the order in which they aired, and may not necessarily correspond to their production codes.

No. overall	No. in season	Title	Directed by	Written by	Original release date	Prod. code	U.S. viewers (millions)
153	1	"The List"	B. J. Novak	B. J. Novak	September 22, 2011	8002	7.64
Robert California (James Spader) becomes the new manager of Dunder Mifflin, Scranton, but becomes the new company CEO after talking to Jo Bennett. Andy Bernard (Ed Helms) is chosen by California to become the new regional manager. When Robert leaves his open notebook by reception, Erin discovers a list which divides the office employees' names. Pam and Jim photocopy it, and the office goes crazy trying to figure out its meaning. The problem worsens when Robert invites the left-hand side to lunch. Eventually, California explains that the lists are of the "winners" and "losers". After hearing this, an impassioned Andy defends his fellow coworkers.
154	2	"The Incentive"	Charles McDougall	Paul Lieberstein	September 29, 2011	8001	6.70
Robert challenges the Dunder Mifflin staffers to double their sales. Andy decides to create an incentive program; he promises the office that he will tattoo a picture of their choosing on his buttocks if they meet the sales quota, which they do in only one day. The office then makes Andy get a tattoo of a puppy. Pam Halpert (Jenna Fischer) becomes unlikely friends with Angela Lipton (Angela Kinsey), who is also pregnant.
155	3	"Lotto"	John Krasinski	Charlie Grandy	October 6, 2011	8005	5.82
The entire warehouse staff quits after winning the lottery, leaving Andy (Ed Helms) and Darryl Philbin (Craig Robinson) to scramble for replacements, while Jim Halpert (John Krasinski), Kevin Malone (Brian Baumgartner) and Erin Hannon (Ellie Kemper) get a taste of the warehouse life. Darryl eventually confronts Andy about his jealous feelings that Andy was chosen as manager, and Andy delivers a speech that defends California's choice.
156	4	"Garden Party"	David Rogers	Justin Spitzer	October 13, 2011	8004	6.08
Andy throws a garden party at Schrute Farms to impress Robert, with his parents (Stephen Collins and Dee Wallace) and brother (Josh Groban) in attendance. Andy is disappointed that even at his own party, his father shows obvious favoritism towards his brother. A conversation between Andy and his father is later broadcast via a baby monitor to the rest of the members of the office. In the meantime, Dwight Schrute (Rainn Wilson) works to make it a classy event, on the behest of a book that is an elaborate prank by Jim.
157	5	"Spooked"	Randall Einhorn	Carrie Kemper	October 27, 2011	8006	5.53
Erin tries to make the annual Halloween party spooky and non-childish, with help from Gabe Lewis (Zach Woods). Dwight becomes friends with Robert's son (David Mazouz), and Pam and Jim debate the existence of ghosts. Meanwhile, Robert tries to figure out everyone's deepest fears in order to culminate the party with a specially-tailored ghost story.
158	6	"Doomsday"	Troy Miller	Daniel Chun	November 3, 2011	8003	6.15
In order to improve efficiency, Dwight installs a doomsday device that will send an email to California and suggest the closing of the branch. After the maximum number of mistakes is made on the first day, the email is sent but the office works to counteract it; Jim is sent to distract California, whereas Pam—among others—attempts to talk Dwight into dismantling his machine. Meanwhile, Gabe attempts to court the new warehouse worker, Val (Ameenah Kaplan), by trying to put Darryl down.
159	7	"Pam's Replacement"	Matt Sohn	Allison Silverman	November 10, 2011	8007	5.96
Pam trains a temporary worker, Cathy Simms (Lindsey Broad), to take her place while she is on maternity leave, and enlists Dwight's support when she tries to show that Jim finds her replacement attractive. Meanwhile, Robert surprises Andy, Kevin, and Darryl when he asks to join their band. However, he soon brings in several professional musicians and kicks the original three members out, forcing them to happily play outside by the dumpster. Pam makes a discovery about Jim’s health amidst the execution of her plans with Dwight.
160	8	"Gettysburg"	Jeffrey Blitz	Robert Padnick	November 17, 2011	8008	5.50
Andy takes some of the office staff on a field trip to Gettysburg for inspiration. After most of the office abandons him, Darryl and Jim confront Andy and tell him that he should stop trying so hard to impress his coworkers. Meanwhile, Gabe finds himself enjoying the trip when he is mistaken as an Abraham Lincoln impersonator. Robert tasks the remaining employees with coming up with a new business idea for Dunder Mifflin and becomes convinced that Kevin's simple ideas are elaborate metaphors.
161	9	"Mrs. California"	Charlie Grandy	Dan Greaney	December 1, 2011	8009	5.71
Robert tries to get Andy to not give his wife, Susan (Maura Tierney), a job in the office. After a confusing interview, Andy relents and gives Susan a job, and California is furious. After Susan learns the truth, she and California have a major fight. Meanwhile, Dwight opens a gym in the building and makes Darryl join in hopes of getting other office members to follow.
162	10	"Christmas Wishes"	Ed Helms	Mindy Kaling	December 8, 2011	8010	5.79
Andy attempts to make everyone's Christmas wishes come true. Erin, upset about her unrequited feelings for Andy, drinks too much at the Christmas party and is escorted home by California. Meanwhile, Dwight and Jim are ordered to stop pranking one another, lest they forfeit their Christmas bonuses. Thus, they try to frame each other.
163	11	"Trivia"	B. J. Novak	Steve Hely	January 12, 2012	8011	5.90
When Oscar Martinez (Oscar Nunez) joins a trivia contest, Andy gets the entire office involved. Eventually, the team made up of Kevin, Erin, Kelly, and Meredith wins. Meanwhile, Dwight goes to Sabre headquarters to petition California to give him a job as a regional manager. California tries to get out of meeting with him, but eventually declines Dwight's request.
164	12	"Pool Party"	Charles McDougall	Owen Ellickson	January 19, 2012	8012	6.02
When Robert decides to sell his mansion due to his divorce, Kevin suggests that he throw an office pool party, where Erin attempts to make Andy jealous by flirting with Dwight. Robert gives everyone a tour of his massive home, which increasingly makes everyone feel uncomfortable.
165	13	"Jury Duty"	Eric Appel	Aaron Shure	February 2, 2012	8013	5.31
After Jim fakes having jury duty to spend time with Pam and their newborn child, Dwight suspects something is awry and tries to trip Jim up with an investigation. Jim, worrying that he will get into trouble, confides in Andy, who understands and tries to help cover up the incident. Meanwhile, Angela gives birth to her son, whom Dwight believes is his son.
166	14	"Special Project"	David Rogers	Amelie Gillette	February 9, 2012	8014	5.19
Just as Pam's maternity leave ends, Dwight and Andy must select employees to accompany Dwight to Tallahassee, Florida, after he is sent on an assignment by corporate.
167	15	"Tallahassee"	Matt Sohn	Daniel Chun	February 16, 2012	8015	4.38
Dwight and his group journeys to Tallahassee to meet with the President of Sabre's special projects, Nellie Bertram (Catherine Tate). The group discovers that Todd Packer (David Koechner) is participating in the same project, much to Jim and Dwight's chagrin. Although Dwight tries to impress his new boss, he has an emergency appendectomy. Andy fills in for Erin, and surprisingly enjoys himself.
168	16	"After Hours"	Brian Baumgartner	Halsted Sullivan & Warren Lieberstein	February 23, 2012	8016	5.02
Dwight and Packer compete to be in charge of the Sabre store by trying to romantically woo Nellie. Cathy bothers Jim in his room and tries to seduce him, only to be foiled with help from Dwight. In Scranton, Andy has everyone stay late to cover for their co-workers in Florida.
169	17	"Test the Store"	Brent Forrester	Mindy Kaling	March 1, 2012	8017	4.95
At the Sabre store opening, Dwight attempts to put on a theatrical presentation to impress Nellie. After a shaky start, an impromptu speech—originally supposed to be delivered by Ryan Howard (B. J. Novak)—given by Jim impresses the critical crowd. Andy is embarrassed after receiving a black eye, courtesy of a little girl.
170	18	"Last Day in Florida"	Matt Sohn	Robert Padnick	March 8, 2012	8018	4.89
When California reveals he hates Nellie's business plan, Jim swings into action to keep Dwight from getting fired. Jim eventually delays Dwight long enough, and Packer—who takes Dwight's place at the meeting with California—is fired instead of Dwight. Andy learns that Erin is not going to return to Scranton.
171	19	"Get the Girl"	Rainn Wilson	Charlie Grandy	March 15, 2012	8019	4.87
Andy drives to Florida to try to win back Erin. Nellie revisits the Scranton branch and takes over as regional manager, assuming that because the manager seat is vacant, she can have it. This usurping divides the office into pro-Andy and pro-Nellie factions.
172	20	"Welcome Party"	Ed Helms	Steve Hely	April 12, 2012	8020	4.39
California forces the office to prepare a welcome party for Nellie, but the party planners seek to sabotage it. Soon, Jim and Dwight learn tragic information about Nellie that makes them think twice about pranking her. Meanwhile, Erin helps Andy break up with his current girlfriend Jessica (Eleanor Seigler).
173	21	"Angry Andy"	Claire Scanlon	Justin Spitzer	April 19, 2012	8021	4.35
Andy returns to the office to find Nellie in the manager's chair. Andy soon overreacts by punching a hole in a wall and is promptly fired. Meanwhile, Kelly Kapoor (Mindy Kaling) is forced to choose between Ryan and a new man, Ravi (Sendhil Ramamurthy), who is Pam and Jim's pediatrician.
174	22	"Fundraiser"	David Rogers	Owen Ellickson	April 26, 2012	8022	4.17
Newly fired Andy goes to a fundraiser held by Angela's husband Robert Lipton (Jack Coleman) and returns with 12 dogs. Dwight, who wants to win the entire auction, discovers that the winners must lose money. Nellie tries to bond with Darryl and he teaches her how to properly eat a taco.
175	23	"Turf War"	Daniel Chun	Warren Lieberstein & Halsted Sullivan	May 3, 2012	8023	4.44
While drunk, Robert shuts down Dunder Mifflin's Binghamton branch. Andy prepares to make his comeback by temporarily forming his own rival paper company. Jim and Dwight work together to defeat a rival Dunder Mifflin salesman (Chris Bauer) who wants the Binghamton branch's clients.
176	24	"Free Family Portrait Studio"	B. J. Novak	B. J. Novak	May 10, 2012	8024	4.49
Dwight offers free family portraits in an elaborate scheme to obtain the DNA of Angela's child. After he steals a diaper, Angela pursues him in a high-speed car chase. After former CFO of Dunder Mifflin David Wallace (Andy Buckley) buys back the company, he re-installs Andy as manager and donates several million dollars to a mentor program California will join. California promptly leaves the office for good.

== Home media release ==
The eighth season of The Office was released by Universal Studios Home Entertainment as a five-disc set on both Region 1 DVD and a Region A Blu-ray on September 4, 2012; a two-part Region 2 DVD release followed on February 13 and August 8, 2013. The set contains all 24 episodes of the season presented in a 1.78:1 widescreen aspect ratio with Dolby Digital audio and optional English and Spanish subtitles. The release also includes a variety of deleted scenes, "Producer's Cuts" of the episodes "Angry Andy" and "Fundraiser", "The Girl Next Door" webisodes, a blooper reel, and promos created for Super Bowl XLVI.

== Explanatory notes ==
^i Information on individual episode ratings can be found in the "Episodes" section.
