= Fundraiser (The Office) =

- The Office episode
- Episode no.: Season 8 Episode 22
- Directed by: David Rogers
- Written by: Owen Ellickson
- Cinematography by: Matt Sohn
- Editing by: David Rogers
- Production code: 822
- Original air date: April 26, 2012

Guest appearances
- Jack Coleman as Robert Lipton; Andy Buckley as David Wallace; Elizabeth Penn Payne; Andrew Secunda as a volunteer

Episode chronology
← Previous "Angry Andy"	Next → "Turf War"
- The Office (American season 8)

"Fundraiser" is the twenty-second episode of the eighth season of the American comedy television series The Office and the show's 174th episode overall. The episode originally aired on NBC in the United States on April 26, 2012. "Fundraiser" was written by Owen Ellickson and directed by David Rogers. The episode guest stars Andy Buckley and Jack Coleman.

The series—presented as if it were a real documentary—depicts the everyday lives of office employees in the Scranton, Pennsylvania, branch of the fictional Dunder Mifflin Paper Company. In this episode, Andy Bernard (Ed Helms) crashes a fundraiser and ends up adopting twelve dogs. Dwight Schrute (Rainn Wilson) learns that an auction winner loses money. Nellie (Catherine Tate) learns how to eat a taco.

"Fundraiser" received mixed reviews from critics. According to Nielsen Media Research, "Fundraiser" was viewed by an estimated 4.17 million viewers and received a 2.1 rating/6% share among adults between the ages of 18 and 49, making it the lowest-rated season eight episode of The Office to air. The episode ranked third in its timeslot and was also the highest-rated NBC series of the night.

== Synopsis ==
Angela Lipton's husband Robert throws a silent auction fundraiser for local animal rights activists and Robert California buys two tables to seat everyone in the office. Newly fired Andy Bernard arrives and tries to get into an argument with Robert, telling him about a rock opera he has written with the hero based on Andy and the villain being a heartless character who wants to destroy all music named Thomas Oregon (with the name being a thinly veiled reference to Robert California), who is "humanized" when he pees himself at the end. Andy runs into David Wallace, former CFO of Dunder Mifflin, and begins plotting his return to Dunder Mifflin. Andy interrupts Robert's speech introducing the senator by volunteering to adopt the twelve dogs brought by the local animal society. Afterwards, members of the office ask if he is having a breakdown, and, at Kevin Malone's urging, Andy sadly agrees that he is.

Dwight Schrute attends without understanding how silent auctions work: he believes that the purpose of the function is to guess correctly the market price of the objects. By the end of the night, Dwight has put exorbitant amounts on the items and ends up accidentally donating over $34,000. He flees when he discovers his mistake, giving a bizarre speech on the value of animals before doing so. Nellie Bertram tries to talk with Darryl Philbin by complaining about the food. She suggests they get a taco at her expense, offering $30 to Darryl to go out and buy some. When she does, she shovels the ingredients in her mouth, not eating the shell. Darryl realizes she has no idea what a taco is, but appreciates that "she's trying" to socialize with her employees.

Oscar Martinez talks briefly to Senator Lipton about animal rights, and Lipton (who Oscar suspects is gay) gives Oscar his private cell phone number, asking Oscar to call him in the evening to discuss issues further. Oscar tells Pam and Jim Halpert that the Senator was hitting on him. Jim says Lipton was likely just schmoozing a voter, talks to Lipton himself, and also gets his number. Meredith Palmer later gets Lipton's number as well, resulting in Oscar thinking that the senator may not have been hitting on him. When Oscar is leaving, Lipton shakes his hand and caresses Oscar's arm for long enough that Oscar once again believes Lipton was pursuing him.

== Production ==
"Fundraiser" was written by Owen Ellickson and directed by David Rogers. The episode features the return of the character David Wallace (Andy Buckley), former CFO of Dunder Mifflin. Wallace, who is also attending the fundraiser, reveals to Andy that after his firing, he sold his toy-vacuum invention "Suck It" to the military for $20 million.

== Cultural references ==
The cold opening references several notable bands and musicians: the scene consists of Ryan complaining because he recently heard—erroneously—that musician Smokey Robinson died. Initially, Ryan refers to him as only "Smokey", which causes Pam to believe he is talking about Smokey the Bear. However, Ryan, on the bequest of Pam, is only able to name one song that Robinson had sung, "The Tracks of My Tears". Pam, however, is later able to remember that he sang "Tears of a Clown", and Jim references "I Second That Emotion". After Jim proves that Robinson is both still alive and playing at a local venue, Ryan tells him that he will be unable to attend because the opening band is Paul Anka, and that is "not what Smokey would have… does want!" During his pontificating rant, Ryan mentions that popular music is not all about "Jason Mraz and The Beatles", which shocks Dwight. Dwight lists off "Eleanor Rigby" and "Paperback Writer" and asks Ryan if he truly does not like those songs.

== Reception ==
=== Ratings ===
"Fundraiser" originally aired on NBC in the United States on April 26, 2012. The episode was viewed by an estimated 4.17 million viewers and received a 2.1 rating/6% share among adults between the ages of 18 and 49. This means that it was seen by 2.1% of all 18- to 49-year-olds, and 6% of all 18- to 49-year-olds watching television at the time of the broadcast. The episode finished third in its time slot, being beaten by Grey's Anatomy which received a 3.2 rating/8% share and the CBS drama Person of Interest which received a 2.4 rating/6% share in the 18–49 demographic. The episode beat the Fox series Touch and The CW drama series The Secret Circle. Despite this, "Fundraiser" was the highest-rated NBC television episode of the night. The episode was the 25th most watched episode in the 18–49 demographic for the week ending April 29.

=== Reviews ===
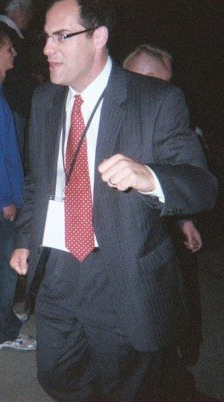
Several reviews wrote positively about the return cameo of Andy Buckley.

The episode received mixed reviews from critics, with critiques ranging from largely positive to very negative. Myles McNutt from The A.V. Club gave the episode a slightly positive review and gave it a B− rating. He wrote, "The Office is far from a profound show when it just throws its characters in a room and observes their behavior, but there’s a certain charm to it." McNutt noted that, despite feeling that the episode's description of "Darryl teaches Nellie how to eat a taco" was a poor move on NBC's part, he thought they "could have spent more time with Nellie learning how to eat a taco." Craig McQuinn from The Faster Times wrote positively of the episode, noting, "For the first time in forever this is an episode of The Office that actually has a lot going on. Whether the stuff that’s happening is actually meaningful or significant in any way is up for debate, but I actually enjoyed most of this episode."

Not all reviews were positive. Dan Forcella from TV Fanatics gave the episode a mixed review and awarded it two-and-a-half stars out of five. Forcella noted "It has been four episodes now since the super team returned from Florida, and The Office still hasn't found its footing back in Scranton", and he called the outing "another lackluster effort". A review from CliqueClack was largely critical of the episode, calling it "worse than usual" and noting that the show had finally hit "rock bottom". WhatCulture! reviewer Joseph Kratzer felt that the episode's setting—outside of the office building—was detrimental to the episode. He wrote, "The thing is, I in no way felt like any of what occurred in 'Fundraiser' needed to take place outside the Scranton branch and that’s really why a sitcom should move locations for an episode – because the story couldn't function without it. But this time it just felt like a cheap way to liven up a clearly very boring, uninspired, weak episode of television." Screen Crave wrote, "Those viewers of The Office that have scolded the show throughout the season for its varying degrees of sucking, are not likely to be changing their thinking after watching the latest episode."

However, many reviews were happy about the return of Andy Buckley, who portrayed David Wallace. A review from TV Equals noted that "I’m not totally convinced that David Wallace’s story is as simple as the one he tells, but maybe that’s just because I’d love any excuse for him to work his way back into the story lines for The Office." Michael Tedder from Vulture called Wallace's character "always-welcome".
