= Pam's Replacement =

- The Office episode
- Episode no.: Season 8 Episode 7
- Directed by: Matt Sohn
- Written by: Allison Silverman
- Cinematography by: Sarah Levy
- Editing by: David Rogers
- Production code: 807
- Original air date: November 10, 2011

Guest appearances
- Lindsey Broad as Cathy Simms

Episode chronology
← Previous "Doomsday"	Next → "Gettysburg"
- The Office (American season 8)

"Pam's Replacement" is the seventh episode of the eighth season of the American comedy television series The Office, and the show's 159th episode overall. The episode aired on NBC in the United States on November 10, 2011. It was written by Allison Silverman and was directed by Matt Sohn. The episode guest stars Lindsey Broad as Cathy Simms, who played a recurring role throughout the eighth season.

The series—presented as if it were a real documentary—depicts the everyday lives of office employees in the Scranton, Pennsylvania, branch of the fictional Dunder Mifflin Paper Company. In the episode, Pam Halpert (Jenna Fischer) trains an attractive temporary worker (Lindsey Broad) to take her place while she is on maternity leave, and enlists Dwight Schrute's (Rainn Wilson) support when she tries to show that Jim Halpert (John Krasinski) finds her replacement attractive. Meanwhile, Robert California (James Spader) surprises Andy Bernard (Ed Helms), Kevin Malone (Brian Baumgartner), and Darryl Philbin (Craig Robinson) when he requests to join their band.

"Pam's Replacement" relates to Pam's pregnancy; Fischer was actually pregnant and her pregnancy was written into the series with Pam and Jim having their second baby. The episode received mixed reviews from critics. According to Nielsen Media Research, the episode received 5.96 million viewers and received a 3.0 rating/7% share among adults between the ages of 18 and 49 marking a slight drop in the ratings from the previous episode, "Doomsday".

== Synopsis ==
Pam Halpert trains a temporary worker Cathy Simms so that she can take her place when she goes on maternity leave. In the break room, the other workers discuss how attractive Cathy is and how excited they are to have her in the office. Pam, being well into her pregnancy, is sensitive about her looks and so becomes offended by their discussion, albeit lightly and making a joke out of it. Most of them respond by assuring Pam that she is, if anything, more sexually attractive than before she was pregnant. Dwight Schrute, however, argues that sexual attractiveness is a mostly objective quality and pregnant women cannot be sexually attractive, and accuses the others of lying to spare Pam's feelings. Troubled by Dwight's comments, Pam asks her husband Jim Halpert if he finds the new temp attractive. Not wanting to upset his wife, Jim tells her that he does not find her replacement attractive, even objectively. Though Jim gives no sign of unease, Pam is convinced that he is lying to her, and enlists the help of the harshly honest Dwight to prove it.

After a number of unsuccessful attempts to trick Jim into revealing he finds Pam's replacement attractive, some of which involve a psychological "matchmaking test" (seeing who Jim would set Cathy up with) recommended by Kelly Kapoor, and Dwight grabbing Jim's crotch, Dwight and Pam convince Jim to submit to a lie detection test in the form of a retail store's blood pressure tester. At the conclusion of the interview, Dwight triumphantly announces that he recorded hypertension when Jim said he does not find the new temp attractive, but as Jim continues to insist he is telling the truth Dwight admits that he recorded equal hypertension on every question, including Jim's name. Pam realizes that Jim has unusually high blood pressure, which his father also suffers from, and forgets about the issue in order to focus on her husband's health.

CEO Robert California surprises Andy Bernard, Kevin Malone, and Darryl Philbin when he asks to join their band after he finds them having a jam session in the warehouse. Soon thereafter, California's friends, skilled local musicians themselves, arrive to join in. Not having brought their own instruments, two of them take over Kevin's drums and Darryl's synthesizer, while Andy's acoustic guitar is drowned out by the newcomer's electric guitar. The three of them are thus relegated to playing percussion. Andy, Kevin and Darryl realize that they were ousted, thanks to warehouse worker Val, and after a failed attempt to try getting their original band roles back, they instead satisfyingly play "Baby, I Love Your Way" by Peter Frampton outside.

== Production ==
The episode was written by consulting producer Allison Silverman, her first writing credit for the series after joining the writing staff in the eighth season. It was directed by Matt Sohn, one of the series' cinematographers and camera operators, his third directing credit for the series. The episode features a guest appearance from Lindsey Broad, and her character was described as "Pam’s competent and likable pal," Cathy. She appeared in a recurring role in the eighth season. The episode also relates to Pam's pregnancy. Jenna Fischer was actually pregnant and her pregnancy was written into the series with Pam and Jim having their second baby. The man who played Robert's skilled drummer friend is Steve Moore, better known as "The Mad Drummer" for the viral video he featured in, "This drummer is at the wrong gig".

== Reception ==
=== Ratings ===
In its original American broadcast, "Pam's Replacement" was viewed by an estimated 5.96 million viewers and received a 3.0 rating/7% share among adults between the ages of 18 and 49. This means that it was seen by 3.0% of all 18- to 49-year-olds, and 7% of all 18- to 49-year-olds watching television at the time of the broadcast. This marked a two-tenths decrease in the ratings from the previous episode, "Doomsday". Despite this, however, the episode ranked second in its timeslot, beating Bones which received a 2.7 rating/7% share in the 18–49 demographic and Person of Interest which received a 2.0 rating/2% share, although both the latter two shows had more viewers. "Pam's Replacement" was defeated by Grey's Anatomy which received a 4.0 rating/10% share. Added with DVR viewers, who viewed the episode within seven days of the original broadcast, the episode received a 4.4 rating in the 18–49 demographic, adding a 1.4 rating to the original viewership. A repeat of the episode on January 5, 2012 drew 1.85 million and received a 0.7 rating/2% share among adults between the ages of 18 and 49, ranking third and last in its time slot.

=== Reviews ===
"Pam's Replacement" received generally mixed reviews from critics. HitFix writer Alan Sepinwall complimented the episode for staying true to the characters compared to the rest of the season, which he had criticized in an earlier review. He called the episode a "significant step up" albeit just "decent" in absolute terms. The A.V. Club reviewer Myles McNutt criticized the Andy–Kevin–Darryl subplot for its lack of continuity or any sort of punchlines. He was also critical of the Pam–Dwight plot for not staying true to the characters, and suggested that the writers needed to write the show as less of "a bland copy of itself". He called it one of the laziest half-hours of the show and gave it a C−. Cindy White of IGN said that the episode needed a stronger A-plot writing that the plots "felt like a meal made up of two tasty side dishes". She gave it a 7 out of 10. Hanna Lawrence of Hollywood.com praised the episode for being believable and for showing things that happen in real life. She also praised the Jim–Pam plot for showcasing the couple as not completely "perfect". She called the band subplot "weak".
