= Christmas Wishes (The Office) =

- The Office episode
- Episode no.: Season 8 Episode 10
- Directed by: Ed Helms
- Written by: Mindy Kaling
- Cinematography by: Matt Sohn
- Editing by: Claire Scanlon; David Rogers
- Production code: 810
- Original air date: December 8, 2011

Guest appearances
- Lindsey Broad as Cathy Simms; Ameenah Kaplan as Val Johnson; Mark Proksch as Nate Nickerson; Eleanor Seigler as Jessica

Episode chronology
← Previous "Mrs. California"	Next → "Trivia"
- The Office (American season 8)

"Christmas Wishes" is the tenth episode of the eighth season of the American comedy television series The Office, and the show's 162nd episode overall. The episode originally aired on NBC in the United States on December 8, 2011. It was written by executive producer Mindy Kaling and was directed by Ed Helms in his directorial debut. The episode guest starred Lindsey Broad, Ameenah Kaplan, and Eleanor Seigler.

The series—presented as if it were a real documentary—depicts the everyday lives of office employees in the Scranton, Pennsylvania, branch of the fictional Dunder Mifflin Paper Company. In this episode, Andy Bernard (Ed Helms) attempts to "make everyone's Christmas wishes come true", including those of a drunken Erin Hannon (Ellie Kemper). Meanwhile, Dwight Schrute (Rainn Wilson) and Jim Halpert (John Krasinski) are entangled in a prank war in which each tries to frame the other.

"Christmas Wishes" received mostly positive reviews from critics. According to Nielsen Media Research, "Christmas Wishes" drew 5.79 million viewers and received a 2.9 rating/8% share in the 18–49 demographic, staying even with the previous two episodes, "Gettysburg" and "Mrs. California." It ranked first in its timeslot, and was the highest ranked NBC series of the night.

== Synopsis ==
Andy Bernard attempts to "make everyone's Christmas wishes come true". At a conference meeting, he vows to keep his promise to make wishes and asks the office members to also be nice to his new girlfriend Jessica. An emotionally confused Erin Hannon tries to be nice to Jessica, but ends up drinking too much at the party. Kelly Kapoor does her part as a friend of Erin's by being mean to Jessica, by accusing her of flatulating in public. In a drunken stupor, Erin tells Andy that her Christmas wish is for Jessica to die. Offended, he tells her to get over their breakup before storming off.

Andy becomes concerned about Erin's behavior, not least because Robert California has revealed that his marriage is ending, greatly desires sex, and spends a good deal of the party hanging out with Erin and pressures her into drinking shots. When Andy has to drive a drunken Meredith Palmer home, he sees Erin getting into Robert's car and he follows them with a look of panic on his face. However, he covertly witnesses Robert being a gentleman and sending Erin off to her apartment with a hug and words of encouragement. Andy subsequently drives away with a wistful smile on his face.

Dwight Schrute and Jim Halpert's pranking has caused Cathy Simms to ask Andy to move her to a different desk. In turn, Andy orders Dwight and Jim to quit their childish behavior. He tells them that the next one to pull a prank will lose their Christmas bonus, and the target of the prank will get the prankster's share. Wanting to double their bonuses, both Dwight and Jim attempt to frame the other. Jim loudly releases his credit card information hoping Dwight will steal it and buy something ridiculous. However, Dwight orders a $200 bouquet of flowers for Pam Halpert. Dwight then puts a porcupine in his desk and blames Jim. However, Jim tricks Dwight into stating the porcupine's name (Henrietta), causing him to inadvertently reveal his intentions. Jim, in retaliation, defaces a picture of his daughter Cece, and blames Dwight. After Andy says such vandalism is grounds for termination, Jim admits he staged the crime. Acknowledging that his plan has backfired, Andy tells Jim that he will not touch their bonuses, and just wants their behavior to not interfere with their job performances. Jim assures him he will tell Dwight, but purposely neglects to do so. Dwight thus continues to pull pranks on himself, to Jim's amusement.

== Production ==
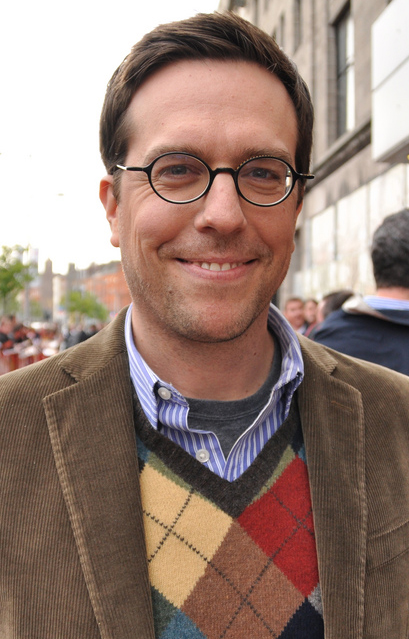
"Christmas Wishes" marked Ed Helms' directorial debut.

The episode was written by executive producer Mindy Kaling, who also portrays Kelly Kapoor on the series, her 24th writing credit for the series. This marks her first writing credit as an executive producer. Before this, it was speculated that she might not return to the series as a writer, before she confirmed that she would be writing the Christmas episode. She has also written the previous two Christmas episodes: "Secret Santa" and "Classy Christmas". The episode was directed by cast member Ed Helms, making his directorial debut. The episode also marks the fourth appearance of Lindsey Broad who plays Cathy, Pam's replacement during her maternity leave. She appeared in a recurring role for the season and she initially appeared in "Pam's Replacement". Due to Jenna Fischer's actual pregnancy, Pam did not appear in the episode. The Season Eight DVD contains a number of deleted scenes from this episode. Notable cut scenes include shoots of several of the staff members’ Christmas wishes being revealed, Dwight and Jim's pranks start turning on Cathy, and Meredith hitting on a newly single Robert.

== Cultural references ==
Midway through the party, Dwight enters the conference room and sets up his own speaker system to play "Christmas Eve/Sarajevo 12/24", a heavy metal medley of traditional Christmas songs performed by Savatage and the Trans-Siberian Orchestra. The song acts as a backdrop to a brief montage of various scenes of members of the office exchanging gifts while shots of Dwight, Nate, Creed, and Gabe air-guitaring along are interspersed.

== Reception ==
=== Ratings ===
"Christmas Wishes" originally aired on NBC in the United States on December 8, 2011. The episode was viewed by an estimated 5.79 million viewers and received a 2.9 rating/8% share among adults between the ages of 18 and 49. This means that it was seen by 2.9% of all 18- to 49-year-olds, and 8% of all 18- to 49-year-olds watching television at the time of the broadcast. The episode matched the ratings with the previous episode, "Mrs. California." Despite this, the episode ranked first in its timeslot, beating CBS drama Person of Interest which received a 2.8 rating/7% share in the 18–49 demographic, Fox drama series Bones which received a 2.4 rating/6% share, and ABC reality series America's Funniest Home Videos which received a 1.9 rating/5% share. Despite place third, all three of these shows received more total viewers than "Christmas Wishes". For the week of November 5 – December 11, 2011, "Christmas Wishes" placed twenty-third in the ratings among all prime-time broadcasts in the 18–49 demographic.

=== Reviews ===
"Christmas Wishes" received mostly positive reviews from critics. Hollywood.com writer Hannah Lawrence enjoyed the episode, writing, "as an episode, ['Christmas Wishes'] had that certain… 'spirit' that I enjoy from Office episodes." She also complimented the Erin-Andy relationship arc. IGN writer Cindy White, although noting that the episode "had some big obstacles to overcome" with the absences of both Michael Scott and Pam Halpert," concluded that the episode had a "high rewatch factor." She wrote, "If my Christmas wish was to watch an episode of The Office that made me laugh a lot, consider that wish granted." She ultimately gave the episode 8.0/10. M. Giant of Television Without Pity gave the episode a "B+". Margaret Lyons from New York wrote a mostly positively review, saying "'Christmas Wishes' filled me with holiday cheer, proving that there's still some juice left in this show," before noting that "There are still some issues left, too, though." What Culture! reviewer Joseph Kratzer praised Mindy Kaling and Ed Helms' writing and directing work, and said, "If this is what happens when cast members... take the reins then the writing and directing duties should be kept in house much more often."

The A.V. Club reviewer Myles McNutt wrote a slightly more critical review, noting the episode's lack of structure. He wrote that "['Christmas Wishes'] is not a terrible episode of television, but it's formless to the point where it avoids having to make any sort of statement." He did, however, positively comment on the Andy and Erin subplot and suggested that the episode was "positioned as a transition point," featuring an Andy-Erin-Jessica love triangle and a darker Robert California. He ultimately gave the episode a "B−". Many reviews considered "Christmas Wishes" to be the best episode of the first part of the season.
