= Mrs. California =

- The Office episode
- Episode no.: Season 8 Episode 9
- Directed by: Charlie Grandy
- Written by: Dan Greaney
- Cinematography by: Matt Sohn
- Editing by: Rick Weis
- Production code: 809
- Original air date: December 1, 2011
- Running time: 22 minutes

Guest appearances
- Maura Tierney as Susan California; Lindsey Broad as Cathy Simms

Episode chronology
← Previous "Gettysburg"	Next → "Christmas Wishes"
- The Office (American season 8)

"Mrs. California" is the ninth episode of the eighth season of the American comedy television series The Office, and the show's 161st episode overall. "Mrs. California" aired on NBC in the United States on December 1, 2011. The episode was written by consulting producer Dan Greaney, marking his first writing credit for the series, and was directed by Charlie Grandy.

The series—presented as if it were a real documentary—depicts the everyday lives of office employees in the Scranton, Pennsylvania, branch of the fictional Dunder Mifflin Paper Company. In the episode, Robert California (James Spader) brings his wife (Maura Tierney) into the office for a job, and tells Andy Bernard (Ed Helms) behind her back not to give her one. Meanwhile, Dwight Schrute (Rainn Wilson) opens a gym in the building and tries to get Darryl Philbin (Craig Robinson) to join it.

Tierney was brought in to play the role of California's wife because showrunner Paul Lieberstein stated that he was "a big fan of hers". "Mrs. California" received mixed responses from television critics. According to Nielsen Media Research, the episode received 5.74 million viewers and received a 2.9 rating/7% share among adults between the ages of 18 and 49, staying even with the ratings from the previous episode, "Gettysburg". The episode also ranked at first in its time slot.

== Synopsis ==
While Andy Bernard is having a meeting with Jim Halpert in his office, Robert California appears at the window and frantically says that his wife Susan is looking for a job in the office, and that Andy must not give her one. When Susan arrives, Andy compliantly tells her that they have no openings, but Robert insists that they have a look around before coming to any conclusions. Susan looks at the different departments, and decides on accounting. Andy again claims the office is already fully staffed, but Robert insists that he give her a job, even pressuring Andy by reminding him of his power as CEO. Confused by Robert's mixed messages, Andy relents and gives her a job, but Robert later calls Andy on the phone to berate him for hiring Susan. Andy asks everyone in the office to treat her poorly to drive her out, which makes everyone uncomfortable as they like her, but end up doing so nevertheless.

When Susan notices their behavior, she complains to Robert, who asks Andy to discuss the issues with Susan in the conference room and leaves. Susan eventually realizes it was Robert's idea to drive her away. When they call Robert out, he vehemently denies it. Andy tells them Jim also heard him say he did not want her working at the office, which Jim overhears, prompting him to flee the office, not wanting to be part of the drama. Robert finds out Jim has fled, and orders security to close the gate, preventing Jim from leaving. Jim then runs all over the building (at one point encountering Creed Bratton flying a toy helicopter on the roof), but Andy and Robert find him and take him back to the office. After trying unsuccessfully to deflect their questions about what Robert told Andy, Jim blurts out that he is baffled at Robert's attitude, since Jim enjoys working in the same place as his wife Pam Halpert and misses her while she is on maternity leave. Andy and Jim leave the conference room and after a short while, Robert and Susan leave. In the parking lot, Andy apologizes to Susan and after brief small talk, Susan asks Andy out on a date, leaving him surprised.

In the episode's b-plot, Dwight Schrute opens a gym in the building, which intrigues Darryl Philbin, who has been looking to lose weight. However, Dwight's gym is only filled with his farming equipment as exercising equipment. Darryl says he needs actual equipment, which Dwight finally gets, but sees that Darryl is barely using it, in part due to Dwight's insistence they focus on working the pelvic bowl. Dwight asks more employees to join to help motivate Darryl to exercise harder, getting only Gabe Lewis to join. During a bench-press, Dwight refuses to spot Darryl unless he says his motivation to work out. Darryl finally says it is to impress the new female warehouse worker Val, though Dwight believes he is referring to Val Kilmer.

== Production ==
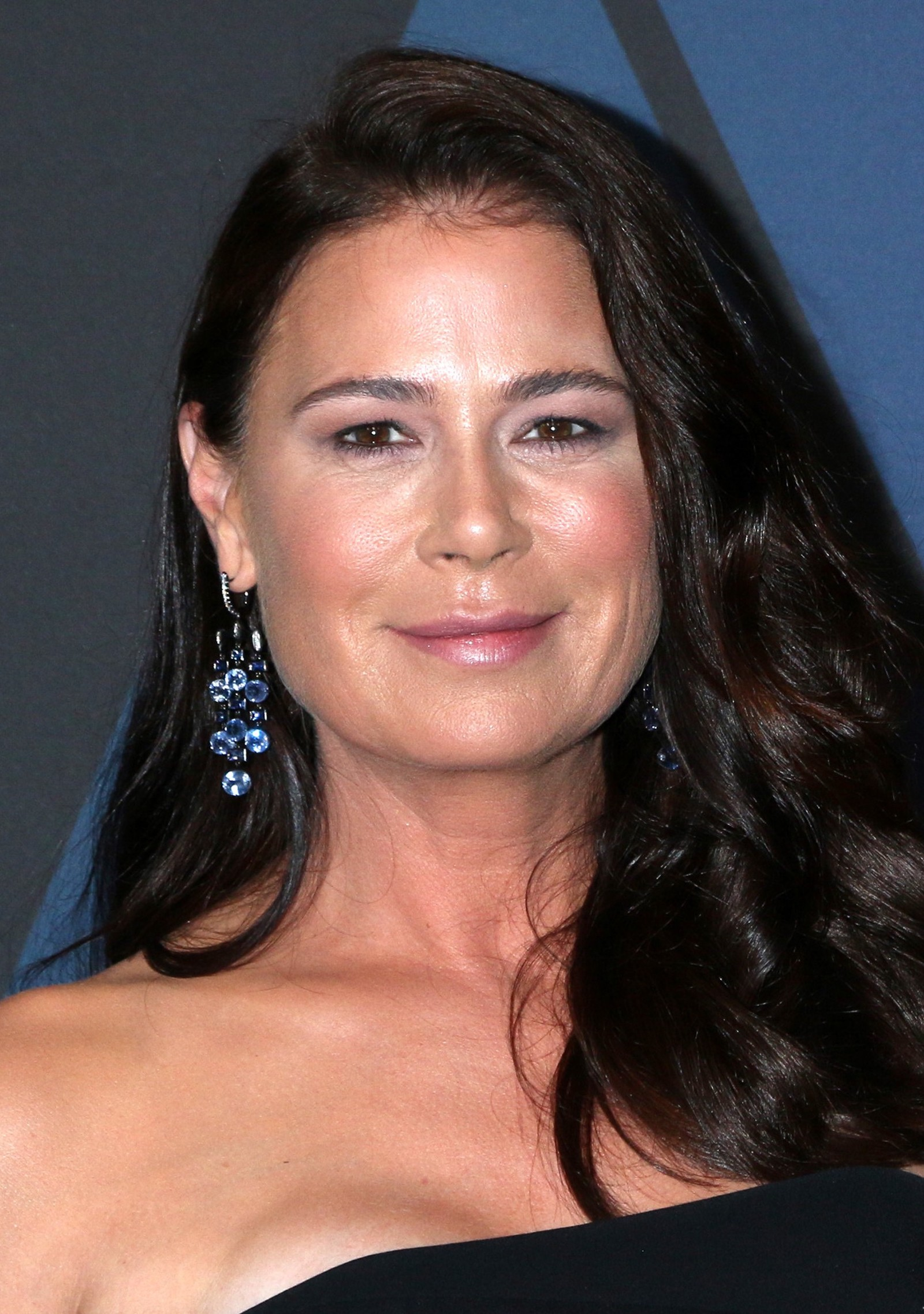
The episode guest starred Maura Tierney as Robert California's wife, Susan California.

"Mrs. California" was written by consulting producer Dan Greaney, his first writing credit for the series after joining the writing staff in the eighth season. Greaney had previously worked with executive producer Greg Daniels on The Simpsons. It was directed by co-executive producer and frequent Office writer Charlie Grandy, the first episode he has directed for the series after previously directing The Podcast webisodes. "Mrs. California" features a guest appearance from Maura Tierney, who played Robert California's wife, Susan California. Showrunner Paul Lieberstein stated that he was "a big fan of hers" and said he was excited for her guest appearance. The episode also marks the third appearance of Lindsey Broad who plays Cathy, Pam's replacement during her maternity leave. Due to Jenna Fischer's actual pregnancy Pam did not appear in the episode. The Season Eight DVD contains a number of deleted scenes from this episode. Notable cut scenes include more office workers joining Dwight's gym, Andy and Jim trying to get out of Mr. and Mrs. California's difficulties, and more scenes of Jim running away.

== Cultural references ==
Ryan mentions his desire to found the "Dream for a Wish Foundation," a play on the actual Make-A-Wish Foundation. During Dwight and Darryl's gym scenes, Darryl sardonically corrects Dwight by telling him that the pronunciation for LeBron James is actually "LeJon Brames." Later, Dwight attempts to get Darryl to stretch his pelvic bowl by telling him that The Fonz did it to become cool. Near the end of the episode, Darryl admits that he is attempting to impress Val from the warehouse, but Dwight believes he is talking about male actor Val Kilmer.

In addition, several films are mentioned or alluded to. Erin makes a reference to the 2006 film The Devil Wears Prada. Darryl comments that Dwight's gym looks like "a scene out of Saw V." Finally, Andy mentions that he "was watching a movie, and a bunch of apes took over San Francisco."

== Reception ==
=== Ratings ===
In its original American broadcast on December 2, 2011, "Mrs. California" was viewed by an estimated 5.74 million viewers and received a 2.9 rating share among adults between the ages of 18 and 49. This means that it was seen by 2.9% of all 18- to 49-year-olds, and 7% of all 18- to 49-year-olds watching television at the time of the broadcast. The episode stayed even with the ratings from the previous episode, "Gettysburg". Despite this, the episode ranked first in its timeslot, beating Bones which received a 2.8 rating/7% share in the 18–49 demographic, CMA Country Christmas which received a 2.2 rating/6% share, a rerun of Person of Interest which received a 1.6 rating/4% share and a rerun of The Secret Circle which received a 0.4 rating/1% share, although the former three shows received more total viewers. Added with DVR viewers, who viewed the episode within three days of the original broadcast, the episode received a 4.2 rating in the 18–49 demographic, adding a 1.3 rating to the original viewership. For the week of November 28 – December 4, 2011, "Mrs. California" placed nineteenth in the ratings among all prime-time broadcasts in the 18–49 demographic.

=== Reviews ===
"Mrs. California" received mixed responses from critics. The A.V. Club reviewer Myles McNutt said the episode had the possibility of being a great episode of The Office, but that it did not live up to that possibility. He suggested that the writers could tell jokes, but could not successfully "break a story anymore". He also called the subplot a mixed bag for featuring Dwight as a caricature of his former self, but complimented the character development for Darryl which started in "Lotto". He gave the episode a C+. Hannah Lawrence of Hollywood.com called the episode a large improvement over "Gettysburg" and also called it possibly her "favorite episode of the season so far". Chris Plante of New York called Robert California the worst part of The Office and said that he kept Andy from being more of a lead character for the series. TV Guide writer Bruce Fretts criticized the episode for under using guest star Maura Tierney. He also said that the episode suffered without former series star Steve Carell to serve as the comic foil. IGN writer Cindy White said the episode did not feel like The Office and called it "the exact opposite". Despite this, she went on to compliment Susan asking Andy on a date and the pairing of Darryl and Val as a couple, saying that the latter had possibilities. She ultimately gave the episode a 7.5/10. Joseph Kratzer from What Culture? gave the episode three out of five stars and wrote, "I'm going to go out on a bit of a limb here and say that while 'Mrs. California' was of course not a return to form for The Office, it was a good example of how the series might define itself in this new Michael-less era." M. Giant of Television Without Pity gave the episode a B+. After viewing "Mrs. California," Washington Post writer Hank Stuever named The Office one of the ten best TV shows of 2011 and said that the episode proved the series could still deliver cringe humor without Carell. Multiple critics complimented the cold open to the episode.
