= Free Family Portrait Studio =

- The Office episode
- Episode no.: Season 8 Episode 24
- Directed by: B. J. Novak
- Written by: B. J. Novak
- Cinematography by: Matt Sohn
- Editing by: David Rogers
- Production code: 824
- Original air date: May 10, 2012

Guest appearances
- Jack Coleman as Robert Lipton; Sendhil Ramamurthy as Ravi; Andy Buckley as David Wallace; Ameenah Kaplan as Val Johnson; Spencer Daniels as Jake Palmer; Mark Proksch as Nate Nickerson

Episode chronology
← Previous "Turf War"	Next → "New Guys"
- The Office (American season 8)

"Free Family Portrait Studio" is the twenty-fourth episode and season finale of the eighth season of the American comedy television series The Office, and the show's 176th episode overall. The episode originally aired on NBC on May 10, 2012. "Free Family Portrait Studio" was written and directed by B. J. Novak, who also wrote and directed the season premiere "The List". The episode guest stars Andy Buckley, Jack Coleman, Sendhil Ramamurthy, Jerry Minor, and Michael Schur.

The series—presented as if it were a real documentary—depicts the everyday lives of office employees in the Scranton, Pennsylvania, branch of the fictional Dunder Mifflin Paper Company. In the episode, David Wallace (Andy Buckley) helps Andy Bernard (Ed Helms) go undercover and stage a coup, and a new opportunity arises for Robert California (James Spader).

"Free Family Portrait Studio" received mixed reviews from critics, with many noting that the episode did not feel like a proper season finale. It was viewed by 4.49 million viewers and received a 2.3 rating/6% share among adults between the age of 18 and 49. The episode ranked third in its timeslot and was also the highest-rated NBC series of the night.

== Synopsis ==
Dwight Schrute sets up a free family portrait studio in the office, attracting a wide variety of office employees and their families. Participants include Creed with his extremely elderly parents, Toby with his daughter Sasha, Meredith with her son, Kelly with Ravi, Ryan holding desperate signs for Kelly, and Pam and Jim with their kids. Even Senator Robert Lipton arrives with Angela’s son, Philip. Jim suspects the portraits are a ploy by Dwight for revenge, but Dwight’s actual motive is to collect Philip’s DNA to confirm if he is the biological father. Angela tries to stop him, but Dwight manages to retrieve the diaper after a chaotic car chase and goes to the hospital to wait 72 hours for the results. Angela confronts him there, and the moment leads to a passionate kiss.

Meanwhile, Andy Bernard returns to the office in tattered clothes, pretending to have hit rock bottom to create a "delicious moment". Secretly, he has convinced former CFO David Wallace to buy Dunder Mifflin back from Sabre and reinstate him as regional manager. He spends the day staging humiliating situations, including spilling soup and acting unstable. Erin, who knows the truth, grows uneasy about the potential damage to Andy’s reputation. When David doesn’t show as planned, Andy’s coworkers assume he’s delusional. However, David finally appears, confirms the purchase, and reveals he used the $20 million he earned selling his toy vacuum “Suck-it” to the United States Military. Andy reclaims his role but is disappointed that no one cares about his big reveal because they’re distracted by the major ownership news.

Andy is eager to fire Nellie but is thrown off when she pleads for mercy with a Shakespearean monologue. He relents and gives her a new position. Robert California, now aware of Sabre’s collapse, announces his departure under the guise of helping underprivileged gymnasts in Eastern Europe and dramatically exits after kissing Andy and declaring, “It’s been a great year.”

Elsewhere, warehouse workers Calvin and Hide return, asking for their old jobs after losing money on a failed business venture. Darryl rehires them and shows them around. Val’s boyfriend, Brandon, grows jealous of Darryl’s compliments to Val, leading to an awkward confrontation. Later, Val joins Darryl and his daughter for a family photo, suggesting a romantic connection.

In the final scene, Robert Lipton flirts with Oscar, suggesting a deeper interest, leaving Oscar visibly surprised and intrigued.

== Production ==
"Free Family Portrait Studio" was written and directed by executive producer B. J. Novak, who also portrays Ryan Howard in the series, marking the last of his 15 writing and five directing credits for the series as Novak ended his day-to-day involvement with the series before Season 9 to work on "The Mindy Project". The episode features the third consecutive appearance of the character David Wallace (Andy Buckley), former CFO of Dunder Mifflin, the seventh appearance of Jack Coleman as Angela's husband, State Senator Robert Lipton, the second appearance of Sendhil Ramamurthy as Kelly's boyfriend Ravi, having previously appeared in the episode "Angry Andy", and the second appearance of former Saturday Night Live cast member Jerry Minor as Val's boyfriend Brandon, having previously appeared in the episode "After Hours". Former Office writer/producer Michael Schur appears as Dwight's cousin Mose for the 10th time, and the first since the episode "Garden Party" earlier in the season. James Spader, who portrayed Robert California, made his final appearance for the eighth season.

The Season Eight DVD contains a number of deleted scenes from this episode. Notable cut scenes include Robert complimenting Jim and Pam's marriage and admitting his desire to share in their love, which the two take as a metaphorical compliment, Jim receiving a text from Robert asking him if Pam and he are free at 10 the following Friday which causes the two to think that California literally wants to be a part of their relationship, Pam trying to reassure Jim that Robert's odd behavior is a figment of their imagination, and Robert calling off the get-together due to this resignation as CEO of Sabre. Jim, out of curiosity, asks him what he was planning, to which he replies "a three-way".

== Reception ==
=== Ratings ===
"Free Family Portrait Studio" originally aired on NBC in the United States on May 10, 2012. The episode was viewed by 4.49 million viewers and received a 2.3 rating/6% share among adults between the ages of 18 and 49. This means that it was seen by 2.3% of all 18- to 49-year-olds, and 7% of all 18- to 49-year-olds watching television at the time of the broadcast. The episode stayed even in the ratings from the previous episode, "Turf War". The episode finished third in its time slot, being beaten by Grey's Anatomy which received a 3.5 rating/10% share and the CBS drama Person of Interest which received a 2.6 rating/7% share in the 18–49 demographic. The episode beat the Fox series Touch and The CW drama series The Secret Circle. Despite this, "Free Family Portrait Studio" was the highest-rated NBC television episode of the night. 2.20 million viewers saw the episode through DVR, bringing the viewing total to 6.69 million viewers.

=== Reviews ===
"Free Family Portrait Studio" received mixed reviews from critics. Myles McNutt from The A.V. Club wrote that "Free Family Portrait Studio" proved to be "a disheartening conclusion to the show’s worst season, offering little optimism to sustain our already dwindling enthusiasm over the summer months." He continued to say that the season made him have little interest in "seeing anything further from Andy Bernard". Despite this, he complimented the Dwight subplot due to its slight connection to real human emotions. He ultimately gave the episode a C+. HitFix reviewer Alan Sepinwall wrote that he hoped the new showrunner, following Paul Lieberstein, would undo the developments made in the finale, criticizing the season's run of Andy Bernard as manager and Nellie Bertram's character. He also wrote that he would only view the first handful of episodes, due to the new showrunner and the hope that the season would improve. Cindy White of IGN wrote that the episode "hit all the marks" as a season finale, and said she was happy that Sabre was finally gone from the series. She complimented the good writing and character moments, but criticized the possible return of Nellie and the handling of the Angela-Dwight storyline over the season. She ultimately gave the episode an 8.0/10, calling it "great". Additionally, multiple critics criticized Andy's over-dramatization while trying to make a comeback to Dunder Mifflin.
