= Andrew Bernard =

American economist

- Born: June 20, 1963 (age 63)

Academic work
- Discipline: International economics
- Website: Information at IDEAS / RePEc

Andrew Barnes Bernard (born June 20, 1963) is an American economist, currently the Kadas T'90 Distinguished Professor at the Tuck School of Business at Dartmouth College in Hanover, New Hampshire, United States. He has been on the faculty at Tuck since 1999. He received his A.B. from Harvard and his Ph.D. from Stanford University in economics in 1991 and was on the faculty at MIT and Yale School of Management prior to coming to Tuck.

At the Tuck School, Bernard teaches electives focused on global issues facing firms. In 2017, Professor Bernard received the Tuck Teaching Excellence Award in MBA Core Curriculum and was the inaugural recipient of the Dean's Award for Mentoring. Professor Bernard presented the 2020 Ohlin Lecture at the Stockholm School of Economics in March 2022.

Bernard is an expert on firm and industry responses to globalization. He was one of the first academics to study how firms respond to globalization and has published papers on exporting, offshoring, outsourcing, and productivity. He has also examined the strategic response of U.S. and German firms to competition from low-cost countries such as China, transfer pricing decisions by US-based multinationals, and the effects of tariff and trade cost reductions on firm performance and productivity growth in the economy. In recent papers, he has documented the emergence of factory-less goods producers in the US, revisited traditional views of deindustrialization and explored the dynamics of new exporters and the role of intermediaries in global trade. His current research focuses on the evolution of global (and domestic) production networks and the consequences for firm performance. He received a grant from the National Science Foundation to support his work on firms and products in international trade.

Professor Bernard has been named as a highly cited researcher by Clarivate Analytics since 2014, was named by Thomson Reuters as one of the World's Most Influential Scientific Minds and is among the 100 most cited economists. In addition to being published in top academic journals such as the American Economic Review, the Journal of Political Economy, the Quarterly Journal of Economics and the Review of Economic Studies, his research has been featured on CNN, CNBC, Good Morning America, MSNBC, NPR's Morning Edition, the Marketplace Morning Report, the BBC, and in the New York Times, Wall Street Journal, Financial Times, the Economist, Nikkei, Fortune, and Business Week.

Bernard is a Research Associate for the National Bureau of Economic Research, the Centre for Economic Policy Research in London, Ifo Institute for Economic Research in Munich, and the Centre for Economic Performance at the London School of Economics. He has presented his research on the topic of firms and globalization at the IMF, the World Bank, the White House, the European Central Bank, and the European Commission.

The Office character Andy Bernard was named for Professor Bernard by the producer, Greg Daniels.
