= Search Committee =

- The Office episodes
- Episode nos.: Season 7 Episodes 25/26
- Directed by: Jeffrey Blitz
- Written by: Paul Lieberstein
- Cinematography by: Matt Sohn
- Editing by: Claire Scanlon; David Rogers
- Production code: 7025/7026
- Original air date: May 19, 2011
- Running time: 44 minutes

Guest appearances
- Part 1: Will Arnett as Fred Henry; Warren Buffett as an interviewee; Hugh Dane as Hank Tate; Cody Horn as Jordan Garfield; Ray Romano as Merv Bronte; Ricky Gervais as David Brent; James Spader as Robert California; Part 2: Kathy Bates as Jo Bennett; Will Arnett as Fred Henry; Jim Carrey as Finger Lakes Guy; Cody Horn as Jordan Garfield; Ray Romano as Merv Bronte; James Spader as Robert California; Catherine Tate as Nellie Bertram

Episode chronology
← Previous "Dwight K. Schrute, (Acting) Manager"	Next → "The List"
- The Office (American season 7)

"Search Committee" is the two-part finale of the seventh season of the American television comedy series The Office. It comprises the 151st and 152nd episodes of the series overall and the 25th and 26th episodes of the seventh season. It originally aired on NBC on May 19, 2011, in the United States. In the episode, Deangelo Vickers's replacement is sought out through a search committee process led by Jim Halpert (John Krasinski). Meanwhile, Angela Martin (Angela Kinsey) becomes engaged to her state senator boyfriend, Robert (Jack Coleman), while the rest of the office believes he is gay.

The episode was written by show runner and executive producer Paul Lieberstein and was directed by Jeffrey Blitz. The episode featured several guest appearances, including one from The Office co-creator Ricky Gervais, his second appearance on the series. The episode also marks the first appearances of Robert California and Nellie Bertram, the former of whom was a series regular in the eighth season while the latter had a recurring appearance in the eighth season and was a series regular in the ninth and final season.

"Search Committee" received mixed reviews from critics with multiple critics commenting on the multiple guest stars. According to Nielsen Media Research, "Search Committee" was viewed by an estimated 7.29 million viewers and earned a 3.9 rating/10% share in the 18–49 demographic, marking a rise in the ratings from the previous episode and the previous season finale.

== Synopsis ==
With Deangelo Vickers still in a coma, Dunder Mifflin–Sabre Scranton is left with Creed Bratton as interim regional manager. Jim Halpert, Toby Flenderson and Gabe Lewis interview candidates for the manager position, including Andy Bernard, Darryl Philbin, Kelly Kapoor, and a number of outsiders, including a personal friend of hers, Nellie Bertram. To stop Creed from calling clients and telling them the office is about to go out of business, Pam Halpert distracts him with activities, and poses as various clients when Creed has Jordan Garfield contact them.

Dwight Schrute, despondent over being demoted by Jo, stops taking care of himself and openly looks through want ads in the office. His attitude changes when applicant Robert California disparages the position and the office. Dwight becomes incensed that the position might go to someone who does not take it seriously. After Dwight's persistent efforts to acquire an interview, Jo instructs Jim to grant him one, as she likes "a little bit of crazy." Jim had earlier shot down Dwight's bribe for Jim's support, and quickly ends his formal interview.

Darryl thinks his relationships with Jo and Jim will make him a shoo-in, so he is caught off-guard when he actually must do an interview and submit a resume. Darryl writes up a four-page resume, which Jo derides, though Jim encourages Darryl by saying that the interview and resume are mere formalities for him. When Andy interviews for the manager position, Gabe attempts to sabotage him by asking random trivia questions, which Andy successfully answers, and Gabe ends up screaming at him. Gabe is also dismissive of Kelly during her interview, saying she is not a "serious candidate". Kelly exacts revenge by telling Jo about Gabe's relationship with Erin Hannon and his harassing behavior after their breakup. In response, Jo sends him back to Sabre's Florida headquarters and installs Kelly in Gabe's position on the search committee. Kelly then says she has accepted Dwight's bribery, and Toby says they could give Dwight another trial run.

After Phyllis Vance tells Jim that Kelly and Dwight have "pre-fired" her, Jim tells Dwight he is not and will not be the manager, and the office begins arguing about who will be selected. Jim cuts the discussion short and brings the committee back to the conference room to make up their minds.

Phyllis and Erin await to hear if Erin is the daughter previously given up by Phyllis in high school. The adoption agency informs Phyllis Erin is not her daughter, but Phyllis holds off on telling Erin after Andy rejects Erin's proposal to start dating again, and continues to show maternal affection toward her.

Angela becomes engaged to her state senator boyfriend, Robert. Oscar Martinez, who strongly believes that Robert is gay, shares his feelings with the rest of the office. They resolve not to tell Angela out of respect for her feelings, despite Angela's rude attitude about her forthcoming nuptials.

== Production ==
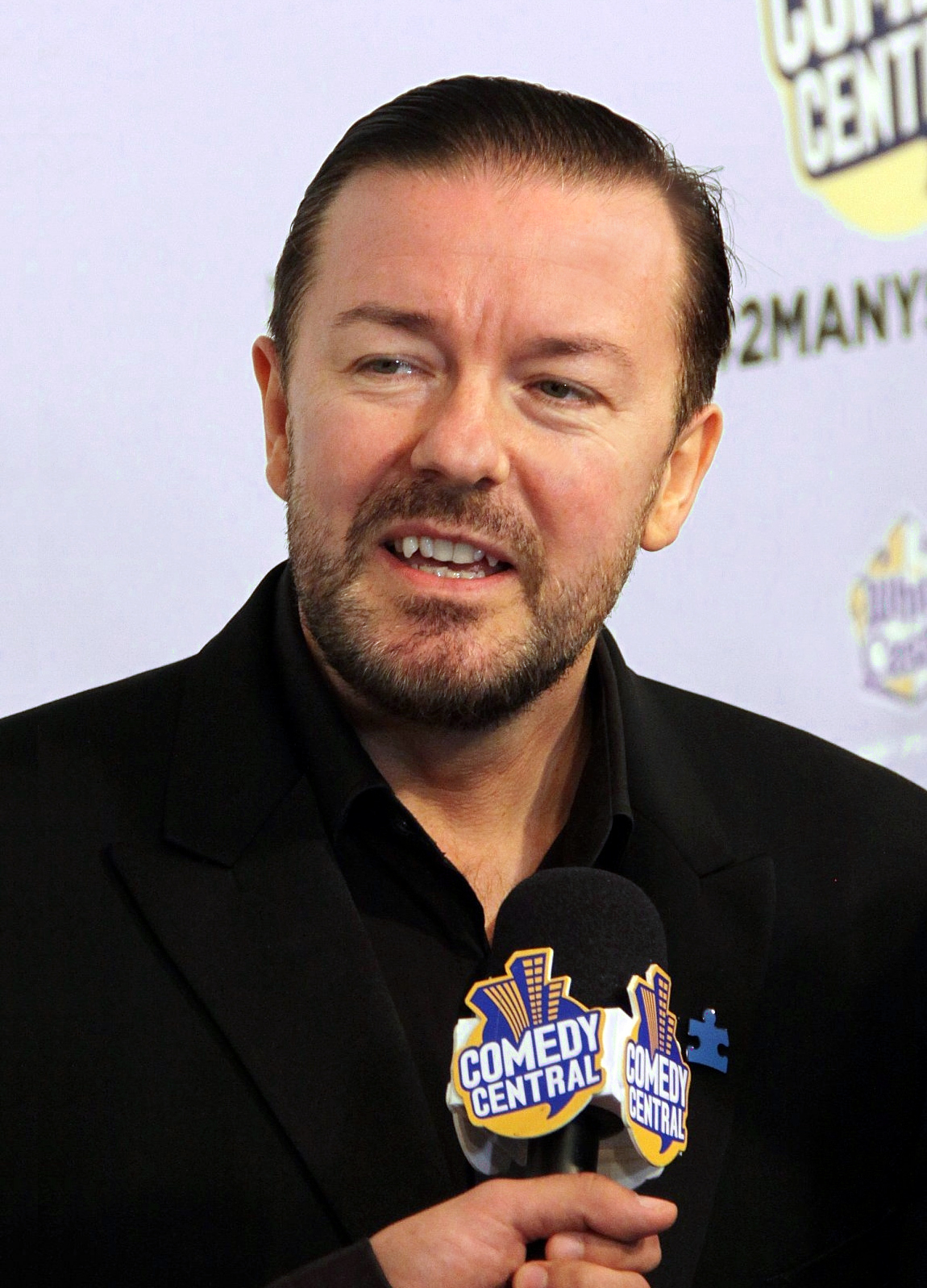
Ricky Gervais, co-creator of the British version of The Office, guest-starred and contributed to the script for "Search Committee"

"Search Committee" was written by showrunner and executive producer Paul Lieberstein, who also plays Toby Flenderson on the show, his 14th writing credit of the series. The episode was directed by Jeffrey Blitz, the ninth episode he has directed for the series. The episode features special guest appearances from Ricky Gervais (as his character David Brent from the original British version of The Office), Catherine Tate, Will Arnett, Ray Romano, James Spader, Jim Carrey, Cody Horn and Warren Buffett. Gervais previously appeared in the episode "The Seminar", and co-wrote the episodes "Pilot" and "The Convict"; he also serves as an executive producer for the series. In addition to appearing in "Search Committee", Gervais contributed to the episode script. Initially the guest stars were planned to be a secret, before all were revealed to the media. Lieberstein described the moments with the guest stars in the episode as "more than a montage. It's a number of scenes. We fit it in. We stuff it in".

The episode script was initially 75 pages long, 10 pages too long to stay within the episode's time slot; this led to several cuts, a common problem for episodes of the series according to writer, B. J. Novak. The script received several laughs from the cast and producers specifically for lines read by Creed Bratton and Kathy Bates. "Search Committee" was one of the first episodes not to feature former Office lead actor Steve Carell; the feeling during filming was "weird" according to Lieberstein. Carell's departure made it possible for more scenes with secondary characters, and also allowed for the "very long group scene", described as "observational and conversational" by Novak. The episode features a storyline hinted in "Goodbye, Michael" in which it is hinted that Phyllis is Erin's birth mother. The rumor was started during an interview with executive producer Greg Daniels with Entertainment Weekly in which he stated "A tiny mystery story – which I'm not sure anyone’s going to catch and will come out a few episodes from now – is being set up here".

The episode also marks the third and final appearance of Cody Horn as Jordan Garfield, Deangelo's executive assistant, and the first of three new roles since Carell's departure. The role was originally said to be recurring at first with a chance of her becoming a series regular in the eighth season. She did not return for the eighth season. Immediately after "Search Committee" first aired, NBC posted Andy, Dwight and Darryl's resume on their official website and allowed fans to vote for who they believed should be the manager. Spader would later join the cast as CEO of Sabre in the eighth season while Tate returned in the second half of the eighth season as romantic interest for Robert California. In the eighth-season premiere, "The List", Andy was revealed to be the new manager. Arnett was considered a high possibility to appear on the series, but could not due to his commitment to the NBC comedy series Up All Night. This also marks the eighth and final appearance of Kathy Bates as Jo Bennett. The opening episode of the eighth season would refer to Jo stepping down from her position as Sabre CEO and hiring Robert California to replace her.

== Cultural references ==
Darryl calls Microsoft and asks whether they still have Clippy, an unpopular feature from Microsoft Office. Phyllis mentions that many babies were born in 1982 due to the release of the 1981 comedy film Porky's. Ryan insults Pam, saying that she would prefer Rachael Ray or the hosts of The View as the new manager. At one point in the episode, Angela says "It's a little flashy. I mean, what am I, Naomi Judd?", a reference to the country music singer.

== Reception ==
=== Ratings ===
In its original American broadcast on May 19, 2011, "Search Committee" was viewed by an estimated 7.29 million viewers and received a 3.9 rating/10% share among adults between the ages of 18 and 49. This means that it was seen by 3.9% of all 18- to 49-year-olds, and 10% of all 18- to 49-year-olds watching television at the time of the broadcast. This marked a rise in the ratings from the previous episode, "Dwight K. Schrute, (Acting) Manager", and a rise from the sixth season finale, "Whistleblower". The episode became the highest rated scripted program on Thursday and ranked first in its timeslot, beating the season finales for Grey's Anatomy, Bones and The Mentalist. "Search Committee" was the seventh most-watched scripted show for the week of broadcast among adults aged 18–49.

=== Reviews ===
The episode received generally mixed reviews from critics. Myles McNutt from review website The A.V. Club gave the episode a B−, saying that it was "a funny episode that managed to be only fitfully satisfying." IGN reviewer Cindy White commented that "it's more apparent than ever that 'Goodbye, Michael' should have ended the season, if not the series," and that "the show is just spinning its wheels now". Despite this, she praised the scenes featuring Creed Bratton and James Spader, believing Bratton's performance consisted of "the funniest scenes of the episode", and that Spader "was given the meatiest part, gamely channeling his dominating boss role from Secretary". White ultimately gave the episode a 6.5/10, calling it "Okay". TV Squad writer Joel Keller criticized the episode for not featuring a true plot, writing that "this felt like a series of sketches in search of a plot." The Office co-creator Ricky Gervais also commented on the outlandishness, particularly Warren Buffett's appearance, saying "If you're going to jump a shark, jump a big one." He also compared the episode to the Chris Martin episode of Gervais's other series, Extras. The shark quote was repeated multiple times on other media outlets; Gervais eventually commented that "I fucking didn't [diss The Office], that's for sure."

Alan Sepinwall of HitFix referred to the episode as a "bumpy, awkward, great big mess of a finale" and a "very poorly-executed sweeps stunt". He also wrote that the guest stars "did not fit comfortably into the world of the show". Entertainment Weekly writer Hillary Busis called the episode a "major cop out" and criticized the writers for having a whole year to figure out how to end the season, but instead waiting to announce the new manager in the fall. She ultimately concluded that "I don't love some of the choices the show has made recently" and that "the show has just been spinning its wheels for the past several weeks". Many critics expressed relief that Erin and Phyllis were not mother and daughter. "Search Committee" was voted the fourth lowest-rated episode out of 24 from the seventh season, according to an episode poll at the fansite OfficeTally; the episode was rated 6.93 out of 10. In another poll, "Search Committee" was voted the thirteenth-highest rated episode out of 24 from the seventh season, according to a "Survivor" poll by OfficeTally. Jim Carrey later received a nomination for "Favorite TV Guest Star" at the 38th People's Choice Awards.
