= Erin Hannon =

Kelly Erin Hannon
- Ellie Kemper as Kelly Erin Hannon
- First appearance: "Michael Scott Paper Company" (2009)
- Last appearance: "Finale" (2013)
- Created by: Greg Daniels; Justin Spitzer
- Portrayed by: Ellie Kemper

In-universe information
- Occupation: Receptionist, Dunder Mifflin, Scranton, Pennsylvania; Receptionist, Dunder Mifflin Sabre, Scranton, Pennsylvania
- Family: Reed (foster brother); Martin Hannon (father); Fran Hannon (mother)
- Significant others: Pete Miller (boyfriend); Andy Bernard (ex-boyfriend); Gabe Lewis (ex-boyfriend)
- Nationality: American

Kelly Erin Hannon (born May 1, 1986) (Note: In "Search Committee", Phyllis indicates Erin was born the year the film Porky's came out. But Phyllis may be thinking of Porky's Revenge!. In "Couples Discount" Erin said she technically did not break up with her boyfriend when she was in first grade and that it is now their 20th anniversary. Assuming that her entrance into first grade was not delayed by her hospital stay from ages 3 to 6 (mentioned in "St. Patrick's Day") or by any of her other developmental struggles, that would make her age around 26, which indicates approximately 1986.) is a fictional character from the American comedy television series The Office, played by Ellie Kemper. She is the optimistic office receptionist for the Scranton branch of Dunder Mifflin, a position previously held by Pam Beesly before Pam quit to work for the Michael Scott Paper Company. She is a character original to the American version, and has no counterpart in the original British version of the series.

== Storylines ==
=== Season 5 ===
After Pam quits her job to work at the Michael Scott Paper Company, VP Charles Miner hires Erin as the new receptionist. The office refer to her by her middle name, Erin, to avoid confusion with Kelly Kapoor, with whom she becomes good friends. Dwight Schrute and Andy Bernard initially compete for her attention, but Dwight withdraws in acknowledgment of his new friendship with Andy. For the remainder of the season, Andy awkwardly flirts with Erin.

=== Season 6 ===
In "Murder", Andy asks her out on a real date while they are playing characters as a part of the Belles, Bourbon, and Bullets. Erin accepts, but is disappointed when Andy tells her later there was no real date and "just a part of the game". Andy later gets Erin as his Secret Santa, and gives her gifts based on "The 12 Days of Christmas". In "Manager and Salesman", Andy gives everyone in the office a card for Valentine's Day in order to mask his affection for Erin. Kelly believes Andy is in love with her, but Andy makes it clear that he does not love Kelly; Erin begins to realize that Andy has feelings for her. Andy and Erin ultimately begin dating; however, they keep their relationship a secret from their co-workers.

In "Secretary's Day", Andy plans the perfect Secretary's Day for Erin, including a lunch with Michael. During the lunch, Michael reveals Andy's prior year-long engagement with Angela, a fact which was previously concealed from Erin. Erin informs Andy that she needs some time alone from him.

=== Season 7 ===
In season 7, Erin begins dating Gabe Lewis much to Andy's chagrin. Erin discovers that Andy is performing in a local production of Sweeney Todd. In an effort to get Erin to attend, Andy pressures the entire office to watch, in order to spend time with Erin and win her back from Gabe. Erin shows up to the play and the two spend time together; however, Erin leaves to spend time with Gabe, which leaves Andy despondent.

Michael and Erin's relationship is explored in "Viewing Party", in which Erin invites the office staff to a party at Gabe's apartment. Erin attempts to get Michael to bond with Gabe, but Michael's insecurities over Gabe's position causes him to sabotage the party. Erin confronts Michael over his hostile feelings towards Gabe, and Michael angrily questions why she needs his approval. In an insightful moment, Michael realizes that Erin admires him and views him as a father figure.

In "Michael's Last Dundies", Erin starts to avoid Gabe at work, as she does not feel attracted to him anymore; Pam encourages her to tell Gabe to avoid leading him on. However, Pam also visibly bristles when Erin unwittingly insults her past relationships, and Jim makes a lame excuse to get out of the car where Erin has cornered Pam which he confirms is due to him not wanting to listen to Erin at all; this marked a point where Jim was blunt about being annoyed by Erin and was not willing to pretend otherwise. During the Dundie awards, Erin publicly breaks up with Gabe in front of the staff, which spurs Gabe to leave the award show. When Michael prepares to leave for Colorado, Erin has a heart-to-heart conversation with Michael about her love life, admitting that she might be in love with Andy. Michael dismisses both Gabe and Andy, instead advising her that the right guy will come along and she will know it.

Erin and Andy eventually begin hanging out together again, though Gabe continues with his attempts to win back Erin. In "Search Committee", after getting some advice from Phyllis, Erin tells Andy that she still has feelings for him. However, Andy denies her, still hurt from being dumped in favor of Gabe.

=== Season 8–9 ===
In season 8, Erin helps Andy out with his challenges of being manager and is the only one to congratulate him on his new job. During the staff Christmas party, Erin meets Jessica, Andy's girlfriend. Emotionally confused, Erin drinks too much at the party and reveals she still has feelings for Andy. She later gets a ride home from Robert California, who tells her to take some aspirin and get some rest.

Erin remains hopeful that Andy will end things with Jessica, though she comes to realize that this is not going to happen; unbeknownst to Erin, however, it becomes clear Andy still has feelings for her. When Erin gets assigned to Dwight's Sabre Store team in Tallahassee, she tells the camera that she is never returning to Scranton.

In "Get the Girl", Andy travels to Florida to try to win Erin back. Erin initially wants to stay, but the two get back together; Andy ends up breaking up with Jessica on the way back to Scranton. When Andy gets fired by Robert California (with Nellie taking over the manager position), Erin continues to support Andy.

In season 9, Andy returns from his Outward Bound program with a confident and cocky attitude, which surprises Erin. She ends up bonding with Pete Miller, a new customer service representative at the Scranton branch, and they continue to grow closer while Andy is away on his boat trip. Upon Andy's return, Erin breaks up with Andy and begins dating Pete. This is referenced in a scene in one of the series' final episodes that circles back to Jim's established dislike for Erin, as he and an equally unenthused Pam make more lame excuses to avoid an Erin-offered double date between the Halperts and her and Pete, and Erin silently registers her awareness that Jim and Pam don't want to socialize with her.

In the series finale, Erin reunites with her birth parents, who had seen the documentary and showed up at a Q&A forum with the office members. It is implied that she is still dating Pete, as they are shown dancing at Dwight and Angela's wedding.

== Behind the scenes ==
"Being on set with them is like being in a dream, except the dream is real and I can reach out and touch them. Except I am trying not to touch them too much, because I was raised right."

— Ellie Kemper, on The Office

Kemper described herself as a "huge fan" of the show and was excited to be cast. In an interview with The A.V. Club, Kemper revealed that she was initially slated to appear in only 4 episodes of the fifth season; however, her character was ultimately expanded, and Kemper was promoted as a main cast member for the sixth season. Kemper said her audition had a very different character, a sarcastic "straight man—grounded, sees through it all", more in line with the rest of the cast. Ultimately, she was rewritten to be what Kemper recognized as "an exaggerated version of myself", more perky and optimistic. The character was named after the show's writer's assistant, Kelly Hannon, who later wrote some digital shorts for the series. Writer Jennifer Celotta described Kemper as a "fun addition" to the show, writing "we think it's fun to see someone who truly enjoys being [in the office]." This positivity towards the job made Erin very popular with the writers, who started pitching storylines for her. One of those plots was her romance with Andy Bernard, with writer Brent Forrester explaining that the characters seemed compatible for "both being left-footed socially". Kemper herself did not think they were a good match because Andy was "too childish, he wasn't ready to take care of Erin the way she needed." Editor Claire Scanlon added that a particular turning point for Erin was "Secretary's Day", which highlighted how well the character played off Michael Scott.

== Reception ==
Critics and fans have commented on Kemper's addition to the show mostly positively. Joshua Ostroff of Eye Weekly described Erin as one of the best new television characters of the 2008–2009 season and said, "Erin’s high-grade adorability, up-for-anything attitude and sheer niceness is unlike anyone else in the office, adding a welcome new wrinkle for next season." Andy Shaw of TV Fodder said she "adds some freshness to the cast" and Josh McAuliffe of The Times-Tribune in Scranton, Pennsylvania, said he liked Erin's "cheerful, appealingly goofy personality".

Her performance was notably praised during the show's eighth season, where she was the highlight of the season for many critics. Myles McNutt noted that "regardless of how down I was on this or any other episode, Ellie Kemper really has been tremendous all season." In addition, Kemper's performance in the episodes "Spooked," "Christmas Wishes," "Pool Party," and "Special Project," in particular, were praised by critics.
