= Maura Tierney =

American actress (born 1965)

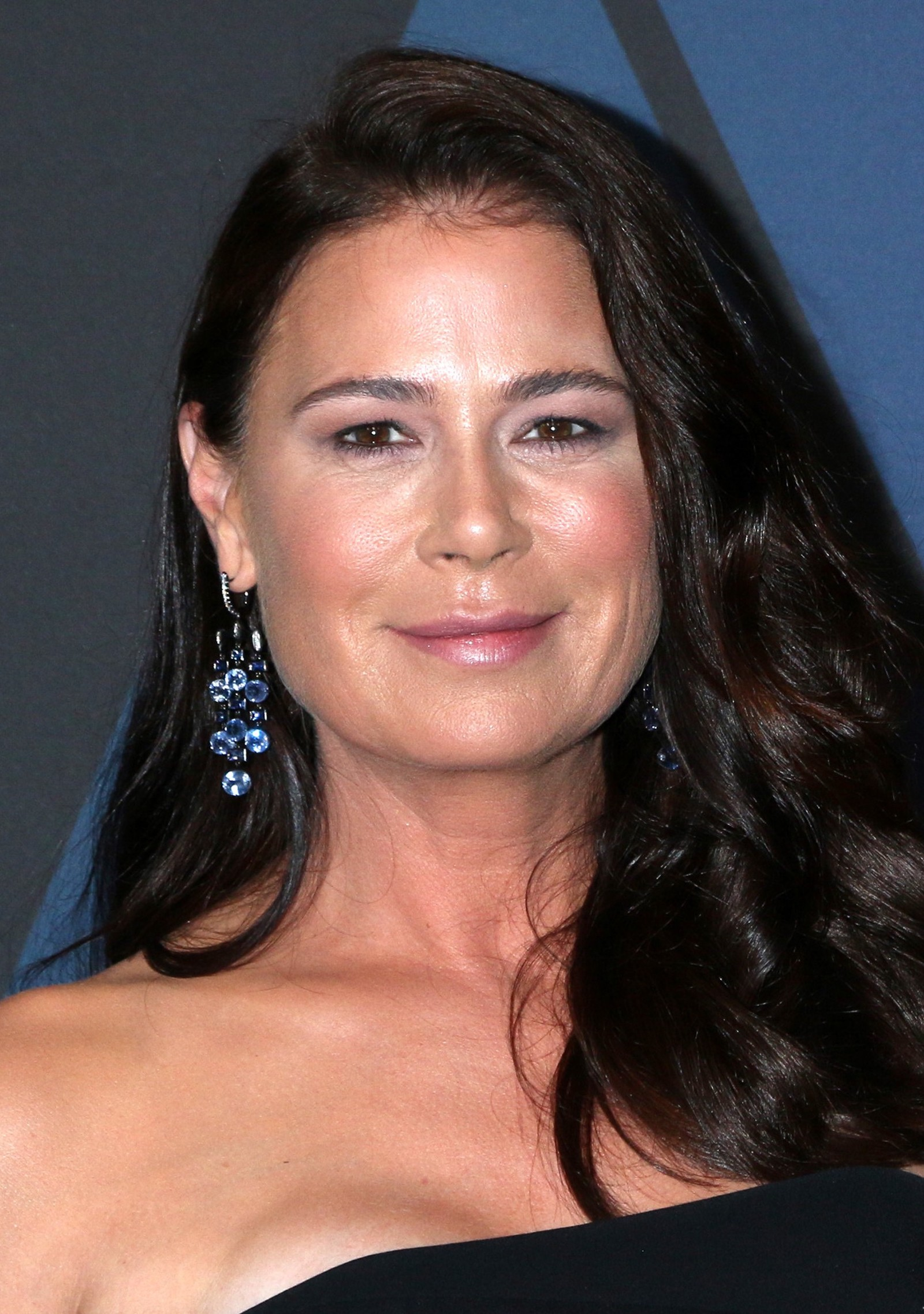
- Tierney in 2018
- Born: Maura Lynn Tierney; February 3, 1965 (age 61); Boston, Massachusetts, U.S.
- Education: New York University
- Occupation: Actress
- Years active: 1987–present
- Spouse: Billy Morrissette (m. 1993, divorced)
- Father: Joseph M. Tierney

Maura Lynn Tierney (born February 3, 1965) is an American actress. She is known for her roles as Lisa Miller on the sitcom NewsRadio (1995–1999), Abby Lockhart on the medical drama ER (1999–2009), and Helen Solloway on the mystery drama The Affair (2014–2019), the last of which won her a Golden Globe Award for Best Performance by an Actress in a Supporting Role in a Series, Limited Series or Motion Picture Made for Television.

Tierney has also appeared in films including Primal Fear (1996), Liar Liar (1997), Primary Colors (1998), Insomnia (2002), The Iron Claw (2023), and Twisters (2024).

== Early life ==
Tierney was born and raised in the Hyde Park neighborhood of Boston, the eldest of three children in an Irish American Catholic family. Her mother Pat (née James) is a real estate broker, while her father, Joseph M. Tierney, was a prominent Boston politician who served on the Boston City Council for 15 years.

Tierney attended Mount Alvernia Academy Elementary School and Notre Dame Academy in Hingham, Massachusetts, where she studied drama, which led to her appearance at the Boston Globe Drama Festival. After graduation, she attended New York University, where she majored first in dance and then graduated with a degree in drama.

== Career ==
After appearing in several plays, Tierney moved to Los Angeles in 1987, beginning with a role in Disney's made-for-TV film Student Exchange. Tierney's first starring role in a film was in a low-budget independent film called Dead Women in Lingerie, which was shot in 24 days.

Tierney had a number of small roles in film and television and a co-starring role in 704 Hauser, a short-lived 1994 spin-off of All in the Family. She first received regular national exposure with her leading role in the sitcom NewsRadio from 1995 to 1999. While part of the NewsRadio cast, she also starred in several successful films of the late 1990s and early 2000s such as Primal Fear, Liar Liar, Primary Colors, Forces of Nature and Welcome to Mooseport.

After NewsRadio was canceled, Tierney decided not to star in another sitcom:

[W]hen NewsRadio got canceled, (...) I thought, there's probably not gonna be something like [that show] again for me... So then, when ER called (...) that was a way to stay in [television] that would remain interesting for me.

From 1999 to 2008, Tierney played Nurse Abigail "Abby" Lockhart on ER, a character that began as a guest appearance in November 1999 and then expanded in February 2000 to a full-time regular role as an ER nurse and later after completion of medical school, a doctor. She was reunited with her NewsRadio co-star Khandi Alexander, who at that time also had a recurring role on ER. Within a year, Tierney's work on ER earned her an Emmy Award nomination, a recognition she credits to a "juicy" story arc featuring Sally Field as Lockhart's mother Maggie Wyczenski, who has bipolar disorder.

Tierney confirmed in April 2008 that she would be leaving ER shortly after the beginning of the show's fifteenth season. In October 2008, she made her final regular appearance on the series after nearly 10 seasons on the show. She returned to make a cameo appearance in one additional episode later in 2009 toward the end of the final season.

Tierney's highest-profile film while on ER was the 2002 film Insomnia, which was directed by Christopher Nolan. That same year, she also starred in Scotland, Pa. where she portrayed a Lady Macbeth–like character written specifically for her by Billy Morrissette, her husband at the time. She was praised by critics for her performance. She also collaborated with NewsRadio writer Joe Furey for a special "Working with Joe Furey" featurette for Furey's film Love and Support.

In 2004, Tierney won the second-season tournament of Celebrity Poker Showdown against Lauren Graham, who had a guest role in the fourth season of NewsRadio. Tierney returned to the stage in May 2006 in an appearance opposite Eric McCormack in the Off-Broadway premiere of Some Girl(s). She also appeared in the 2008 films Semi-Pro, Baby Mama, The Go-Getter and Finding Amanda. Tierney also played the role of Laurel in the Off-Broadway play Three Changes with Dylan McDermott from September 16 to October 4, 2008.

Tierney returned to television, playing the recurring character Kelly McPhee on Rescue Me in 2009 and 2011 during its final season. She replaced Joely Richardson as the female lead of The Whole Truth after Richardson left to spend more time with her family. Tierney's role in the series, a legal drama produced by Jerry Bruckheimer, marked her return to television after recovering from breast surgery and cancer treatments. ABC canceled The Whole Truth after four episodes owing to low ratings.

In 2010, Tierney became a member of the New York City–based experimental theatre company The Wooster Group. She performed along with Frances McDormand in the Wooster Group's 2010 remounting of North Atlantic, directed by Elizabeth LeCompte. From 2016 to 2019, she played the feminist Germaine Greer in The Town Hall Affair, also directed by LeCompte. Tierney herself conceived the idea for this play, which recreates a raucous debate on Women's Liberation that Norman Mailer organized with prominent feminists in 1971.

In February 2011, Tierney made her debut at the Gate Theatre in the Dublin premiere of Yasmina Reza's God of Carnage (translation by Christopher Hampton) alongside Ardal O'Hanlon. Also in 2011, Tierney appeared in one episode of The Office as Robert California's wife.

In September 2012, Tierney began a recurring role on the legal drama The Good Wife, playing Maddie Hayward. The role included scenes with the show's lead character Alicia Florrick, as played by Julianna Margulies; the two actors had previously worked together on ER, Margulies like Tierney having previously played a lead character on that show. In 2013, Tierney joined the cast of The Affair, playing Helen Solloway, for which she won the Golden Globe Award in 2016.

In 2018, Tierney co-starred with Steve Carell and Timothée Chalamet in the dark family drama film Beautiful Boy, based on the memoir of the same name by David Sheff. In 2019, Tierney appeared in The Report as "an intense, driven, somewhat vengeful Counterterrorism expert determined to get behind any program that promises to get the intel that will stop another attack from happening." Also in 2019, Tierney originated the lead role of Elizabeth in the West Coast premiere of Jen Silverman's play Witch at the Geffen Playhouse, directed by Marti Lyons.

In March 2020, Tierney joined the cast of American Rust. In October 2020, Tierney joined the cast of Your Honor.

In 2023, she appeared in Sean Durkin's wrestling drama The Iron Claw. In 2024, she appeared in Lee Isaac Chung's Twisters, a sequel to the 1996 film Twister. That same year, Tierney joined the cast of Law & Order for season 24, portraying a new lieutenant replacing Camryn Manheim.

== Personal life ==
In 1992, Tierney met actor-director Billy Morrissette on the first day he arrived in Los Angeles. They married on February 1, 1993. Morrissette directed, and both he and Tierney appear in, the 2001 film Scotland, PA. The couple separated on March 7, 2006, and by that July, citing irreconcilable differences, she filed for divorce, which was later finalized.

On February 1, 2009, Tierney officiated at the wedding of her friend and former ER co-star Parminder Nagra to photographer James Stenson.

Tierney had surgery to remove a tumor from her breast in 2009. She had been cast in Parenthood but schedule conflicts with her cancer treatments led her to leave and she was replaced by Lauren Graham. Tierney finished treatment and returned to work in a stage play in 2010.

== Filmography ==
Key
†	Denotes works that have not yet been released

=== Film ===
Year	Title	Role	Notes
1991	Dead Women in Lingerie	Molly Field	
1991	The Linguini Incident	Cecelia	
1992	White Sands	Noreen	
1992	Fly by Night	Denise	
1993	The Temp	Sharon Derns	
1995	Mercy	Simonet	
1996	Primal Fear	Naomi Chance	
1997	Liar Liar	Audrey Reede	
1997	Broadway Brawler	—N/a	Unfinished film
1998	Primary Colors	Daisy Green	
1998	The Thin Pink Line	Suzanne	
1999	Forces of Nature	Bridget Cahill	
1999	Oxygen	Detective Madeline Foster	
1999	Instinct	Lynn Powell	
2000	Mexico City	Pam (voice)	
2001	Scotland, PA	Pat McBeth	Also producer
2002	Insomnia	Rachel Clement	
2002	Rooftop Kisses	Denise	Short film
2002	The Nazi	Helen	Short film
2003	Melvin Goes to Dinner	Leslie	
2004	Welcome to Mooseport	Sally Mannis	
2006	Danny Roane: First Time Director	Herself	
2006	Diggers	Gina	
2007	The Go-Getter	Pets	
2008	Semi-Pro	Lynn	
2008	Baby Mama	Caroline	
2008	Finding Amanda	Lorraine Mendon	
2012	Nature Calls	Janine	
2017	Anything	Laurette Sachman	
2018	Beautiful Boy	Karen	
2019	The Report	Bernadette	
2023	The Iron Claw	Doris Von Erich	
2024	Twisters	Cathy Carter	
2026	Descent †	Diedre Nickels	Short film

=== Television ===
Year	Title	Role	Notes
1987	Student Exchange	Kathy Maltby	Television film
1988	Crossing the Mob	Michelle	Television film
1988	The Van Dyke Show	Jillian Ryan	10 episodes
1989	Family Ties	Darlene	Episode: "My Best Friend's Girl"
1990	Booker	Donna Cofax	Episode: "Reunion"
1990	Flying Blind	Donna	Television film
1991	Law & Order	Patricia "Patti" Blaine	Episode: "Aria"
1994	Lifestories: Families in Crisis	—N/a	Episode: "A Body to Die For: The Aaron Henry Story"
1994	704 Hauser	Cherlyn Markowitz	Television miniseries
1994	Out of Darkness	Meg	Television film
1994	Roseanne	Kim	Episode: "Slepper"
1995–1999	NewsRadio	Lisa Miller	97 episodes
1999–2009	ER	Dr. Abby Lockhart	189 episodes
2000	King of the Hill	Tanya (voice)	Episode: "Movin' On Up"
2000	Sammy	Kathy Kelly (voice)	9 episodes
2009	Parenthood	Sarah Braverman	Unaired Television pilot; replaced by Lauren Graham
2009–2011	Rescue Me	Kelly McPhee	9 episodes
2010–2011	The Whole Truth	Kathryn Peale	13 episodes
2011	The Office	Susan California	Episode: "Mrs. California"
2012–2013	The Good Wife	Maddie Hayward	7 episodes
2012	Ruth & Erica	Erica	10 episodes
2014–2019	The Affair	Helen Solloway	53 episodes
2018	Electric Dreams	Irene Lee	Episode: "Safe & Sound"
2021	Your Honor	Fiona McKee	4 episodes
2021–2024	American Rust	Grace Poe	19 episodes
2024–present	Law & Order	Lieutenant Jessica Brady	Main role
2025–present	Law & Order: Special Victims Unit	Lieutenant Jessica Brady	2 episodes

== Theatre credits ==
Year	Title	Role	Venue
2006	Some Girl(s)	Bobbi	Lucille Lortel Theatre
2006	An Oak Tree	Father (replacement)	Barrow Street Theatre
2008	Three Changes	Laurel	Playwrights Horizons
2013	Lucky Guy	Alice McAlary	Broadhurst Theatre

== Awards and nominations ==
Year	Award	Category	Work	Result	Ref.
2000	Blockbuster Entertainment Awards	Favorite Supporting Actress – Comedy/Romance	Forces of Nature	Nominated	
2001	Screen Actors Guild Awards	Outstanding Performance by an Ensemble in a Drama Series	ER	Nominated	
2001	Primetime Emmy Awards	Outstanding Supporting Actress in a Drama Series	ER	Nominated	
2003	Satellite Awards	Best Actress in a Series, Drama	ER	Nominated	
2003	Phoenix Film Festival	Best Ensemble Acting	Melvin Goes to Dinner	Won	
2003	PRISM Awards	Performance in a Drama Series Multi-Episode Storyline	ER	Nominated	
2007	PRISM Awards	Performance in a Drama Series Episode	ER	Nominated	
2008	PRISM Awards	Performance in a Drama Series Multi-Episode Storyline	ER	Nominated	
2016	Golden Globe Awards	Best Performance by an Actress in a Supporting Role in a Series, Limited Series or Motion Picture Made for Television	The Affair	Won	
2016	Critics' Choice Awards	Best Supporting Actress in a Drama Series	The Affair	Nominated	
2016	Primetime Emmy Awards	Outstanding Supporting Actress in a Drama Series	The Affair	Nominated	
2016	Critics' Choice Awards	Best Supporting Actress in a Drama Series	The Affair	Nominated	
2017	Satellite Awards	Best Actress in a Supporting Role in a Series, Miniseries or Motion Picture Made for Television	The Affair	Nominated	
2019	Gracie Awards	Best Actress in a Supporting Role – Drama	The Affair	Won	
