= Robert California =

Fictional character from NBC's The Office

- The Office character
- James Spader as Robert California
- First appearance: "Search Committee" (2011)
- Last appearance: "Free Family Portrait Studio" (2012)
- Created by: Greg Daniels; Paul Lieberstein
- Portrayed by: James Spader

In-universe information
- Nicknames: "BK" “The Lizard King”
- Occupation: Regional manager of Dunder Mifflin (former); CEO of Sabre (former); CEO of Sabre/Dunder Mifflin (preceded By Jo Bennett, then succeeded by David Wallace)
- Family: Bert (son); Gretchen (sister)
- Spouse: Susan California (third ex-wife)
- Nationality: American

Robert California, also known as Bob Kazamakis, is a fictional character on the American comedy television series The Office, portrayed by James Spader. In the eighth season, Robert managed to persuade Jo Bennett to appoint him CEO in her place. In the eighth-season finale, Robert departs from the company after David Wallace purchases Dunder Mifflin.

California is an original character and has no counterpart on the original British version of the series.

== Storylines ==
=== Seasons 7–8 ===
Robert first appeared in the seventh season finale, "Search Committee", as an interviewee for the Scranton branch Manager position. His intense personality disturbs the search committee, though Jim Halpert admits that, while Robert "creeps [him] out", he believes he "might be a genius". In a talking-head interview held in the parking lot, Robert informs the documentary film crew that he is confident that he will be offered the job.

In the season 8 premiere, "The List", it is revealed that Robert was hired as the branch manager over the summer. But, after one look at his new workplace environment, he quickly drives to Florida and convinces Sabre CEO Jo Bennett (the CEO of Dunder Mifflin Sabre at the time) to give him her job. Once CEO himself, he appoints Andy Bernard as the Regional Manager. Jim notes that when Robert visits the office, he spends half of his time working out of the conference room, and occasionally ventures out and wanders around, randomly choosing employees to have conversations with. Robert makes a list of all the workers in the office, dividing them between perceived "Winners" and "Losers"; after finishing the list, he takes the winners out to lunch. When confronted about the list, Robert states that those are his impressions, and they could change, challenging the office with: "winners: prove me right; losers: prove me wrong". Andy later intercedes on behalf of the 'losers', making a new list on his team of 'winners' relaying their positive and productive qualities observed over years in the office and from being their supervisor; Robert appears to gain respect for Andy's effort, as it unites the office around him. Andy begins trying to get on Robert's good side, and he organizes a garden party at Schrute Farms during "Garden Party", to impress him.

In "Spooked", Robert's young son, Bert, is introduced; Robert brings Bert to the office Halloween party. Robert's wife, Susan (Maura Tierney) is introduced in "Mrs. California"; Susan comes to the office looking for a job, something he does not want, although he pretends to help her out. Andy ends up giving her an accounting job, enraging Robert. Andy then gets the staff to be mean to her to urge her to quit. She ultimately catches on and confronts Andy and her husband. At the end of the episode, Susan asks Andy on a date. In "Christmas Wishes", it is revealed that Robert and Susan are getting a divorce, prompting him to become despondent and lonely. At the branch Christmas party, Robert comforts Erin, who is upset over Andy's new girlfriend. Robert decides to sell his mansion following his divorce, and at Kevin's suggestion, throws an office pool party as a last hurrah.

Robert appears in "Last Day in Florida", accompanying Dwight, Jim, and Nellie Bertram on a golf outing celebrating Dwight's new vice president position. After playing, Robert stuns Jim by revealing that he dislikes the business plan for the Sabre store, and that he had only approved of it because Jo wanted it. But with the knowledge that Sabre products are inferior and will illuminate the fact that the store is a failure, he plans to sandbag it at a high-level meeting of the Sabre company board, and also strongly hints that, despite liking Dwight, he is going to fire him over it. Later, after Jim stops Dwight from attending the meeting, Nellie appoints Todd Packer as vice president in his place. During the meeting, Robert chastises Packer for the failure of the store, pretending that the Sabre store itself was a great concept, but that Packer botched in execution. While Packer protests that he has only been vice president for half an hour, and that Dwight is to blame, Robert commends Dwight for being smart enough not to show up at the meeting, and terminates Packer. Robert later allows Nellie to have a job at the Scranton branch; Nellie declares herself as the new manager, despite the fact that Andy is already employed as Regional Manager. At Nellie's welcome party, Robert makes very obvious attempts to make a good impression on her.

In "Angry Andy", Andy enlists Robert to give him his job back from Nellie by claiming it was an interim position for her. Nellie refuses, but manipulates Robert by flirtatiously hinting that she is attracted to him. Robert then stays detached from their conflict until Andy has an anger outburst, in which he throws his chair at Robert and then punches his hand through the wall over Nellie stealing his job. Robert then chooses Nellie as the branch Manager and fires Andy.

In "Turf War", while celebrating the finalization of his divorce, Robert drunkenly shuts down Dunder Mifflin’s Binghamton office, leaving the other branches to fight over their clients. Meanwhile, Andy decides to land an important Binghamton client as a "rogue" and jumpstart his Dunder Mifflin comeback by using his success as leverage with Robert. After Nellie reveals to Robert that he sent her a sexually suggestive voicemail, Robert tasks Pam to find out what the voicemail entailed. Pam manages to steal her cellphone, however, as Robert goes through Nellie's messages, Pam relents and tells Robert that she will not help him anymore. The two struggle over the phone, but Pam manages to delete the messages before Robert can hear his voicemail. Later, Andy calls Robert, after having stolen his largest client, and offers him the client back if Robert will rehire him. Meanwhile, Jim and Dwight talk with Harry Jannerone, an employee from the Syracuse branch, who predicts that Robert will ruin the company within six months.

In "Free Family Portrait Studio", Robert is surprised when he learns that David Wallace is purchasing Dunder Mifflin. After talking with Robert in the conference room, David announces that Robert is leaving, but that he will be working on an important new charity: seeing college-aged girls (particularly gymnasts) in developing countries on their paths through to college. Wallace also mentions that he has donated one million dollars in matching funds for Robert's three-year-long mission. Robert bids Andy goodbye, kisses him on the mouth, and states that "It's been a great year".

== Development ==
James always wanted this to be a one-year arc, and he now leaves us having created one of the most enigmatic and dynamic characters in television.

— Paul Lieberstein.

James Spader first appeared on The Office in the episode "Search Committee". He was originally expected to be just a one-time guest star, as the producers were planning to hire either Catherine Tate or Will Arnett for the series, but neither could commit due to their involvement with other projects. In an interview with Digital Spy, Spader stated "I never really considered whether I would do more [episodes]". "Then....suddenly [the producers] called me back again and said, 'We'd really ... like your character to come back in some capacity'". While Spader was initially hired as the replacement for Steve Carell in the series, Spader's presence actually filled the void of two departed actors: Carell, and Kathy Bates, who left the show in order to focus on her starring role in the NBC drama Harry's Law. Spader was also the second actor to receive an "And" credit, after Amy Ryan, during her appearances in season seven. Spader stated in an interview that he only took the role in order to supplement his income after working on Lincoln, which he stated paid little due to the size of the cast. He only ever intended for his role to last one season.

On February 28, 2012, Spader announced that he would be departing from the show at the end of its eighth season. The season eight finale, "Free Family Portrait Studio", marked his final appearance in the series.

== Reception ==
The character of Robert California was met with acclaim during his guest appearance on the season 7 finale "Search Committee". In the IGN review for "Search Committee", Cindy White cited the guest appearance by Spader as being the "meatiest part [of the episode]", comparing Robert's role of the "dominating boss" to that of Spader's similar character in Secretary. In James Poniewozik's review of the episode, he wrote that "James Spader killed as an overqualified candidate who was creepily perceptive". While his review was less favorable, Alan Sepinwall wrote that he found "Spader's persuasive evil genius to be somewhat amusing". Seth Abramovitch, of TV.com, wrote that he enjoyed Spader's "mildly sociopathic (but highly effective)" portrayal of Robert. In her review, Kaili Markley wrote that Spader's appearance in the episode was the "high point of the show" for her. BuddyTV's Meghan Carlson wrote that Spader was "the most memorable and impressive guest".

Spader's acting had been particularly lauded by his fellow Office cast members. In an interview with Huffington Post, Brian Baumgartner stated that "the energy [Spader] has is so totally different. The writers have done really a great job. He has these demented arguments that on the surface make no sense, but he's talking, and suddenly and you're like, 'Oh yeah, that's right! That's right!'". In the same interview, Kate Flannery commented that Spader "has this grounded intensity that we've never seen on our show before that makes these kind of little Scranton peons stand at attention". In an interview with NBC Chicago.com, Angela Kinsey praised Spader's portrayal of California, stating "He is amazing. Our first table read with him was a week before we went back and at that moment I was like, 'Oh, we're going to be just fine'. He crushed the table read. He brings such a cool, amazing, intensity as Robert California that's so different from Michael Scott. Michael wanted everyone to love him. Robert California wants to run the best company in the world, and to see him turn that kind of intensity onto Kevin Malone was cracking me up. I just love him as this character. And it's been really fun to watch Dwight and Robert California act". Paul Lieberstein was pleased that Spader would be joining the cast in the eighth season, stating that "James has an energy that is completely his own, and 'The Office' has no tools for dealing with this guy. We're thrilled he's joining our cast". On July 28, 2011, Rainn Wilson favorably tweeted, when referring to Spader's acting on the series, "[he's] Killing it!!!!". Former leading actor Steve Carell was also impressed by the decision to hire Spader, stating in an interview with Access Hollywood, "I think it's an excellent choice. I think it's great and he will infuse all this new energy into the show".

However, as time passed, critics, even ones who had initially praised Robert, began to respond negatively to the character. In his review for the episode "Gettysburg", Chris Plante, of New York, critiqued the way that Robert, as well as Andy, were being written, writing, "That isn't to say every character has been fleshed out well. ... Andy and California seem off point." In his review for "Mrs. California", Plante called Robert the worst part of The Office. While initially reacting positively to the character, by the episode "Doomsday", Seth Abramovitch wrote that "Spader's character is a lot more successful a fit than Will Ferrell's, whose brand of comedy was just too broad, too surreal for the Dunder-Mifflin crew. Robert California has definitely added some menace and mystery to the proceedings. He's funny, too. But the way the show is using him so far—sparingly, as an aloof, omniscient, and fearsome motivator—is essentially as nothing more than a plot instigator, and it's doing nothing to enrich the series. It's also getting repetitive". In his Hitfix blog, Alan Sepinwall wrote that "Robert California could have become the new comic engine that drove the series, but the character has been neutered from his first appearance. Instead of a lunatic capable of performing the Jedi mind trick, he's just an inscrutable eccentric, who wanders around looking amused at everything the branch is up to, and whom no one can get a read on". Myles McNutt, of The A.V. Club, criticized Robert's role as one "that the narrative reacts to as opposed to something actually involved in the narrative".

Salon.com's Matt Zoller Seitz wrote that "The Office loses something by having Spader's Zen master drive the action instead of Michael Scott"; he also suggested that, perhaps, if Robert was still positioned as Regional Manager, instead of CEO, the series might be more enjoyable. In response to this, Myles McNutt wrote "It may just be me, but I'm not convinced that Spader's presence has been as prominent as Seitz suggests. While I would agree that Robert California alters the tone and rhythm of the series when he is present, he isn't present particularly often (and wasn't present at all during what Seitz and I would both identify as the season's strongest episode, "Lotto") and, even when he is present, he isn't really being developed as a character with motivations or multi-dimensionality. His omniscience is valuable on some level, but it also creates a distance between the character and the narrative, which makes me reluctant to consider him as Carell's replacement (which is what Seitz suggests in his piece). In truth, and picking up on something I suggested last week, I think I would be enjoying this season a lot more if Spader were positioned as Carell's replacement, and we were seeing the season from his perspective".

In White's review of "Last Day in Florida", she wrote that "As for Robert's return, I don't think it's a coincidence that the weakest episode of this otherwise strong [Florida story arc] was the only one in which he appeared. ... Robert has had his moments of brilliance in the past, but this wasn't one of them. He was merely a tool here, and yeah, I mean that in both senses. It's pretty clear by this time that the writers have never quite gotten a handle on the character or figured out how to use him properly since he joined the cast. With Spader leaving at the end of this season, that won't be a problem for much longer. In the meantime, we have to put up with a character who is all over the map. One week he's quirky and zen, the next week he might be vulnerable and mopey, the next he's a ruthless, calculating executive. There's still some time to pin him down by the season finale, it's just hard to imagine at this point". In her review of the season 8 finale, she wrote "At least we saw that last of Robert California, who walked away with $1 million to travel around Europe educating gymnasts. Um, okay. I'm too pleased to see him go to care about the logistics".
