= Lindsey Broad =

American television, stage, and film actress

- Occupation: Actress
- Years active: 2006–present
- Children: 2

Lindsey Broad is an American television, stage, and film actress. She is best known for her role as flirtatious temp Cathy Simms on the NBC series The Office.

Her film credits include 21 Jump Street, Don Jon, and Get Him to the Greek. She also starred on the Fox sitcom 'Til Death and appeared opposite Stephen Merchant on the HBO series Hello Ladies. Her theatre credits include the world premiere of Sukie and Sue: Their Story, by Michael John LaChiusa, at the Blank Theatre.

She starred as Karen Rosenberg on the IFC series Benders, which was canceled in 2015.

== Filmography ==
=== Film ===
Year	Title	Role
2010	Get Him to the Greek	Pocket Dial Girl
2012	21 Jump Street	Lisa
2013	Don Jon	Lauren
2016	Baked in Brooklyn	MJ
2021	Trust	Eleanor
2025	Materialists	Linda

=== Television ===
Year	Title	Role	Notes
2006–2009	The Burg	Spring	Web-series, 13 episodes
2007	Gossip Girl	Melanie	Episode: "Pilot"
2007	Without a Trace	Rachel	Episode: "Absalom"
2008	Ghost Whisperer	Lucy Benjamin	Episode: "Slam"
2009–2010	'Til Death	Allison Stark	Series regular
2011–2012	The Office	Cathy Simms	12 episodes
2013	Hello Ladies	Annie	Episode: "The Date"
2015	Zoo	Aspen	Episode: "Fight or Flight"
2015	Benders	Karen Rosenberg	Series regular
2016	Blindspot	Kristin	Episode: "Of Whose Uneasy Route"
2016	Last Week Tonight with John Oliver	Rebecca	Segment: "American Petroleum Institute lobbying"
2016	Kevin Can Wait	Brandi	Episode: "Beat the Parents"
2019–2022	In the Dark	Chelsea	17 episodes
2021	Impeachment: American Crime Story	Karin Immergut	3 episodes
2022–2025	Ghosts	Judy	5 episodes
2022–2023	Julia	Dorothy Zinberg	5 episodes
