= Andy Bernard =

Fictional character on NBC's The Office

- The Office character
- Ed Helms as Andy Bernard
- First appearance: "Gay Witch Hunt" (2006)
- Last appearance: "Finale" (2013)
- Created by: Greg Daniels
- Based on: Andrew Bernard (namesake)
- Portrayed by: Ed Helms

In-universe information
- Family: Walter Bernard Sr. (father); Sister (mentioned); Ellen Bernard (mother); Walter Bernard Jr. (brother)
- Relatives: Ruth Bernard (grandmother); Joseph Dorset (grandfather); Catherine Potter (grandmother)
- Nationality: American

Andrew Baines Bernard (born Walter Baines Bernard Jr.) is a fictional character portrayed by Ed Helms in the NBC comedy television series The Office.

== Character synopsis ==
=== Season 3 (2006–2007) ===
Andy's character is introduced in the season premiere of The Office as the Regional Director of Sales at the Stamford branch of Dunder Mifflin, which subsequently merges with the Scranton branch. After Jim (played by John Krasinski) pranks him repeatedly, Andy is sent to anger management training after punching a hole in an office wall in episode 14 and is absent from the show until episode 19. Notably, in episode 21, Andy unexpectedly discovers his girlfriend is a high-school student.

=== Season 4 (2007–2008) ===
Unaware of her romantic past with colleague Dwight (played by Rainn Wilson), Andy develops an interest in and later a relationship with Angela during season 4, putting him in conflict with Dwight. This culminates in the season finale, in which Andy proposes to Angela. Later that episode however, Angela and Dwight have sex and are witnessed by Phyllis (played by Phyllis Smith).

=== Season 5 (2008–2009) ===
Still unaware of Angela's affair with Dwight, Andy begins season 5 planning their wedding. However, Michael (played by Steve Carell) later tells Andy about the affair. Andy later confronts Dwight, although they reconcile upon realizing that Angela lied to them both. Andy cancels his wedding plans and Dwight also ends his relationship with Angela.

=== Season 6 (2009–2010) ===
Andy develops an attraction to new secretary Erin (played by Ellie Kemper) during season 6, and asks her out in episode 18. However, Erin breaks up with him in episode 22 after discovering Andy's previous engagement to Angela. Andy learns of and records a printer fault in episode 24 and sends a video to the press, attracting the ire of company CEO Jo (played by Kathy Bates), but the approval of Erin.

=== Season 7 (2010–2011) ===
Erin begins a romantic relationship with Gabe (played by Zach Woods), devastating Andy. However, she gradually begins to lose interest and eventually breaks up with him, which Gabe blames Andy for. In the season finale, Andy interviews for a regional manager following Michael's departure and refuses Erin after she asks for a relationship with him again.

=== Season 8 (2011–2012) ===
Andy is appointed the new regional manager during season 8, although briefly loses the role to Nellie Bertam (played by Catherine Tate) in episode 19, regaining it in the season finale after convincing David (played by Andy Buckley) to buy out Dunder Mifflin and become CEO.

Andy introduces his new girlfriend Jessica (played by Eleanor Seigler) in episode 10, causing conflict with Erin. However, he realizes he still loves Erin in episode 18 and travels to Florida to win her back, breaking up with Jessica.

=== Season 9 (2012–2013) ===
Andy sails away in The Bahamas with his brother Walter (played by Josh Groban) in episode 6, not returning until episode 15. Neglected, Erin eventually breaks up with him for her new interest, Pete (played by Jake Lacy). Amid deteriorating relationships with her and the rest of the office, Andy pays talent agent Carla to help him pursue his dream of stardom in episode 19, and successfully gets himself fired in episode 21. In the series finale set one year later, Andy has found a job at Cornell University's Admissions Office, although he has found some fame after his tantrum in a singing competition reality TV show was parodied on Saturday Night Live. Andy exits the show with the quote to the camera: "I wish there was a way to know you're in the good old days before you've left them."

== Behind the scenes ==
The character is named after American economist Andrew Bernard, professor of international economics at the Tuck School of Business at Dartmouth College. While Andy was initially meant as a temporary character in season 3 of The Office, the character "grew" on Greg Daniels and the writers, and they decided to have Andy return to the office from anger management and become a permanent character.

== Reception ==
Initially considered an abrasive addition to the show, Andy Bernard later became a fan favorite due to his character development throughout the series. Fans reportedly did not enjoy Andy's arc in the final season, which saw him revert to his worst tendencies shown in earlier seasons and treat his co-workers poorly, with some commentators wondering if the show's writers did not know what to do with the character.

Andy was named one of the most annoying TV characters of 2011 by Vulture. Nerve ranked him the second funniest character in the series, behind only Michael Scott. During the final season, Alan Sepinwall of Uproxx described Andy's personality as a "malevolent version of Michael Scott", while Erik Adams of The A.V. Club wrote that "no amount of last-minute humanizing can win the audience back to [Andy's] side".
