= Jarrett Maier =

American actor

- Born: Chicago, Illinois, United States
- Occupation: Actor
- Website: www.jarrettmaier.me

Jarrett Maier (born July 11, 1998) is an American actor known for playing Hugh Hefner as a teenager in the Amazon Studios series American Playboy: The Hugh Hefner Story.

== Early life ==
Maier was born in Chicago, Illinois, but grew up in the city of Lafayette, Indiana. He attended McCutcheon High School where he began to show interest in the performing arts. He returned to Chicago to continue his acting career in 2016.

== Career ==
Maier made his official screen debut in 2014's Holocaust drama film Your Ever After which formed his partnership with director Tre Manchester. "Your Ever After" went on to screen at the 2015 River Bend Film Festival, at that point located in South Bend, Indiana before the festival moved to Goshen, Indiana.

Jarrett went on to star in the 2017 drama film The Things We've Seen (2017 film), opposite actors Randy Ryan and Jordon Hodges. He portrayed the fictional character of Reagan Boem, who sets off to find his fugitive father in an economically depressed, Midwestern United States town. The Things We've Seen would go on to screen around the United States, winning seven awards and four nominations at multiple film festivals.

For his work in the film, Maier was awarded the Rising Star Award at the 50th Worldfest Houston International Film Festival. The Houston Critics Choice Society also nominated him for "Best Supporting Actor". At the MayDay Film Festival, Maier was awarded "Best Actor" for his role as Reagan.

In 2017, he also appeared in the Docudrama American Playboy: The Hugh Hefner Story, produced by Stephen David Entertainment and distributed by Amazon Studios, where he portrayed Hugh Hefner as a teenager, before he built the Playboy empire.

== Filmography ==
=== Film ===
Year	Title	Role	Notes
2014	Your Ever After	Franz	
2017	Beware of the Klowns	Clown Boy	
2017	The Things We've Seen	Reagan Boem	

=== Television ===
Year	Title	Role	Episodes
2017	American Playboy: The Hugh Hefner Story	Teen Hugh Hefner	"Before the Bunny: Marilyn Monroe" "My Way"

== Awards ==
- "Best Actor" | MayDay Film Festival
- "Rising Star Award" | 50th Worldfest Houston International Film Festival

== Nominations ==
- "Best Supporting Actor" | Houston Critic's Choice Society
