= Malcolm Barrett =

Malcolm Barrett may refer to:

- Malcolm Barrett (actor) (born 1980), American actor
- Malcolm Barrett (Stargate), a character in the Stargate franchise
