= New Guys =

- The Office episode
- Episode no.: Season 9 Episode 1
- Directed by: Greg Daniels
- Written by: Greg Daniels
- Cinematography by: Matt Sohn
- Editing by: David Rogers; Claire Scanlon
- Production code: 9001
- Original air date: September 20, 2012
- Running time: 22 minutes

Guest appearances
- B. J. Novak as Ryan Howard; Mindy Kaling as Kelly Kapoor; Jack Coleman as Robert Lipton

Episode chronology
← Previous "Free Family Portrait Studio"	Next → "Roy's Wedding"
- The Office (American season 9)

"New Guys" is the first episode of the ninth season of the American comedy television series The Office, and the show's 177th episode overall. It originally aired on NBC on September 20, 2012. The episode was written and directed by series creator Greg Daniels; this is his first writing credit for the series since the seventh season episode "Goodbye, Michael", and his first directing credit since "PDA".

The series depicts the everyday lives of office employees in the Scranton, Pennsylvania branch of the fictional Dunder Mifflin Paper Company. In this episode, two new employees (Clark Duke and Jake Lacy) are hired by the Scranton branch and cause trouble for Dwight Schrute (Rainn Wilson) and Jim Halpert (John Krasinski). Andy Bernard (Ed Helms) returns from manager training, hoping for revenge on Nellie Bertram (Catherine Tate). Oscar Martinez (Oscar Nunez) considers adopting Angela Lipton's (Angela Kinsey) cat. Kevin Malone (Brian Baumgartner) tries to save a turtle.

"New Guys" was the inception of several story arcs and saw the departures of Mindy Kaling as Kelly Kapoor and B. J. Novak as Ryan Howard, due to their involvement in the former's own sitcom The Mindy Project. "New Guys" received largely positive pre-release reviews from television critics. Post-release reviews were mixed; while many felt that the episode was a distinct step in the right direction for the show, others took issues with some of the comedic aspects of the episode. "New Guys" was viewed by 4.28 million viewers and received a 2.1 rating among adults between the age of 18 and 49, making it the show's lowest-rated season premiere. The episode ranked second in its timeslot and was also the highest-rated NBC series of the night.

== Synopsis ==
Various workers in the office explain what they did over the summer: Kevin Malone tried to save a turtle that he ran over, making a new shell after he cannot put the old one back together. He broke the new one as well, so made a second one, but found the turtle was already dead, likely from when he ran it over the first time. Kelly Kapoor moved to Ohio with her fiancé Ravi and Ryan Howard also moved to Ohio for "unrelated reasons". Dwight Schrute made a new “energy drink” from beet run-off and also learned that he is not the biological father of Angela Lipton's baby. Jim and Pam Halpert reveal that Jim was offered an entrepreneurial sports job by an old college friend based on an idea the two had in college. Jim tells the camera that he turned it down, because the long distance would not be good for his family. Pam and Jim begin to take off their microphones and Pam makes a remark, noting that, after nine years, the cameramen should have enough footage for a documentary. One of the cameramen then addresses the two, saying that they are more interested in the developments of the office workers themselves, especially Jim and Pam, rather than the office now. Jim looks pensive when Pam tells the cameramen that they expect to live a calm, normal life, given their work and children, and that “nothing interesting is going to happen to [them] for a long, long time.”

Two new employees, Clark Green and Pete Miller, who are quickly dubbed "Dwight, Jr." and "The New Jim" based solely on their respective visual similarities, are hired by the Scranton branch and cause trouble for Jim and Dwight. At first, Dwight is happy to have a protégé, acting as a fatherly figure to Clark (which disturbs Clark), but soon begins to fear that Clark is after his job. Jim, on the other hand, does not feel that he and Pete have anything in common. However, after hearing Pete discuss his future plans, Jim realizes that he used to have Pete's ambition but has become stuck at the same job for over nine years. Angela puts one of her cats, Comstock, up for adoption as her baby is allergic to it. Oscar Martinez initially refuses to adopt Comstock despite Angela's pleas, but agrees to adopt it after learning that it is her husband Robert's favorite cat. It is implied that Robert and Oscar are having an affair, as Robert told Angela he was having a business dinner on the night he actually had plans with Oscar.

Andy Bernard returns from Outward Bound manager training — where he became more "decisive and confident" — hoping for revenge on Nellie Bertram for commandeering his job during the previous spring. To do this, Andy sets up a slackline in the parking lot and makes the employees walk across it, humiliating Nellie as she insists on walking in her heels (due to disliking her feet) and fails to keep her balance (due to Andy pushing her). After Clark proves that he is talented at balancing, Dwight attempts to one-up him, but ends up failing repeatedly and hurting himself. Eventually, Dwight tries to prove his superiority by riding a bicycle across a tight-rope suspended between the roof and a telephone pole, but the printer he is using as a counterweight is not heavy enough and he ends up losing his balance and hanging from the bicycle above the parking lot, while his coworkers who were leaving look on in horror. Much to his embarrassment, he has to be rescued by a team of firefighters, while Creed Bratton mistakenly believes the incident to be a circus act, erroneously commenting that this was "not bad for a day in the life of a dog food company." While everyone is outside crowding around Dwight, Jim calls up his old college friend and tells him that he wants to be involved in the new business deal, even though he did not have Pam's approval.

== Production ==
On May 11, 2012, NBC renewed The Office for a ninth season and it was later announced that Greg Daniels, who had been the series showrunner from season one through five, would be returning. "New Guys" was written and directed by Daniels. This is his first writing credit for the series since the seventh season entry, "Goodbye, Michael", and his first directing credited since season seven's "PDA". This also marks the third time he has both written and directed an episode, after the first season episode "Basketball" and the fourth season opener, "Fun Run". Daniels later revealed that "New Guys" would be the inception of big season arcs. He went on the record saying "I'll tell you that the last couple of years, I don't think we did any big arc-type things in the way that we used to in the beginning, I think the thing we're going to do is bring back a lot of arcs". Jenna Fischer later stated that part of the Jim and Pam arc would be dependent on "things that happened in seasons past that didn't seem very relevant at the time and [that] they're going to become important this season."

"New Guys" featured one of the final few performances of Mindy Kaling as Kelly Kapoor, who left the series to star in her own comedy television series The Mindy Project, which was created for the Fox Broadcasting Company. Both Novak and Kaling appeared in two episodes of the season—"New Guys" and "Finale". The episode features both Clark Duke and Jake Lacy as two new Dunder Mifflin employees who have been hired to "go through the back log of over 4,000 unanswered customer complaints that" Kelly has ignored the past few years. Duke noted that filming the slack lining scene "was not that fun; it was really hard". He did, however, state that Helms was able to do it well "with no practice". The voice of the documentarian that responds to Jim is that of series director David Rogers. Rogers also voiced the same character in the penultimate episode opener "A.A.R.M.". Originally, Daniels had re-recorded the line in "New Guys", but ended up liking Rogers' voice better. He asked him to reprise the role in "A.A.R.M." to preserve continuity.

The official website of The Office included several cut scenes from "New Guys" within a week of the episode's release. In the first 40-second clip, Dwight tries to bond with Clark by discussing an article he read in Time magazine about dubstep. Clark teases Dwight for reading the magazine, something he considers for older audiences, but Dwight is oblivious. In the second 75-second clip, Toby calls a workplace bullying meeting and the office discusses how Andy has been harassing various people. Kevin declares that Angela bullies him, and states that she will not give him her cat because he killed his turtle "a few times". In the third and final 30-second clip, Jim tries to convince Dwight that the relationship Dwight shares with Clark is similar to that of Darth Vader and Luke Skywalker, characters from the popular science fiction movie franchise Star Wars.

== Cultural references ==
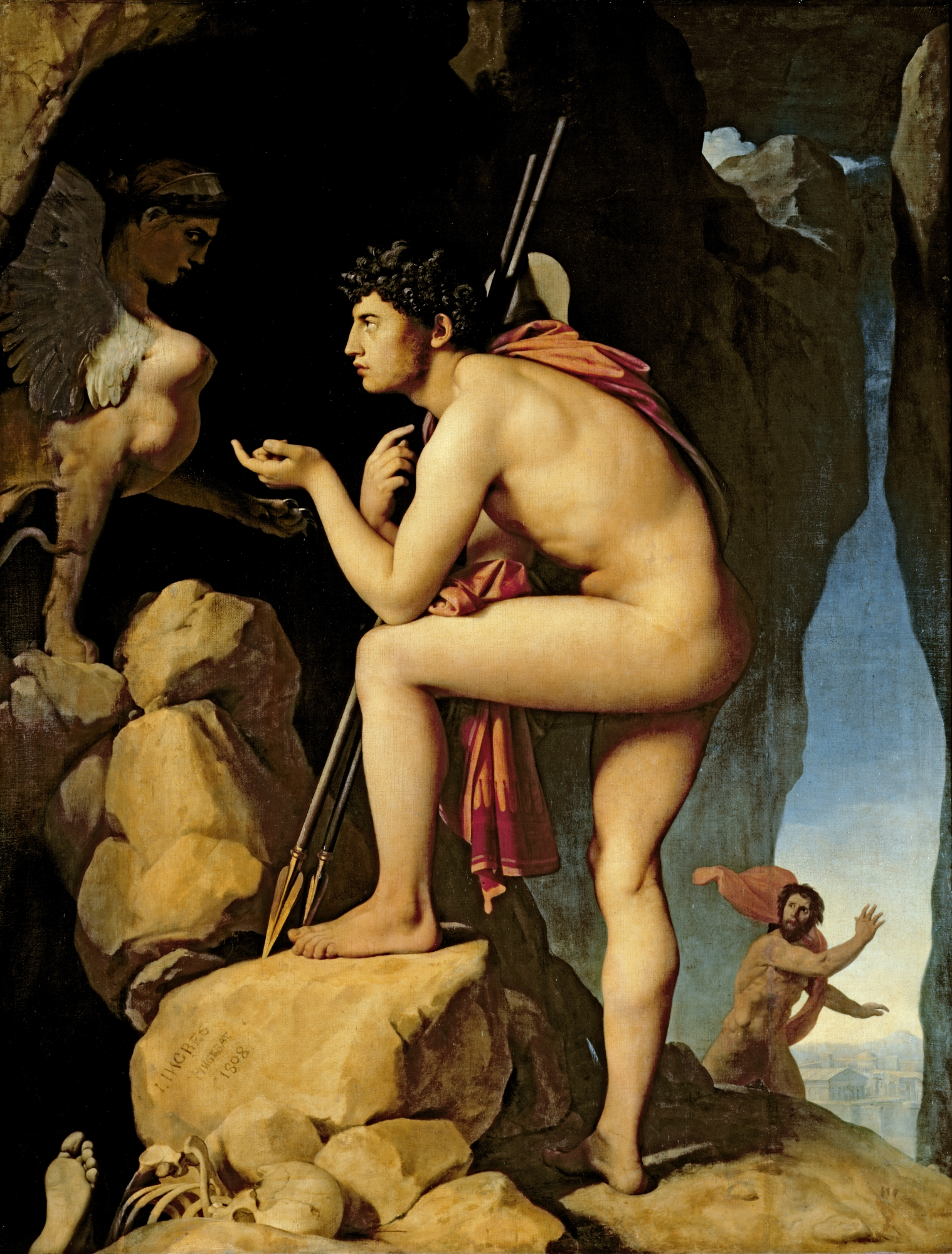
Clark's role in "New Guys" has been compared to the mythical character Oedipus.

Much like the sixth season starter "Gossip"—which featured parkour in the cold opening—the seventh season opener "Nepotism"—which started with a lip dub—and the eighth season premiere "The List"—which opened with a bit about planking—"New Guys" also contains a plot involving a popular Internet meme, in this case slacklining, which is a practice in balance that typically uses nylon webbing tensioned between two anchor points. When Ryan is leaving, he claims he is going to Ohio because "they call it the Silicone Prairie," a reference to Silicon Valley, a part of the San Francisco Bay Area in Northern California in the United States that is home to many of the world's largest technology corporations. Andy returns from Outward Bound, an organization that aims to foster the personal growth and social skills of participants by using challenging expeditions in the outdoors. Dwight tries to talk to Clark about the heavy metal band Slayer, noting that he has tickets for a show in ten months. Jim asks Pete if he likes the Philadelphia Phillies, but Pete mistakes his reference to mean horses.

Erik Adams of The A.V. Club compared Dwight and Clark's relationship to that of the mythical characters of King Laius and Oedipus, respectively. The story, which was later turned into a popular play Oedipus Rex by Greek writer Sophocles, tells of how Laius hears of a prophecy that his son will kill him. Fearing the prophecy, Laius abandons his son, Oedipus', who is raised in the city of Thebes. Oedipus later crosses paths with Laius and gets into a fight and, not knowing that Laius is his father, kills him. Adams argues that the "break-room conversation" Dwight and Clark share echoes the myth of Oedipus, given that it starts to make Dwight paranoid and fear that Clark is after his job.

Many reviewers noted that the episode made references to previous episodes of the series. The ending, featuring Dwight riding a bicycle on the roof, was positively compared to the third season episode "Safety Training". Adams wrote that many of the scenes "take characters to corners of the office tied to memories of episode's [sic] past", such as Oscar's phone call, which takes place in the stairwell where Dwight pumped himself up for his work review in the second season episode "Performance Review", and Pam climbing up the rooftop access ladder, which is reminiscent of Pam and Jim's first "date" in the second season episode "The Client".

== Broadcast and reception ==
=== Ratings ===
"New Guys" originally aired on NBC on September 20, 2012. The episode was viewed by 4.28 million viewers and received a 2.1/6 percent share in the 18–49 demographic. This means that it was seen by 2.1 percent of all 18- to 49-year-olds, and 6 percent of all 18- to 49-year-olds watching television at the time of the broadcast. This marked a 46 percent drop in viewership from the season eight premiere "The List" and made it the lowest-rated premiere of The Office to air. The Office finished second in its time slot, being beaten by an episode of the Fox series Glee, which received a 2.9/8 percent rating. "New Guys", however, finished ahead of repeats of the CBS show Two and a Half Men and the ABC series Grey's Anatomy and a new episode of The CW show The Next. The Office was also the highest-rated NBC television program of the night. "New Guys" was the twenty-first most-watched show for the week of broadcast among adults aged 18–49. This marked a slight improvement from the season eight premiere, "The List", which ranked as the twenty-second. When DVR numbers were included, the episode increased its ratings up 52 percent to a 3.2, meaning it was seen by, in total, 3.2 percent of all 18- to 49-year-olds.

=== Reviews ===
Several pre-release reviews of the episode were generally positive. Bruce Miller of the Sioux City Journal gave the episode a largely positive review and noted that "If you can erase last season from your mind, you'll see this ... is exactly how The Office should have carried on after Steve Carell left." Furthermore, he praised the addition of Duke and Lacy, calling their performances "so good you could see them become the centerpiece of a new series." Verne Gay of Newsweek awarded the episode an "A−" and called the installment "very (very) funny." He was especially happy about the addition of Lacy and Duke, calling them "flashbacks to a younger Jim and Dwight." Furthermore, he noted that "the ninth and final season actually may offer completion" of a show that has just "merely offered variations on [the characters'] tics" for the past eight seasons. Bob Owen of the Pittsburgh Post-Gazette called the episode "generally funnier than [the show] was last season" and wrote that the episode would be a good opportunity "for viewers who quit the [series] last year ... to come back to the show." Particularly, he was excited to "see the seeds of the show's end planted."

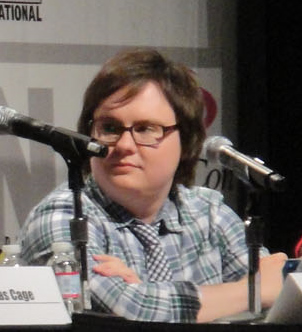
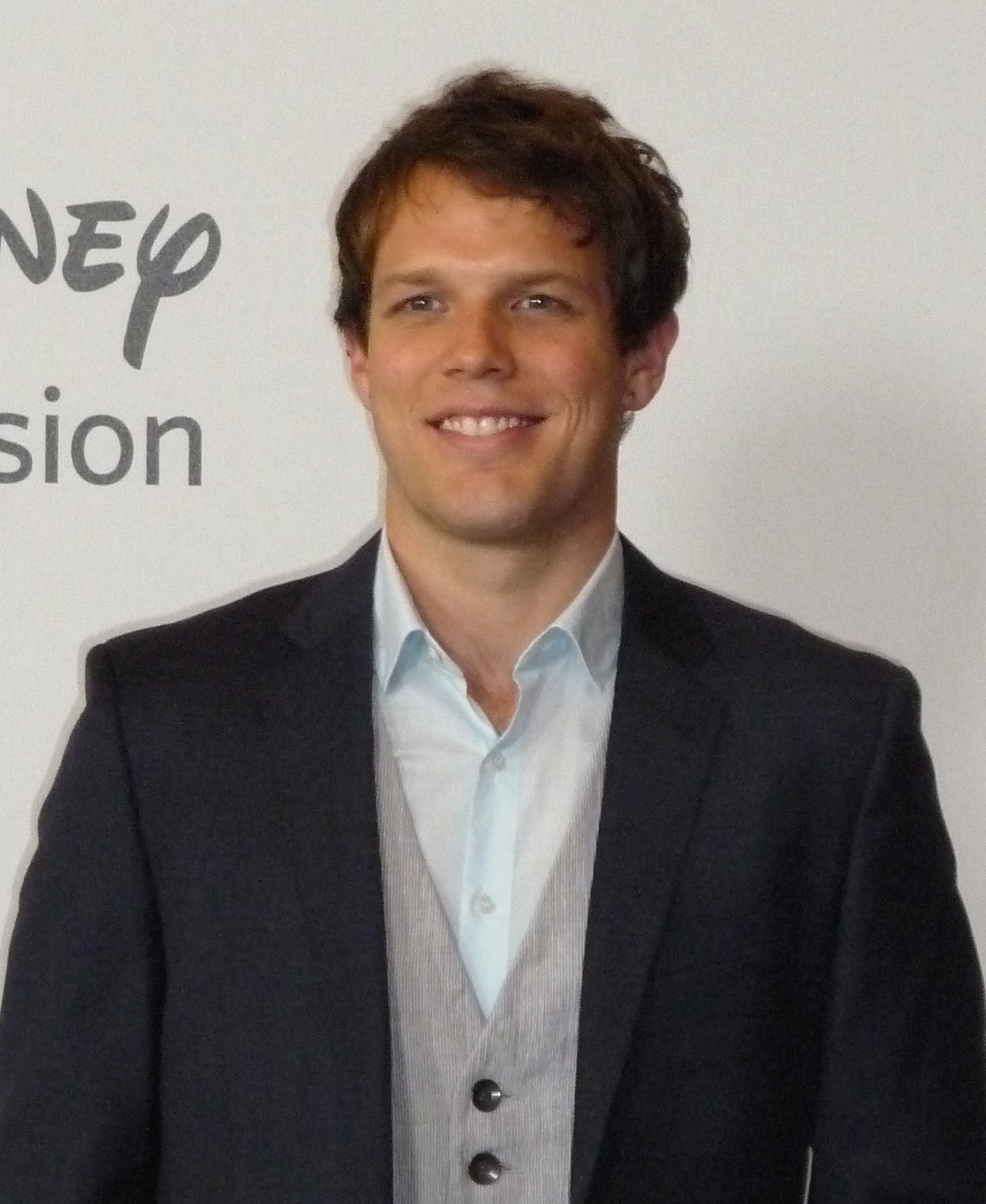
"New Guys" marked the first appearance of Clark Duke (left) and Jake Lacy (right) in The Office.

Entertainment Weekly writer Ken Tucker concluded that "New Guys" has "a lot more snap and vigor than most of last season's episodes." He was extremely complimentary towards the Pam and Jim story arc that was hinted at, noting that, after settling into a comfortable marriage, the show was finally trying to make them interesting again. David Silverberg of DigitalJournal.com called the entry "one of the show's best [premieres] in recent years" and concluded that the addition of Duke and Lacy "work as a better foil than Nellie and the creepy boss played by James Spader." Adams awarded the episode a "B+" and called it "a fresh start" for the series after the eighth season. Adams also complimented the show for "stop[ing] every so often to acknowledge the fans that have stuck with the series [and] also mak[ing] subtler callbacks to the show's glory days." He was also complimentary towards the fact that Duke and Lacy have not been thrown into stories of their own, rather, they "serve as parallels and stimulants to Dwight and Jim."

Nick Campbell of TV.com called the episode "a decent" and "moderately sharp" season premiere. He concluded that, "While the episode still wasn't on par with those of the show's earliest seasons, ... The episode wasn't lazy—and for The Office, that's a win." Other reviews were slightly more mixed. TV Fanatic reviewer Dan Forcella awarded the episode a three out of five, but was appreciative of the additions to the cast, as well as many of the actors story lines. Jeffrey Hyatt of Screencrave noted that the episode was similar in tone to the season eight finale, "Free Family Portrait Studio", but that "the addition of Lacy and Duke pay quick dividends as the opener provides flashes of comedy moxie, while helping wash away painful memories of last season." David Hinckley of the New York Daily News awarded the episode three stars out of five and wrote that "The deadpan goofiness remains fresh enough to keep fans interested" and that "the fact that this whole drama doesn't feel new and shiny anymore isn't anyone's fault. ... All The Office needs to do now is march out proudly random, zany and off-center." HitFix's Alan Sepinwall, however, was critical of the episode's humor, noting that it "didn't give me a lot of hope for a last-minute resurgence". Matt Roush of TV Guide wrote that the "one interesting storyline" may make him watch the remainder of Pam and Jim's story, but not "the rest of this sadly played-out workplace comedy."

Many reviews were complimentary towards the interaction Pam and Jim had with the cameramen. Silverberg called it "a nice surprise". Tucker called the sequence one of the "biggest reveals" in the episode. Sepinwall, despite being critical of the episode's humor, found the sub-plot "interesting". He called it "a character arc I've been waiting for the show to remember to do for years now, and the scenes here were promising (if not incredibly funny)".
