= A.A.R.M. =

- The Office episodes
- Episode nos.: Season 9 Episodes 22/23
- Directed by: David Rogers
- Written by: Brent Forrester
- Cinematography by: Matt Sohn
- Editing by: David Rogers
- Production code: 9022/9023
- Original air date: May 9, 2013
- Running time: 44 minutes

Guest appearances
- Clay Aiken as himself; Hugh Dane as Hank Tate; Nora Kirkpatrick as Esther Bruegger; Mark McGrath as himself; Mark Proksch as Nate Nickerson; Rachel Crow as Gabriella; Aaron Rodgers as himself; Santigold as herself; Jessica St. Clair as Casey Dean

Episode chronology
← Previous "Livin' the Dream"	Next → "Finale"
- The Office (American season 9)

"A.A.R.M." is the collective name for the twenty-second and twenty-third episodes of the ninth season of the American comedy television series The Office, as well as the 198th and 199th episode overall. It was also the series' penultimate entry, airing a week before the series finale. It originally aired on NBC on May 9, 2013. This episode guest stars Nora Kirkpatrick, Aaron Rodgers, Clay Aiken, Mark McGrath, Santigold, Jessica St. Clair, and Rachel Crow.

The series—presented as if it were a real documentary—depicts the everyday lives of office employees in the Scranton, Pennsylvania, branch of the fictional Dunder Mifflin Paper Company. In the episode, Jim Halpert (John Krasinski) convinces Dwight Schrute (Rainn Wilson) that he needs to choose someone to act as an Assistant to the Assistant to the Regional Manager (A.A.R.M.); the two subsequently hold tryouts for the position. Angela Lipton (Angela Kinsey) is forced to bring her son, Phillip, to work, and Dwight thinks that he may be his son. Pam Halpert's (Jenna Fischer) final fears about her husband's love are settled. Andy Bernard (Ed Helms) attempts to get on America's Next A Cappella Sensation, but is not able to audition. Finally, all the members of the office gather at Poor Richard's Pub and watch the airing of the official in-series documentary.

"A.A.R.M." features a dramatic scene in which Jim presents a DVD of the highlights of his relationship with Pam, topped with him finally presenting her with a card he wrote in the second season episode "Christmas Party". The idea to have Jim finally give Pam his card had been considered in the writers' room for some time, but only during "A.A.R.M." did the writers feel it was the right time. In addition, the episode contained several scenes that were purposely staged to be reminiscent of past episodes of the series, with scenes mimicking unique shots in both the third season installment "Gay Witch Hunt" and the sixth season episode "The Delivery".

The episode was also viewed by 4.56 million viewers and received a 2.3/6 percent rating among adults between the ages of 18 and 49, ranking third in its timeslot, making it the highest-rated episode of the season since the earlier entry "The Boat". "A.A.R.M." received largely positive reviews from critics. The interaction between Jim, Pam, and Dwight received particular praise; many were particularly pleased with the call-back to "Christmas Party". Andy's audition subplot, however, was highly panned.

== Plot ==
Jim Halpert convinces regional manager Dwight Schrute that he needs to choose someone to act as an Assistant to the Assistant to the Regional Manager (A.A.R.M.). Jim designs several Dwight-oriented challenges as tryouts for the position, and it is inevitably found that Dwight is the most qualified. Angela Martin is forced to bring her child, Phillip, to work, after her daycare turns her child away. Dwight, upon overhearing that Phillip has been eating the type of paper which Dwight himself regards as the most flavorful, begins to think that Angela's son is his. To test this theory, Dwight offers the child either a check for one million dollars or a beet; Phillip picks the beet. Dwight tells Angela that he will marry her if the child is his, but she denies that this is the case. Dwight then confers with Jim, asking whether he should propose to Angela or his girlfriend Esther, whom he thinks is the more logical choice. Jim tells Dwight that he needs to put aside logic and follow his instincts. Dwight makes up his mind and proposes to Angela, who says yes. Angela reveals to Dwight that Phillip is his son, explaining that she lied about his parentage in order to test Dwight's feelings for her.

Darryl Philbin returns to Scranton, after quietly quitting a week ago to work full-time at Athlead, the sports marketing company that Jim founded. When the others spot him, they are upset that he left without saying goodbye and demand to spend some time with him before he leaves for good. They ultimately decide on one final dance together. Everyone has a fun time, and Darryl is glad he got to say a real goodbye.

When Darryl runs into Pam Halpert, he tells her about the company's success and how Jim is missing out by staying in Scranton. Pam begins to worry that she is making Jim do something that he does not want to do. She confronts her husband and admits that she thinks she might not be good enough for him. He asks for the in-series documentary crew's help; the crew makes a DVD of the highlights that they have collected of Jim and Pam's relationship. The final scene that they use is from the second season Christmas episode "Christmas Party," in which Jim gives Pam a teapot but takes back his accompanying card. After Pam watches the DVD, Jim presents her with the still-unopened card. She reads it, and the two happily embrace.

Andy Bernard, who had quit his job in the previous episode, auditions for America's Next A Cappella Sensation. However, before he is able to try out, the judges close the auditions, sending home the remaining applicants, who have been standing in line for hours. Refusing to accept this, he bolts past security and demands the judges let him audition. When they refuse, he throws a crying tantrum. Later, he journeys to Poor Richard's Pub, where he meets his former office workers and is the tie-breaking vote to turn the TVs to the official airing of their documentary on PBS's Scranton affiliate station, WVIA-TV, rather than college baseball. All together, the office watches the opening of the pilot.

== Production ==
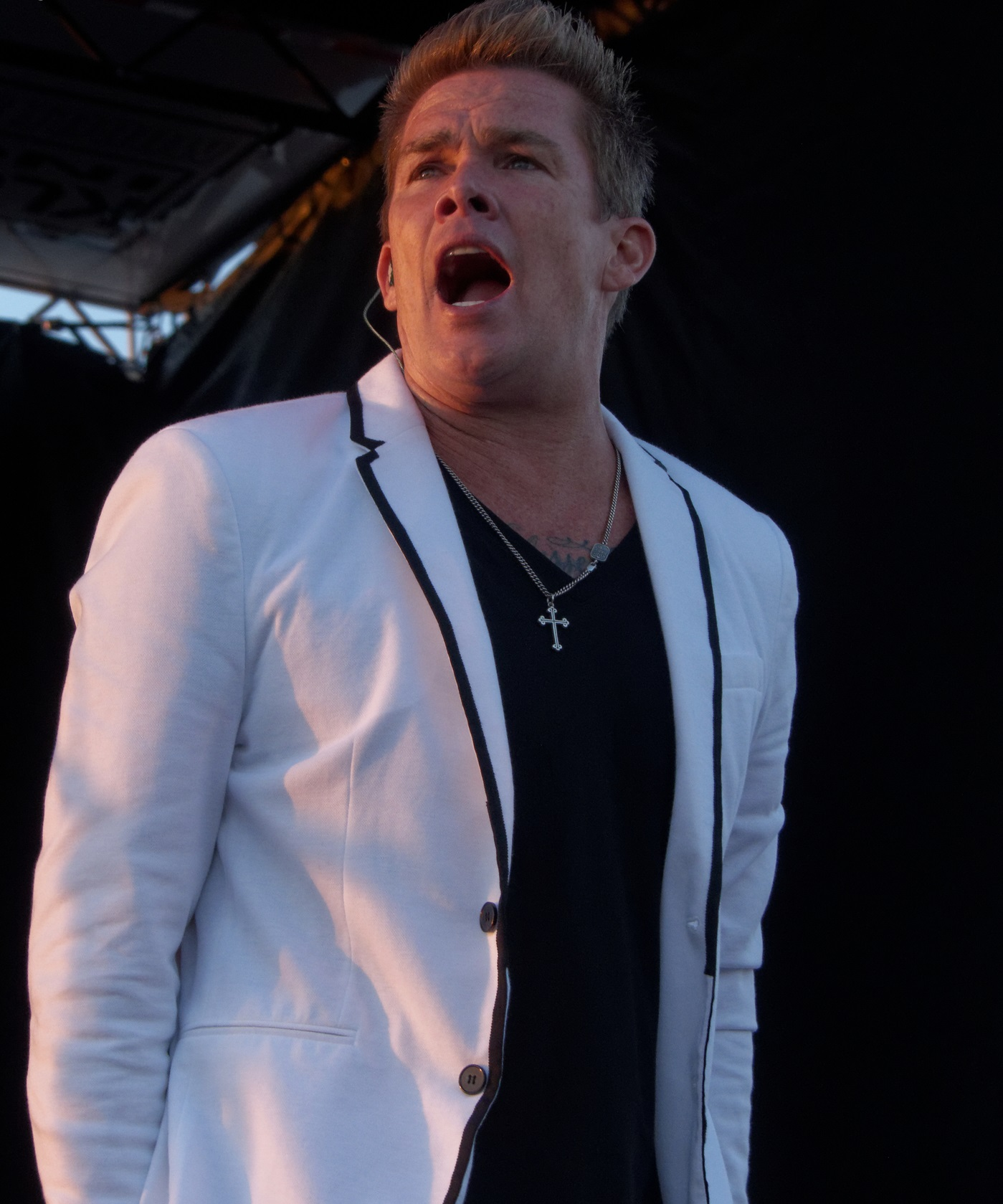
Pop rock singer Mark McGrath was one of several guest stars for the episode

"A.A.R.M." was written by executive producer Brent Forrester, marking his eleventh writing credit for the series, his first since the earlier season episode, "Work Bus". It was directed by regular Office editor David Rogers, marking his ninth directing credit, and first since the earlier season episode "Junior Salesman". The episode was originally supposed to air as a half-hour episode, but NBC later announced it would be expanded to fill an hour time slot. Unlike the previous episodes that were expanded, like "Moving On" and "Livin' the Dream", "A.A.R.M." counts as two produced episodes.

This episode guest stars Aaron Rodgers, Clay Aiken, Mark McGrath, Santigold, and Jessica St. Clair. In order to get them, the show reached out to "a small group of celebrities that [the producers] thought would be good". Both Aiken and Santigold accepted. Baumgartner then asked Rodgers, who was a friend, and he accepted. McGrath later became available, and he was chosen as well. Angela's son, Phillip, was played by twins Vince and Evan Edwards. The child that filmed the scene in which Phillip picked the beet was only supposed to point to the beet. In the end, the child said "beet!", which Rogers called "amazing". The voice of the documentarian that responds to Jim is that of episode director David Rogers. Rogers also voiced the same character in the season opener "New Guys". Originally, showrunner and series creator Greg Daniels had re-recorded the line in "New Guys", but ended up liking Rogers' voice better. He asked him to reprise the role in "A.A.R.M." to preserve continuity.

Jules Kmetzko designed the portraits of Dwight and Mose, as well as Dwight's propaganda picture. He had previously created Pam's watercolor of Dunder Mifflin that hung on the walls. All of the dance moves were choreographed by Mary Ann Kellogg, who had choreographed many of the series' dance-heavy episodes. The obstacle course in the warehouse was crafted by Rogers and Forrester, with input from the show's art department. Wilson also helped, since he eventually was the one who ran through it; it was his idea to have the course terminate on a raised pallet of boxes. Originally, the course was supposed to be in the parking lot, but Rogers moved it, feeling that the warehouse was "more organic" and that the heat would have been detrimental to the finished product. The idea to have Jim finally give Pam his card had been considered in the writers' room for some time, but only during "A.A.R.M." did the writers feel it was the right time. The card and envelope was the same one used for "Christmas Party" almost seven years prior. In fact, the card contained a genuine message that Krasinski wrote for Fischer. Rogers admitted that the Pam and Jim video was inspired by a number of fan videos that exist on the internet. The reason that "Open Your Eyes" by Snow Patrol plays over the video is that Claire Scanlon, the series editor, felt that it was similar in style to "Sing" by Travis, which played in the second season episode "The Client".

The episode contained several scenes that were reminiscent of past episodes of the series. The shot in which Jim and Dwight survey the office was filmed to be similar to a scene that featured Dwight and Michael in the third season installment "Gay Witch Hunt". In addition, Dwight pulling Angela over was filmed in a way that recalled the sixth season episode "The Delivery". Although the scene wherein Jim gives advice to Dwight was shot in a similar manner to Jim's farewell to Michael in the seventh season episode "Goodbye, Michael", it was not intentionally supposed to look like it, according to Rogers. In addition, the obstacle course was not a direct reference to the second season episode "Office Olympics", although Rogers understood that there were similarities.

== Cultural references ==
Jim references both Michael J. Fox and the 1985 film Back to the Future during his "nonsense" conference room meeting. Dwight realizes that Phillip is his son after the child looks at a small-scale replica of the Battlestar Galactica, fictional ship from the science fiction series of the same name, in the same way that Dwight does. Dwight's test to see if Phillip is his son has been compared to a similar scene in the 1997 film Kundun, in which Tibetan monks practice a similar ritual. To win over Kevin, Angela and Oscar pretend that baby Phillip presented him with a used iTunes gift card. Darryl and the rest of the office dance to the song "Boogie Wonderland" by Earth, Wind, and Fire. The show Andy auditions for America's Next A Cappella Sensation, is a parody of popular singing shows like American Idol, The Voice, and The Sing-Off. The fictional show is hosted by Mark McGrath, the lead singer from the rock band Sugar Ray. The judges for the show include Aaron Rodgers, Clay Aiken, and Santigold. Rodgers is an American football quarterback for the Green Bay Packers, Aiken is a singer who gained prominence following the second season of American Idol in 2003, and Santigold is an American singer, songwriter, and producer. Andy sings both the Cornell University alma mater ("Far Above Cayuga's Waters"), as well as "You're Never Fully Dressed Without a Smile" from the musical Annie. The woman auditioning that he interrupts is Rachel Crow, who achieved fame after competing in season one of The X-Factor.

== Reception ==
=== Ratings ===
"A.A.R.M." originally aired on May 9, 2013 on NBC. In its original American broadcast, "A.A.R.M." was viewed by an estimated 4.56 million viewers and received a 2.3 rating/6% share among adults between the ages of 18 and 49. This means that it was seen by 2.3 percent of all 18- to 49-year-olds, and 6 percent of all 18- to 49-year-olds watching television at the time of the broadcast. This marked a significant increase, of almost one million viewers, in the ratings from the previous episode, "Livin' the Dream". It was also the most-watched episode of The Office since the earlier ninth season episode "The Boat", which had aired on November 8, 2012 and was watched by 4.83 million viewers. The episode ranked third in its half-hour timeslot, being beaten by an episode of the ABC drama Grey's Anatomy which received a 3.1/9 rating and an entry of the CBS series Person of Interest which scored a 2.4/7 rating. The Office was also the highest-rated NBC series of the night.

=== Reviews ===
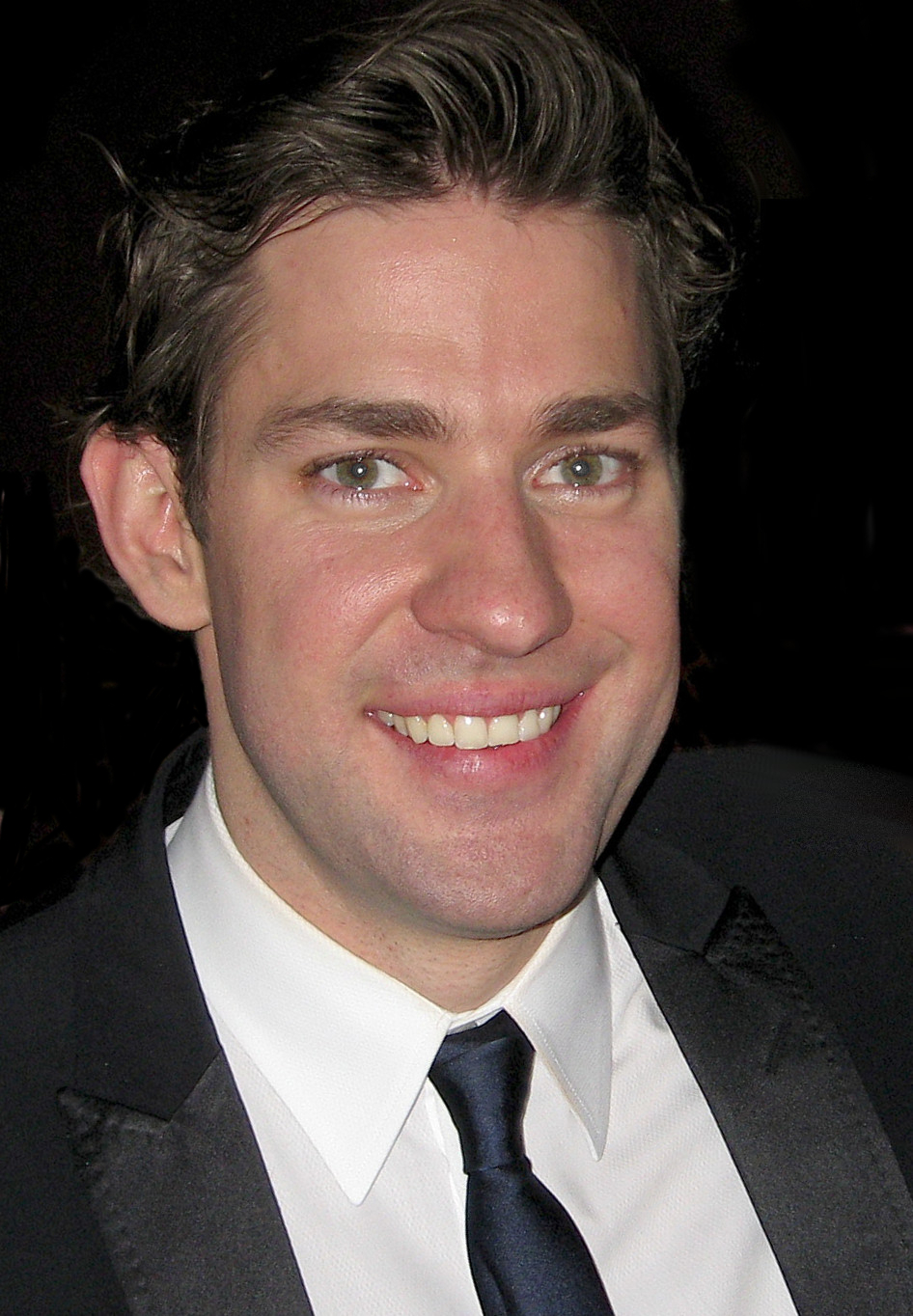
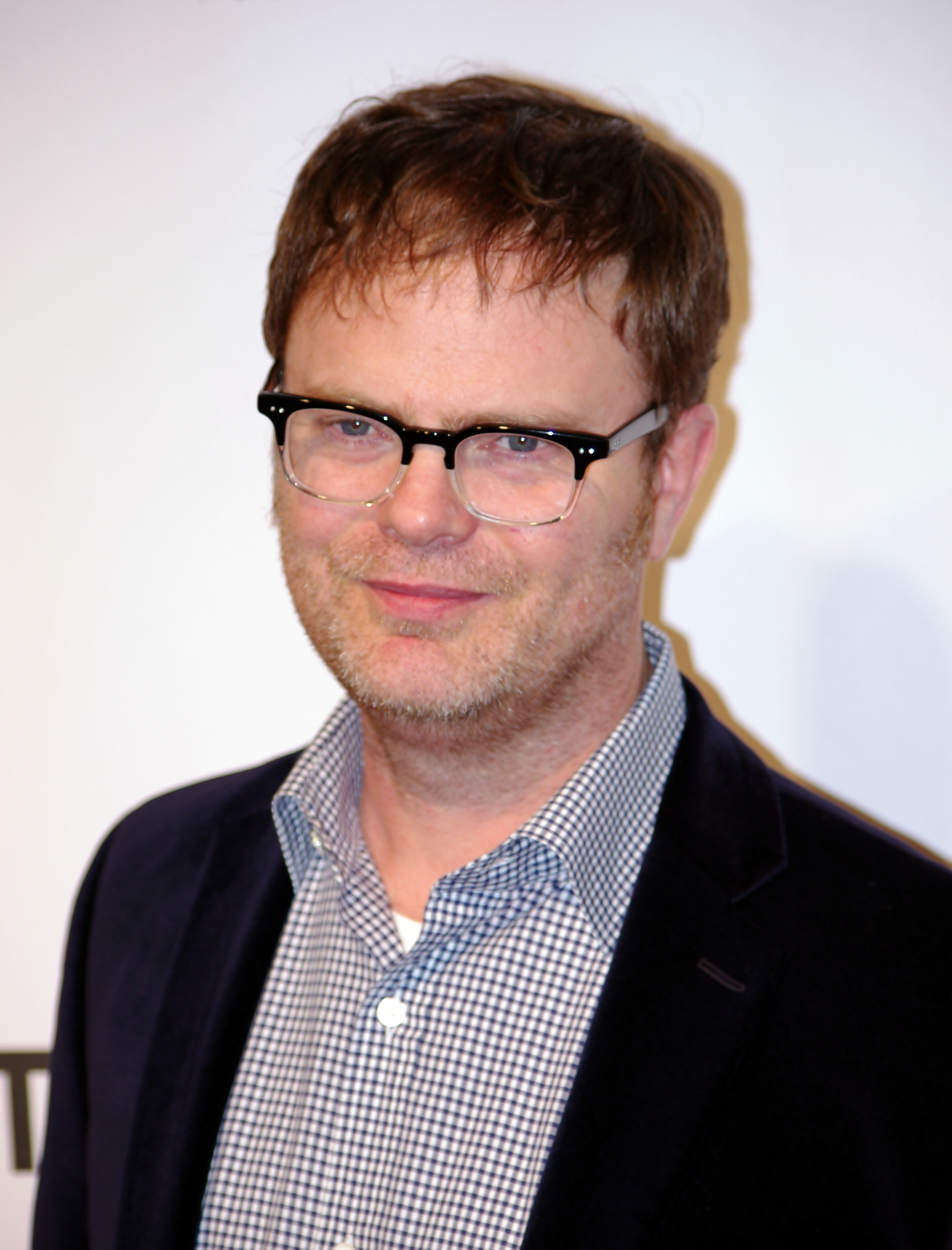
The interaction between John Krasinski (left) and Rainn Wilson's (right) characters received particularly positive reviews from critics.

Alan Sepinwall of HitFix gave the episode a positive review, and wrote that "as a quasi-finale, 'A.A.R.M.' was surprisingly ... terrific in most areas." He particularly enjoyed the interaction between Jim and Dwight, calling it "so much fun"; he argued that the show would have probably fared better following Steve Carell's departure had the power dynamic and relationship between Jim and Dwight that was explored in "A.A.R.M." been established earlier in the eighth season. He concluded that "The best parts of 'A.A.R.M.' felt like a fitting close to the non-documentary-viewing portion of the series." M. Giant of Television Without Pity was pleased with the episode, and awarded it an "A" grade, the first for the series since "Goodbye, Michael" almost two seasons earlier. Jenna Mullins of E! Online wrote that the episode "was full of emotional moments that seemed like love letters to the fans who have watched the show since the pilot." Mullins also praised the scenes between Jim and Pam, noting that "we collapsed in tears because the couple we've been rooting for ... can still find ways to make us cry."

Nick Campbell of TV.com felt that the episode was "a decent if uneven penultimate episode that gave us one last look at this quirky group of people in their office environment". He was largely happy with the return of the fun-loving version of Jim, noting that "Pam mentioned that she loves 'Goofy Jim' and I, [sic] have to admit, I love Goofy Jim myself". Campbell felt that the episode dabbled in fan service, but that it was expected and needed for the show to have a successful ending. Roth Cornet of IGN awarded the episode an 8.5 out of 10, denoting a "great" episode. She wrote that "The interplay between Jim, Dwight, and Pam has been the core of the series since Michael Scott's departure, and it was good to see the trio front and center once again as The Office comes to a close." Furthermore, Cornet was happy with Dwight's proposal and the dance party that signaled Darryl's leaving, calling the latter "a slice of bliss".

Erik Adams of The A.V. Club gave the episode a "B+". He said that "what benefits 'AARM' most ... is a back-to-basics Jim-and-Dwight storyline" that illustrated the growth that the characters have experienced in the last nine years. He wrote that there were many tender moments in the episode, such as Dwight and Jim's confrontation, Pam and Jim's reaffirmation of love, and Dwight's proposal to Angela. He concluded that "It's that blend of new beginnings and closing circles that makes 'AARM' an effective second-to-last chapter of The Office". Dan Forcella of TV Fanatic awarded the episode four-and-a-half stars out of five, and wrote that the episode "didn't disappoint". He called "the scene in which Pam was watching the docu-created montage just as Jim was giving Dwight love advice" the "most emotionally rewarding moment on The Office since Michael Scott's goodbye."

Many critics were extremely pleased with the call back to the teapot and Jim's note from "Christmas Party". Adams felt that the scene, before the reveal of the note, was properly executed, and that the note made it even better. Sepinwall called it "a fabulous payoff for longtime fans". Cornet called the sequence "effective". Rick Porter of Zap2it wrote that it was a "nice move" on the part of the writers for "not letting us know what Jim wrote on the card from 'Christmas Party' [because] it has to be pretty epic."

Conversely, most critics gave Andy's plot a negative review. Sepinwall called the entire plot "godawfulness". Campbell referred to it as "a mediocre story that stood in stark contrast to the emotional timbre of the rest of the episode". Cornet called the scenes "just as disconnected from the core of the show as that character has for some time now." Porter wrote that "the show never quite got a handle on what to do with the character this season", and his subplot in "A.A.R.M." was the culmination of this issue.
