= The Things We've Seen =

- Directed by: Tre Manchester
- Written by: Tre Manchester
- Produced by: Don Bernacky; John Metzler; Roger Welp
- Starring: Randy Ryan; Jarrett Maier; Shani Salyers Stiles; Noah McCarty-Slaughter; John D. Carver; Jordon Hodges
- Cinematography: Steven Turco; Marion Tucker
- Music by: Jon Natchez
- Production companies: Atlas Pictures; MLM Movies
- Distributed by: Multicom Entertainment Group, Inc. Beijing Spark Future International Culture Communication Co., Ltd.
- Release date: January 28, 2017
- Running time: 80 minutes
- Country: United States
- Language: English

The Things We've Seen is a 2017 American low budget drama film written and directed by Tre Manchester and produced by Don Bernacky, John Metzler, and Roger Welp. It tells the story of a boy who sets off to find his father after accusations of guilt turns the man into a fugitive.

The film was shot on location around the Crown Point, IN area and premiered in Lafayette, IN in January 2017. In March of that year, it made its film festival debut at the 20th George Lindsey UNA Film Festival where it went on to win Best Feature Film.

== Plot summary ==
There is a strike at the local mill. A stand-off with the police gets a man killed, brother Ray and Rick, who is wounded, escaping. As a result of the strike, the mill, which is the sole employer in the county, burns to the ground. The strike and the fire are devastating losses to the rural community. The Sheriff goes to Ivory Joyce Boem and tells her not to assist Ray, her husband, in any way, and that she and her two teen sons, Reagan and Neely, should get out of town.

Ray is a country singer and an absent father having left Ivory Joyce alone to raise her boys. Reagan goes to find his father. Ivory Joyce is furious to find Ray and Rick in her home. Ray tries to help Reagan play the guitar and explain his absence. Rick dies of his injury, and Ray and his two sons secretly bury him. Later that night, the Sheriff arrests Ray.

Ray tricks a deputy at the jail and escapes, returning to the Boem residence. They all say their tearful goodbyes. While Ray drives off alone, Ivory Joyce drives away down a dirt road with her sons.

== Cast ==
- Randy Ryan - Rayford Boem
- Jarrett Maier - Reagan Boem
- Shani Salyers Stiles - Ivory Joy Boem
- Noah McCarty-Slaughter - Neely Boem
- John D. Carver - Sheriff Pascal
- Jordon Hodges - Rick Boem

== Production ==
Filming began in the summer of 2015. Production occupied many scenic locations that were also featured in Michael Mann's drama Public Enemies (2009 film), including the downtown streets of Crown Point, Indiana.

The first draft of the film's screenplay was completed on September 7, 2014. The final draft was completed on September 2, 2015 just weeks before the final phase of principal photography. Filming was split into two phases beginning in June 2015, lasting four days. The cast and crew resumed production in late September 2015.

With its dark tone and contrasting visuals, the film was dubbed an "American Gothic" by The Film Yap. Much of the film's look and visual style was influenced and modeled upon the work of painter Edward Hopper.

== Official film festival selections ==
- George Lindsey UNA Film Festival | Florence, Alabama
- MayDay Film Festival Evansville, Indiana
- Julien Dubuque International Film Festival | Dubuque, Iowa
- Hobnobben Film Festival | Fort Wayne, Indiana
- Indy Film Festival | Indianapolis, Indiana
- Columbia Gorge International Film Festival | Big Bear Lake, California
- 50th Worldfest Houston International Film Festival | Houston, Texas
- River Bend Film Festival | Goshen, Indiana
- Covellite Film Festival | Butte, Montana
- Louisville International Festival of Film | Louisville, Kentucky
- Calcutta International Cult Film Festival | Kolkata, India
- Mediterranean Film Festival | Syracuse, Sicily

== Nominations ==
- "Best Picture" | Houston Critic's Choice Society
- "Best Actress" | Houston Critic's Choice Society
- "Best Supporting Actor" | Houston Critic's Choice Society
- "Best Young Performer" | Houston Critic's Choice Society

== Awards ==
- "Best Original Screenplay" - The Things We've Seen | Columbia Gorge International Film Festival
- "Best Feature" - The Things We've Seen | Mediterranean Film Festival
- "Outstanding Achievement Award" - The Things We've Seen | Calcutta International Cult Film Festival
- "Professional Narrative Feature" - The Things We've Seen | George Lindsey UNA Film Festival
- "Best Feature" - The Things We've Seen | MayDay Film Festival
- "Best Actor" - The Things We've Seen | MayDay Film Festival
- "Best Actress" - The Things We've Seen | MayDay Film Festival
- "Gold Remi Award" - The Things We've Seen | 50th Worldfest Houston International Film Festival
