= Finale (The Office) =

- The Office episodes
- Episode nos.: Season 9 Episodes 24/25
- Directed by: Ken Kwapis
- Written by: Greg Daniels
- Cinematography by: Matt Sohn
- Editing by: David Rogers; Claire Scanlon
- Production code: 9024/9025
- Original air date: May 16, 2013
- Running time: 52 minutes

Guest appearances
- Ed Begley Jr. as Martin Hannon; Andy Buckley as David Wallace; Joan Cusack as Fran Hannon; Rachael Harris as Rachel Martin; Dakota Johnson as Dakota; Sendhil Ramamurthy as Ravi; Malcolm Barrett as Malcolm; Spencer Daniels as Jake Palmer; Jackie Debatin as Elizabeth; Matt Jones as Ziek Schrute; Ameenah Kaplan as Val Johnson; Mark Proksch as Nate Nickerson; Michael Schur as Mose Schrute; Nancy Carell as Carol Stills; Eric Wareheim as Gabor; Bill Hader as himself; Seth Meyers as himself; Steve Carell as Michael Scott (uncredited)

Episode chronology
← Previous "A.A.R.M."	Next → —
- The Office (American season 9)

"Finale" is the series finale of the American comedy television series The Office. It serves as the 24th and 25th episodes of the ninth season, and the 200th and 201st episodes of the series overall. The episode was written by series developer and executive producer Greg Daniels and directed by Ken Kwapis, who directed the series' pilot episode. It originally aired on NBC on May 16, 2013, preceded by an hour-long series retrospective.

The series—presented as if it were a real documentary—depicts the everyday lives of office employees in the Scranton, Pennsylvania, branch of the fictional Dunder Mifflin Paper Company. In the episode, which takes place a year after the previous episode "A.A.R.M.", present and past employees of Dunder Mifflin gather for the wedding of Dwight Schrute (Rainn Wilson) and Angela Martin (Angela Kinsey), during which Michael Scott (Steve Carell) returns to serve as Dwight's best man. In addition, Pam Halpert (Jenna Fischer) and Jim Halpert (John Krasinski) finally decide to pursue Jim's dream of working in sports marketing. Finally, everyone comes together for a final round of interviews and goodbyes.

The initial idea for the finale, involving the Q&A, was thought of by Daniels during production of the third season. The episode features the return of many recurring characters, as well as Carell, whose return was kept secret for many months and went uncredited. B. J. Novak and Mindy Kaling, who departed the series after "New Guys", are again credited as stars for reprising their roles as Ryan Howard and Kelly Kapoor. Many members of the show's crew—such as episode writer Daniels—made cameos in the episode as various background characters, and then-Saturday Night Live stars Bill Hader and Seth Meyers appear as themselves.

The episode was viewed by an estimated 5.69 million viewers and received 3.0 rating among adults between the ages of 18 and 49, making it the highest-rated episode of the series since the eighth season episode, "Pool Party". "Finale" received critical acclaim, with many critics complimenting the writers for wrapping up the storylines for most of the characters. Critics also praised Carell's cameo, with many arguing that it was perfectly executed. This episode received three Primetime Emmy Award nominations for the 65th Primetime Emmy Awards, and won for Outstanding Single-Camera Picture Editing for a Comedy Series.

== Plot ==
=== Background ===
At the end of the previous episode, "A.A.R.M.", the in-universe documentary The Office: An American Workplace aired. Subsequent to this event, Dwight Schrute has been promoted to the regional manager of Dunder Mifflin's Scranton branch; he and Angela Martin have also agreed to be married. Andy Bernard, after being humiliated with his talent show audition tape going viral on the internet, has found a job at his alma mater Cornell University. Darryl Philbin has helped Athlead (now named "Athleap") open a branch in Austin, Texas. Stanley Hudson is enjoying retirement in Florida, and Kevin Malone, after having been fired by Dwight, now owns a bar. Toby Flenderson has moved to New York City to start a career as a writer, Nellie Bertram has moved to Poland, Creed Bratton has faked his death, and Oscar Martinez is preparing to run for a Pennsylvania State Senate seat.

=== Events ===
One year after the documentary has aired, the film crew has returned to shoot footage for DVD bonus features. Dwight and Angela are arranging their wedding, and Jim Halpert has been appointed the "bestisch mensch". Jim plans a series of "güten pränken" for Dwight's bachelor party, and the party consists of most of the current and former male employees. The group has Dwight fire a bazooka and receive a lap dance from Elizabeth the Stripper, but Dwight remains oblivious to the stripper's identity, to Jim's delight. At Angela's bachelorette party, the attendees also hire a stripper for entertainment. However, they are horrified to see that the stripper is Meredith Palmer's son, Jake. Later, Dwight's cousin Mose kidnaps Angela as part of the Schrute tradition and takes her to a bar owned by Kevin. Dwight tracks down his fiancée and, upon being confronted by Kevin, tells him that his firing was not personal but based solely on his poor job performance, which cheers Kevin up.

The following day, a panel comprising the office workers is held so that audience members can ask them questions. Dunder Mifflin CEO David Wallace expresses his distaste for the documentary, and Pam Halpert is pressed with questions about why she did not allow Jim to follow his dream after he has paid her so many romantic gestures. At the panel, Erin Hannon also meets her birth parents, who had put her up for adoption.

On the day of the wedding, Jim tells Dwight that under Schrute tradition, he is not allowed to be best man as he is younger than him. In an emotional moment, Jim surprises him with the arrival of Michael Scott, who came all the way from Colorado for the wedding; when Dwight expresses his surprise that Michael "came", Michael replies with his iconic "that's what she said" line. The wedding proceeds in Schrute tradition with Michael as Dwight's new best man. When Jim and Pam briefly return home, Jim is surprised to find Carol Stills showing their house to another couple. Pam admits that she has been showing the house for two months. She wants to repay Jim for all his romantic gestures and says she wants him to go to Athleap in Austin, at which point the couple seeing the house make an offer.

Jim and Pam go to an after-party at the warehouse where they inform an elated Darryl of their plans. Pam then unveils a new painted mural depicting the history of the Scranton branch. A final picture is taken with the employees and the camera crew before the employees go back up to the office for a final toast, where they find a wanted Creed has secretly been living out in hiding. Jim and Pam tell Dwight they are quitting, but Dwight fires them instead so he can give them hefty severance packages, as a last gesture of friendship. The employees give one last round of interviews before parting their separate ways; Creed being apprehended by the police. The episode concludes each of the characters reflecting on their time at the office, with Pam taking her watercolor of the building (that Michael bought from her in the third-season episode "Business School").

== Production ==
=== Writing and filming ===
"Finale" was written by series developer and showrunner Greg Daniels, making it his second writing credit for the year, after the season debut "New Guys", and his 12th writing credit overall. It was directed by Ken Kwapis, who had originally directed the series' pilot episode. Daniels joked that Kwapis was "the country vet who birthed this puppy" and had come "back to put it down". Prior to directing "Finale", he also directed the fifth season episode "Company Picnic". The initial idea for the finale was thought of by Daniels during production of the third season, described as "a reunion show", in the fashion of the reality show cast discussions common on reality shows like Survivor. Daniels, at one point, approached Jeff Probst, the host of Survivor, to appear in the finale as a moderator for the fictional reunion, although he declined. The initial table read for the episode took place on March 4, 2013. Filming commenced on March 6. According to Jenna Fischer, the episode took nine days to film, with the cast devoting 12 hours a day to the episode. The finale was described as "ambitious", featuring multiple location shoots, including one in an AT&T Office Building, which stood in for the Scranton Cultural Center. Filming for the episode and series as a whole came to an end on March 16, 2013. Wilson later tweeted a picture of the empty set after filming had completed.

Originally, the episode was supposed to be the 23rd and 24th episodes of the season, which would have meant that the series aired exactly 200 episodes. However, the series' penultimate episode was elongated into 2 separate episodes, resulting in "Finale" being the 24th and 25th episodes of the season. This meant that the last part of "Finale" is the series' 201st episode. Once filming finished, Daniels, in an interview with TVLine, expressed his hope to expand the episode, stating, "I was very excited with the footage we got ... It's very big. I'm going to beg NBC to super-size it or extend it." Daniels later commented that when the editors cut together the first act, it was 23 minutes long; this is much longer than a normal first act for an hour long episode of television. In response, OfficeTally—the largest fan site for the series—started an online petition to supersize the finale, similar to the petition to expand the second-season finale, "Casino Night". By May 2, the petition had received over 20,000 signatures. On May 7, it was announced that NBC had extended the episode by 15 minutes, meaning that the episode would air in a 75-minute time slot. The episode is approximately 52 minutes in length.

=== Casting ===
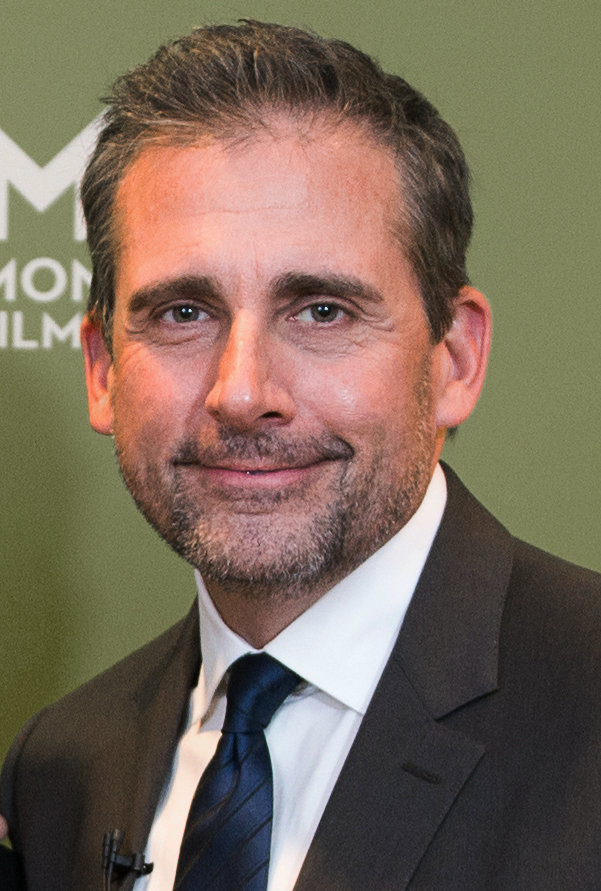
Former star Steve Carell returned for "Finale" as Michael Scott following months of speculation and anticipation regarding his appearance.

The series finale guest stars Rachael Harris, Dakota Johnson, Joan Cusack, Ed Begley Jr., and Malcolm Barrett. The episode features the return of several of the series' actors and actresses, including former series writers and stars B. J. Novak and Mindy Kaling, as well as Andy Buckley, Robert R. Shafer, Michael Schur, and Matt Jones. Other minor recurring characters also make appearances, such as Nancy Carell as Carol Stills (who played the recurring role as Michael's real-estate agent and short-time girlfriend), Sendhil Ramamurthy as Ravi (who first appeared in the eighth-season episode "Angry Andy"), Eric Wareheim as Gabor (who first appeared in the earlier ninth-season episode "Junior Salesman"), James Urbaniak as Rolf (who first appeared in the fifth-season episode "Company Picnic"), Jackie Debatin as Elizabeth (who first appeared in the third-season episode "Ben Franklin"), Devon Abner as Devon (who was a former Dunder Mifflin employee fired in second-season episode "Halloween"), and Spencer Daniels as Jake Palmer (who first played Meredith's son in the second-season episode "Take Your Daughter to Work Day"). The episode also features Bill Hader and Seth Meyers playing themselves.

Many members of the show's crew made cameos in the episode. The documentary crewman's voice that speaks to Dwight was played by camera operator Matt Sohn. The "frat boy" who mocks Andy at the restaurant was Greg Daniels' former assistant, Jonah Platt. Jay Falk, a script editor for the series, and his wife stood in for the couple buying Jim and Pam's house. Jennifer Celotta, a series writer and director, makes an appearance at Dwight's wedding. The episode's call sheet listed her character as "Jen Celotta Schrute". Producer and writer Graham Wagner also makes a cameo in both Mose's group, as well as at the wedding. Many of the individuals who asked questions were writers on the show: Brent Forrester asked about seeing their lives on TV, Amelie Gillette asked the question regarding Jim giving up Athlead, Steve Burgess asked if the camera changed the characters' behavior, Steve Hely asked if life has no meaning, Allison Silverman made the statement that Jim is attractive, and Dan Sterling asked what was in the teapot. Daniels' wife, Susanne Daniels, was the Q&A moderator. Daniels himself appeared during the documentary after-party along with executive producer Howard Klein, editors David Rogers and Claire Scanlon, script supervisor Veda Semarne, first assistant director Rusty Mahmood, prop master Phil Shea, and casting director Allison Jones. The remaining extras in the scene were members of the crew of The Office.

Jennie Tan, the founder of the largest The Office fansite OfficeTally appears in the episode as a fictional version of herself asking the members of the office questions. She initially emailed Daniels, asking if she could appear in the background in one of the scenes. He, however, hired her as a day actor and wrote her seven lines. During the filming, Daniels re-wrote part of Tan's line to make it more "pointed". Tan called the experience "surreal", because she was "playing [herself] but talking to Jim and Pam", rather than Krasinski and Fischer.

"I figured the character would go back and visit everybody, but he wouldn't do it on camera at this point. I think he had grown past the idea of being in the documentary, that was my take on it. That [Michael Scott] had said goodbye to that aspect of his life, that that's not what was important to him. I just thought, yeah he'd go back and visit, but he wouldn't want the camera crew to be documenting it."

— Steve Carell, explaining his initial hesitation to return to The Office.

Early during production for the season, Kinsey and Wilson noted in an interview that the cast and crew were hoping for the return of former lead actor Carell. In mid-December, Krasinski later revealed that he was optimistic about a return; in an interview with E! Online Krasinski said that the producers were supposedly "still trying to figure out [Carell's] schedule" and that the finale "just wouldn't be the same without him". However, NBC chairman Robert Greenblatt later admitted during an interview that while he was "hopeful", he did not think Carell would return; he noted that Carell was satisfied with his character's exit and did not want to tarnish it. On January 16, Daniels revealed that Carell would not appear in the finale in any capacity, a decision that Carell later reiterated. Several months later, however, TVLine reported that the producers for The Office mounted "an 11th hour effort" to get Carell to make a cameo in the show's final episode. According to the article, "while no one is confirming that the final diplomatic push proved successful, no one is denying it either." Carell's personal representative confirmed that Carell was on the set for the final episode, but that he did not film any scenes. However, an anonymous source close to the show cryptically said "don't rule anything out". TVLine later reported on May 6 that Carell would appear in a cameo, although NBC declined to comment and Carell's representatives continued to deny the reports. A month after the episode aired, Carell explained in an interview with TVLine that he "lied for months to the press, to almost everyone, really". He noted that he "felt terribly for the cast and for [executive producer] Greg Daniels, because they all lied, too." Krasinski, on the other hand, explained that "It was so thrilling. We all just flat-out lied... It was just one of those things that we all vowed and had to protect". At the initial table read for the script, Carell's appearance was not revealed; his first line was omitted, and his second was scripted to be delivered by Creed Bratton.

=== Deleted scenes ===
The Season Nine DVD contains a number of deleted scenes from this episode. Notable cut scenes include: more scenes from the Q&A panel; Pete discussing what he learned working at Dunder Mifflin; toasts at Dwight and Angela's wedding from Angela's sister, Phyllis, and Andy; more scenes with Erin and her biological parents in which they reconnect; further shots of the office members reminiscing about shared memories; and the office taking one of the potted plants outside and planting it in actual soil. Erin's parents explain that they, like Erin, are puppeteers, and when they worked on the movie The Dark Crystal, it gave them such gloomy thoughts they didn't think they could handle bringing up a baby. The episode originally was scripted to begin with a different cold open; it would have entailed a prank on Dwight by Jim, in which Dwight is led to believe that he is actually living in the Matrix, a computer-simulation from the eponymous 1999 film of the same name. The scene was cut from the episode and not included with the other deleted scenes, but it was shared via Facebook by Peacock TV on January 1, 2021. A table read of it—along with the rest of the episode—was included as a bonus feature on the ninth season DVD. This scene was restored for the extended cut of the finale.

== Cultural references ==
The episode makes a reference to Creed being a member of the rock band the Grass Roots. In fact, Creed Bratton, who portrays a fictionalized version of himself on the show, did play with the band from 1967 to 1969. The song he performs near the end is titled "All the Faces", which he wrote himself. Andy mentions that both the "Double Rainbow Guy" and the "Star Wars Kid" reached out to help him after his viral video mishap. Both Hader and Meyers appear in a fictional Saturday Night Live Weekend Update sketch involving Andy's viral fame. After Pam compares her and Jim's relationship to a great book that never ends, Tan's character asks if it is comparable to the Harry Potter series. Dwight claims that Google is actually a front for either the United States government or "the government of other countries".

The episode also features several callback references to previous episodes. Oscar saying "Whazzup!" serves as a reference to a scene from "Pilot" between Michael, Dwight, and Jim. Jim's description in his final talking head of his job is a direct quote from his first talking head in "Pilot". Dwight hires Devon back after Creed quits, a reference to "Halloween", when Creed convinced Michael to fire Devon. Pam sits at reception one final time and answers the phone, saying "Dunder Mifflin, this is Pam." This is a reference to Pam's former role as office receptionist and a common phrase that she said during the early seasons. Pam's painting of the office building, introduced in "Business School", plays a prominent role in the final scene.

== Reception ==
=== Ratings ===
"Finale" originally aired on May 16, 2013, on NBC in a 75-minute timeslot, preceded by a one-hour retrospective. The retrospective was viewed by 4.37 million viewers and received a 2.1/7% rating among adults between the ages of 18 and 49. The finale itself was viewed by 5.69 million viewers and received a 3.0 rating/8% share among adults between the ages of 18 and 49. This means that it was seen by 3.0 percent of all 18- to 49-year-olds, and 8 percent of all 18- to 49-year-olds watching television at the time of the broadcast. This marked a significant increase, of over one million viewers, in the ratings from the previous episode, "A.A.R.M.". It also ranks as the highest-rated episode of the season, and, in terms of viewers, it was the highest-rated episode for the series since season eight's, "Pool Party", which had been viewed by 6.02 million viewers. The episode ranked second in its timeslot, being beaten by the ABC medical drama series, Grey's Anatomy. NBC increased their usual ad price by 200 percent for "Finale", asking for $400,000 per commercial. This was largely due to the anticipated increase in viewership that the finale would bring. Via DVR viewing, the episode was watched by an additional 2.38 million viewers with an added 18- to 49-year rating of 1.4, bringing the total to 8.07 million viewers and an 18- to 49-year rating of 4.4.

=== Reviews ===
"Finale" was met with acclaim from television critics. Alan Sepinwall of HitFix gave the episode a highly positive review and called it "a tremendously satisfying conclusion to a show that could make us gasp with laughter, but that could also make us cry or smile". Sepinwall noted that, despite the inconsistency in the last few seasons, "the world was rich enough to fuel a lovely 75-minute trip through the past, present and future of The Office. Ultimately, he noted that the "biggest emotional moments" belonged to Jim and Pam, and their final talking heads. Roth Cornet of IGN awarded the episode a 9 out of 10, denoting an "amazing" episode. She was highly pleased with the final fifteen minutes, noting that "in those final moments, this series hit every note we could have wanted, without overplaying any of them." She concluded that it "was a strong hour of television [and] the finale shone and delivered on all of its promise." Hillary Busis of Entertainment Weekly praised the entry, writing that "for anyone who's stuck with The Office through thick and thin ... last night's 75-minute-long finale was pretty much perfect." She wrote that "the finale had no shortage of sob-inducing moments", and applauded all of the characters' various happy endings.

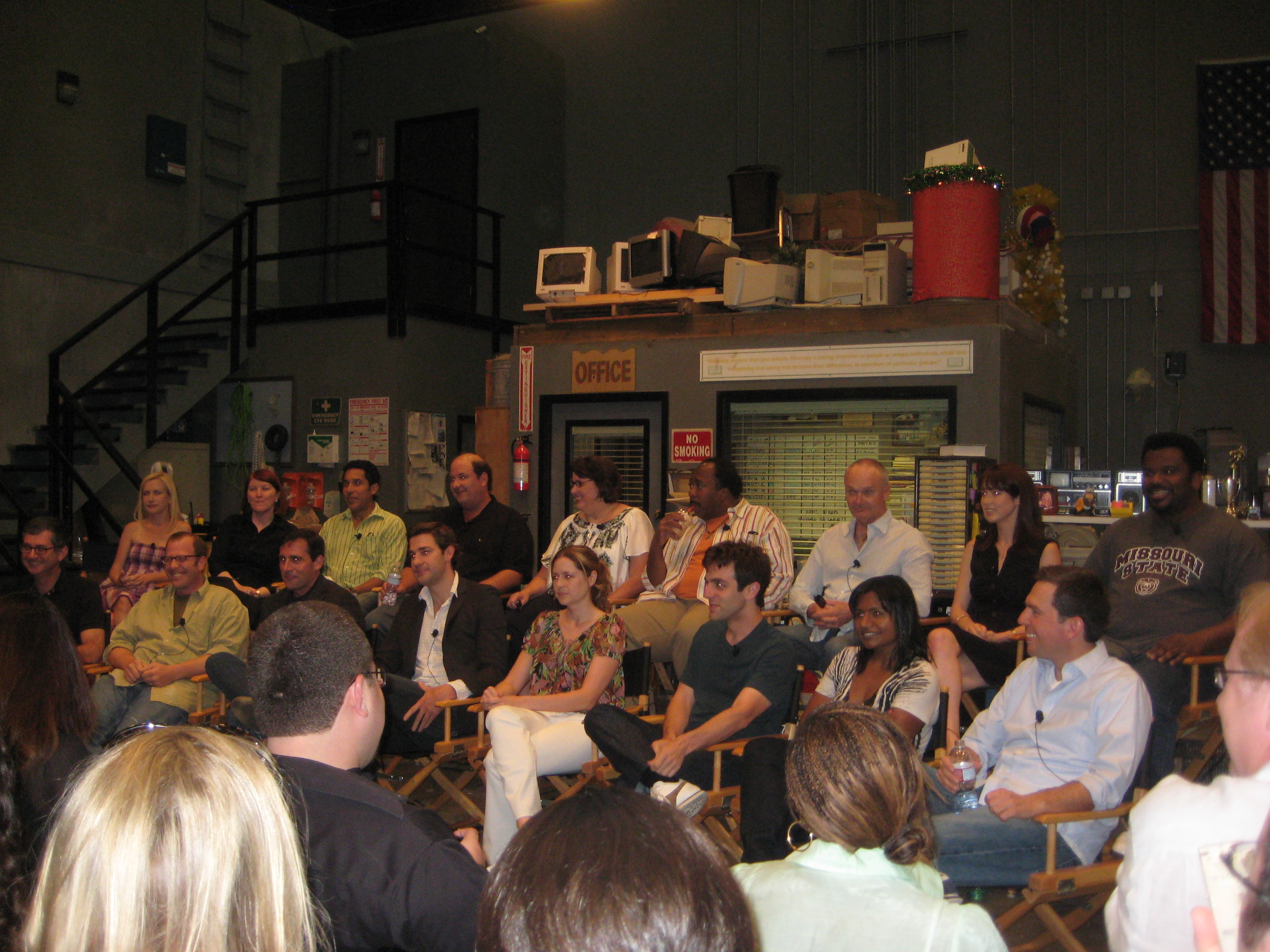
Many critics complimented the way that the series was able to wrap-up the stories of almost all of the members of the ensemble cast.

Nick Campbell of TV.com wrote that the episode was "just right" for the series, and that it highlighted the fact that "the ending was more about the fact that you took a journey with these characters." He wrote that all of the character's subplots had emotion, even if they appeared slightly contrived. Ultimately he concluded that "it felt okay to say goodbye because it was the right atmosphere." James Poniewozik of Time wrote that the finale was "touching, sweet, funny, messy, a little manipulative. And in the end, it worked." He found that "The stuff that was like latter-seasons Office", such as Andy and Dwight's antics, were "all right" but that "the stuff that recalled the sweep of the whole series was wonderful." Poniewozik was slightly critical of Pam and Jim's story, noting that in the grand scheme of the show it was successful, but that it makes slightly less sense when one examines it closely; however, he felt that even "if the details don't add up, the emotions do". He concluded that the episode "worked mostly as an epilogue" and allowed the cast of the series to have their final moments.

Brian Lowry of Variety wrote that the finale "ignored" the last few seasons' missteps and was "awash in warmth and inside gags". He concluded that the show "deserved to finish on top", and that while some of the scenes, such as Dwight's wedding, seemed "a little bit trite", the resulting product was successful. Michael Tedder of Vulture awarded the episode five stars out of five and wrote that the episode was able to provide solid conclusions for all of the characters. Erik Adams of The A.V. Club awarded the episode an "A−" and wrote that "the quality of this series finale is found in the way it functions right now, in the afterglow of a TV show to which many devoted more than 100 hours of their lives. Some aspects of the episode fall flat, but when it hits, it hits." Ultimately, he found that "'Finale' is not a great piece of television" but that it was the finale that "The Office needed" because it was "the right point to jump off ... the circular track", due to the series idea of thematic reoccurrence. Tom Gliatto of People magazine, however, gave the episode a negative review, and wrote that "this episode was poorly conceived and clumsily structured. It really wasn't worthy of all the years of affectionate humor that had gone before it."

Steve Carell's cameo received glowing reviews from critics. Campbell noted that he was "glad [Carell's] return was still uncertain [before the episode aired] because the reveal was made that much sweeter." Sepinwall noted that Carell's return managed to not "overshadow the stories of the people who remained after he left, but which made sense for the characters, and the end of the series." Adams noted that "Carell doesn't get a lot to say—he's already had his chance to say goodbye—but that just makes each of his lines count more". Cornet felt that the cameo's "brevity" was "the perfect amount of Michael for this particular episode". Poniewozik described it as "a way that as best as possible walked the line between overplaying and underplaying Steve Carell's cameo." Lowry called it a "perfectly orchestrated cameo". Basis wrote that the appearance was "pretty great" and that "the notion of Michael finally getting the family he's always wanted was enough to melt the heart of even the nit-pickiest fan."

=== Accolades ===
This episode received three Primetime Emmy Award nominations for the 65th Primetime Emmy Awards. Greg Daniels was nominated for Outstanding Writing for a Comedy Series and Ben Patrick, John W. Cook, and Rob Carr were nominated for Outstanding Sound Mixing for a Comedy or Drama Series (Half-Hour) and Animation. David Rogers and Claire Scanlon won for Outstanding Single-Camera Picture Editing for a Comedy Series, marking the fifth win for The Office at the Emmys overall and the series' first win since 2009. Rogers and Scanlon also won an ACE Eddie award for Best Edited Half-Hour Series for Television.
