= Amanda (2009 film) =

- Directed by: Steve Marra
- Written by: Steve Marra
- Produced by: Mark Agee; Steve Marra
- Starring: Ariana Dubynin; Randy Ryan; Amy Esacove; Doug Johnson; Faith Marie; Bill Bannister; Erin Raftery; Diane Timmerman; China Doll
- Music by: Phil Buckle; Michael Jan Levine
- Production company: Adrenaline Motion Pictures
- Release date: May 14, 2009
- Running time: 84 minutes
- Country: United States
- Language: English

Amanda is a 2009 romantic comedy directed by Steve Marra and starring Randy Ryan and Ariana Dubynin. The story takes place in Indianapolis, where movie was also shot. On October 4, 2009, it was released at the Louisville's International Festival of Film in the United States.

== Premise ==
Joe Bender (Randy Ryan) is a successful 40-year-old man. Joe meets his dream girl, Amanda (Ariana Dubynin), and he marries her. But when his new wife reveals a very deep, dark secret (she's a trans woman), Joe begins questioning the true meaning of love.

== Production ==
Production began on April 13, 2009. The budget was under $500,000.

== Cast ==
- Ariana Dubynin - Amanda McNamara
- Randy Ryan - Joe Bender
- Douglas Johnson - Craig Kelly
- Matthew W. Allen - Mr. McNamara's Driver
- Neil S. Bagadiong - Timid Man
- Bill Bannister - Bob Bender
- Tim Barrett - Park Mime
- Bruce Bennett - Elderly Man
- Tiffany Benedict Birkson - Woman Executive
- Tiffany Bullock - Escort Date
- Mariah Daisy-Sharp - Little Katie
- China Doll - Ineeka
- Amy Esacove - Stacy
- Richard Hayes - Convenience Store Clerk
- Lynda Lansdell - 411 Operator

== Reception ==
Jenny Elig of Metromix wrote that the film "does its job well."

Amanda won best feature film at the 2010 Canada International Film Festival.
