= The Forgotten (2003 film) =

- DVD Cover for The Forgotten
- Directed by: Vincente Stasolla
- Written by: Vincente Stasolla
- Produced by: Henry J. Simonds; Vincente Stasolla; Laura Berning
- Starring: Randy Ryan; David McMahan; Salim Rahman; Stephen Kilcullen; Malcolm Barrett; B. Ouyang; Janan Raouf; the dying soldier portrayed by S. Gregory Rudder
- Cinematography: Learan Kahanov
- Edited by: Joel Hirsch
- Music by: Joel Goodman
- Distributed by: Domestic: Emerging Pictures; International: KOAN, Inc.
- Release dates: November 7, 2003 (Three Rivers Film Festival); September 24, 2004 (United States)
- Running time: 91 minutes
- Country: United States
- Language: English

The Forgotten is a 2003 American Korean War film directed by Vincente Stasolla and starring Randy Ryan. The majority of the film was shot in Pennsylvania. The film chronicles the story of two tanks that get lost behind enemy lines in the beginning of the Korean War. Facing the crew is an inexperienced commander, the mounting tension between a motley assortment of soldiers, and the general confusion of the "forgotten war" itself.

== Plot ==
In October 1950, during a decimating North Korean Army assault, a U.S. Army tank platoon retreats. The remaining two tanks become lost behind enemy lines. Corporal William Byrne, an idealistic, God-fearing young enlistee, becomes the platoon commander after the platoon sergeant dies. Fighting against the unseen enemy and waning esprit de corps, the tanks crisscross the unfamiliar Korean landscape. Death, dissension, and a wounded North Korean PoW test the wills of Cpl. Byrne and crews. Meanwhile, struggling to maintain his faith, Cpl. Byrne escapes the war by remembering his wife and the delusions of his morphine-medicated mind.

== Cast ==
- Randy Ryan – Corp. William Byrne
- David McMahan – Pv. Jake O'Brian
- Salim Rahman – Pvt. Philip Cook
- Stephen Kilcullen – Pvt. George Packs
- Malcolm Barrett – Pvt. Michael Anderson
- B. Ouyang – Jong Soo Kim
- Janan Raouf – Mrs. Elizabeth Byrne
- Christopher Benson Reed – Sgt. Moore

== Awards ==
The Forgotten received several awards, namely "Best Feature" at the Sedona Film Festival, "Grand Jury Selection", and "Best Narrative Feature" at the Artfest Film Festival.

== Production ==
Writer/Producer Vincente Stasolla has stated that there were several reasons for making The Forgotten. One was the importance of shedding light on the Korean War itself. Though historians consider this particular war less understood and less well-remembered than other wars, its cost in human terms is undisputed:

About a million South Korean civilians were killed, and several million were made homeless. More than 560,000 United Nations and South Korean troops and about 1,600,000 communist troops were killed or wounded or were reported missing.

Stasolla had a personal connection with the war, as his uncle had served. And, he was influenced by seminal filmmakers like Samuel Fuller (The Steel Helmet and Fixed Bayonets), who was well known for making limited budget war movies. David Lean (The Bridge Over the River Kwai) and Terrence Malick (The Thin Red Line) also influenced Stasolla.

== See also ==
- List of American films of 2004
- Twist ending
