= Malcolm Barrett (actor) =

American actor (b. 1980)

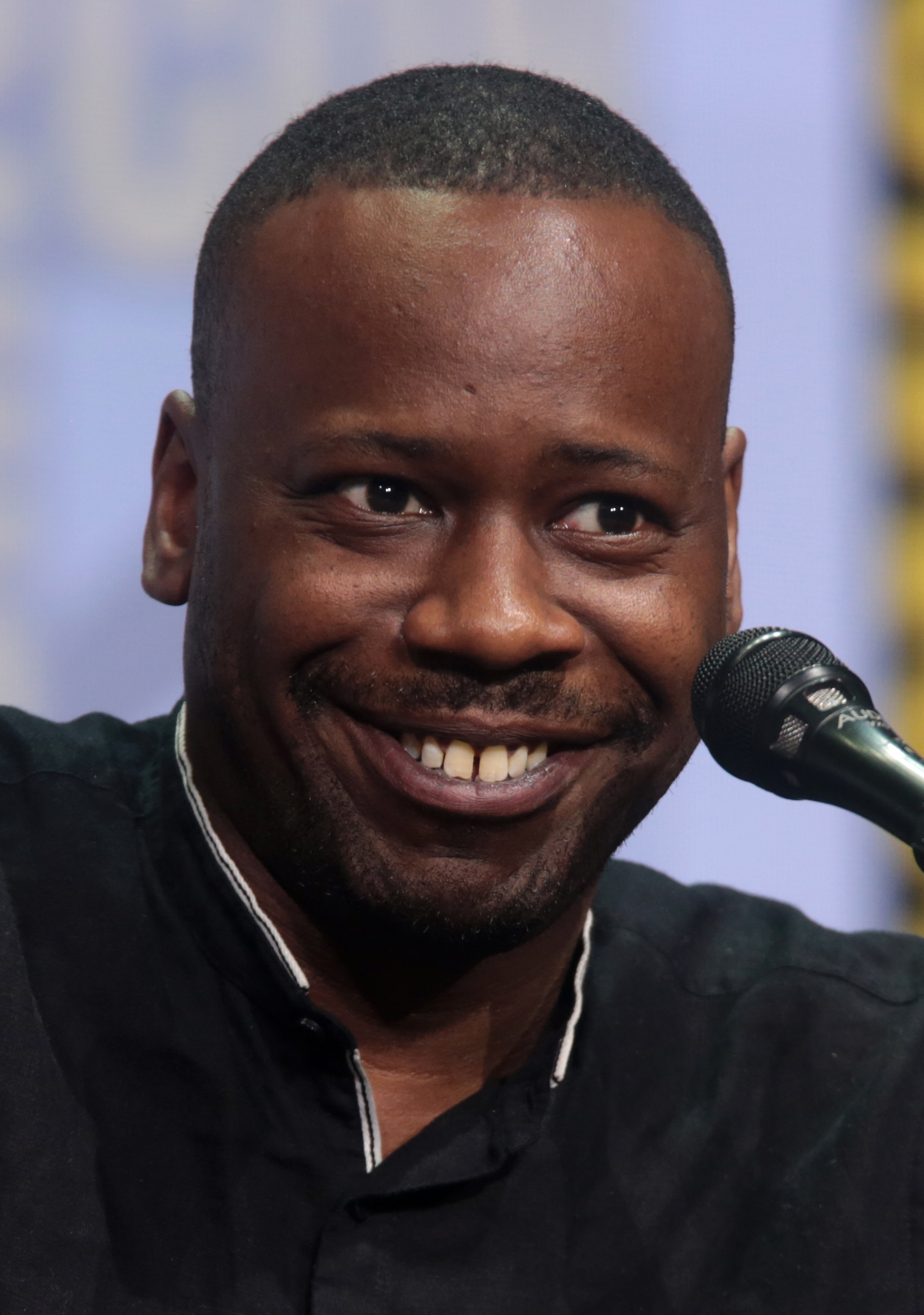
- Barrett at the 2017 San Diego Comic-Con
- Born: April 22, 1980 (age 46); Brooklyn, New York, U.S.
- Education: Stuyvesant High School
- Occupation: Actor
- Years active: 2000–present

Malcolm Barrett (born April 22, 1980) is an American actor best known for playing time traveler Rufus Carlin in Timeless on NBC.

== Early life and education ==
Barrett was born and raised in Brooklyn, New York, and graduated from Stuyvesant High School in Manhattan in 1998 with fellow actors Telly Leung and Billy Eichner.

== Career ==
Barrett has appeared as a series regular on Fox's The Sketch Show and Luis.

Barrett played Dr. Lem Hewitt on the ABC television show, Better Off Ted and was a supporting character in the Academy Award-winning The Hurt Locker.

Barrett has had recurring appearances on the New York-based Law & Order franchise. He was featured in an episode of The Sopranos and guest-starred in season 1, episode 1 of It's Always Sunny in Philadelphia, the series finale of The Office as one of Dunder/Mifflin's new employees, and in an episode of Monk as a lottery fanatic. He also had a small role in the movie Larry Crowne, as a classmate of Tom Hanks' character.

From 2016 to 2018, Barrett played the main role of Rufus Carlin in the NBC series Timeless.

== Filmography ==
=== Film ===
Year	Title	Role
2000	King of the Jungle	Basketball Kid #2
2002	Swimfan	Jock
2003	Rhythm of the Saints	
2003	The Forgotten	Anderson
2007	Love Conquers Al	Al
2008	American Violet	Byron Hill
2008	The Hurt Locker	Sergeant Foster
2008	My Best Friend's Girl	Dwalu
2008	The Highs & Lows of Milo Brown	Milo Brown
2009	Imaginary Larry	Kenneth
2010	Mission: Rebound	Malcolm
2011	Larry Crowne	Dave Mack
2012	Missed Connections	Jules Norris
2013	Tyler Perry Presents Peeples	Chris Walker
2013	Orenthal: The Musical	Lawrence
2013	Peeples	Chris Walker
2014	Dear White People	Helmut West
2014	10.0 Earthquake	Booker
2015	Addicted to Fresno	Eric
2016	War on Everyone	Reggie
2016	Calico Skies	John
2017	Literally, Right Before Aaron	Greg
2020	The Comeback Trail	Xavier Clay
2021	Horror Noire	Dr. Berry

=== Television ===
Year	Title	Role	Notes
2000	The Beat	Russell Lucas	Episode: "Cueca Solo"
2001, 2002	Law & Order	Julian Zalak, Harry Johnson	2 episodes
2002	The Sopranos	Angelo Davis	Episode: "Watching Too Much Television"
2002	Law & Order: Criminal Intent	Ahmal	Episode: "Cuba Libre"
2003	Luis	TK	9 episodes
2004	The Big House	Martin	Episode: "A Friend in Need"
2005	It's Always Sunny in Philadelphia	Terrell Jenkins	Episode: "The Gang Gets Racist"
2005	Ghost Whisperer	Dr. Jules Huffman	Episode: "Voices"
2005	The Sketch Show	Various characters	6 episodes
2007	Side Order of Life	Andy Ryan	
2007	Psych	Wally	Episode: "Zero to Murder in Sixty Seconds"
2008	Monk	Malcolm O'Dwyer	Episode: "Mr. Monk Gets Lotto Fever"
2009	The Movie Loft	Himself	
2009–2010	Better Off Ted	Lem Hewitt	Series regular; 26 episodes
2009	Floored and Lifted	Malcolm	
2010	The Good Guys	A/C	Episode: "Cop Killer"
2011	Southland	Henry Watts	Episode: "Sideways"
2011	Traffic Light	Pete	2 episodes
2011	Raising Hope	Lamar	Episode: "Baby Monitor"
2011	The Mentalist	Officer Price	Episode: "Where In the World Is Carmine O'Brien?"
2011	Other People's Kids	Magnus	Television film
2012	Zombie Murder Explosion Die!	Jack (voice)	2 episodes
2013	Walk This Way	Actor	Episode: "Good Advice"
2013	The Office	Malcolm	Episode: "Finale"
2013	The Soul Man	Bird	3 episodes
2014	Garfunkel & Oates	Daniel	Episode: "The Fadeaway"
2014	Mission Control	Arthur	Television film
2015	Kroll Show	Gigolo	2 episodes
2015	Key & Peele	Harassed passenger	2 episodes
2015	Truth Be Told	Hudson	2 episodes
2016–2018	Timeless	Rufus Carlin	Main cast
2017–2018	Preacher	Hoover	Recurring (Season 2); Main (Season 3)
2017	Dropping the Soap	Josh	2 episodes
2017	Dimension 404	Chris	Episode: "Bob"
2019	Weird City	Chonathan	Episode: "Chonathan & Mulia & Barsley & Phephanie"
2019	Santa Clarita Diet	Morgan	Episode: "The Chicken and the Pear"
2019	The New Negroes	Performer	Episode: "Money"
2019	Our House	Shawn	Unsold pilot
2019–2026	The Boys	Seth Reed	Recurring role
2020	Into the Dark	Derrick	Episode: "Pooka Lives!"
2020	Hot Spot	Matthew	Episode: "I'm a Fox You're a Fox"
2021	Genius	Ted White	8 episodes
2021	Just Beyond	Andy	Episode: "The Treehouse"
2022	Central Park	Landon Volk (voice)	Episode: "B Is for Brandenham"
2023–present	Average Joe	Leon Montgomery	Main cast
2023	History of the World, Part II	Captain Hanks / Idi Amin	2 episodes
2023	The Changeling	Patrice Green	Recurring role
2023	Krapopolis	(voice)	Episode: "Big Man on Hippocampus"
2025	Gen V	Seth Reed	Episode: "Bags"
