= Tre Manchester =

American real estate agent, film writer, director, and producer (born 1992)

- Born: June 12, 1992 (age 33); Springfield, Massachusetts, United States
- Occupations: Real estate agent, writer, director, producer

Tre Manchester (born June 12, 1992) is an American real estate agent, author, director, and producer known for his debut feature film The Things We've Seen.

== Early life ==
Manchester was born in Springfield, Massachusetts, but grew up in Crown Point, Indiana. He attended Crown Point High School, and while there began to write fictional works.

== Film career ==
Manchester formed his production company, Atlas Pictures, in the fall of 2013. Shortly after, he and his team began developing numerous short films, appearing in film festivals around the United States and the world.

Following the successes of his short films, he went on to write his first feature-length screenplay for The Things We've Seen in September 2014. The following year he teamed up with producers Don Bernacky, John Metzler, and Roger Welp to begin filming in the summer in Crown Point, Indiana. A critical success, The Things We've Seen went on to play in twelve film festivals around the world, winning eight awards and securing four nominations. Represented by Crogan Filmworks, the movie went on to be picked up for distribution by Multicom Entertainment Group, Inc. for North American Television and Video-On-Demand distribution. It also gained the same platform release in China via Beijing Spark Future International Culture Communication Co., Ltd.

== Real Estate career ==
Tre is currently a real estate agent at Lively Charleston Properties with Real Brokerage based in Charleston, South Carolina.

== Author ==
While We’re Here is a 2025 coming‑of‑age novel by Tre Manchester, under pen name T.A. Manchester, published by Henry Gray Publishing, based in Granada Hills, California. Set against the backdrop of small‑town America, While We’re Here explores themes of grief, forgiveness, resilience, and the bonds of family. Morgan confronts legacy wounds passed down through generations, learning that healing rarely follows a straight path—and that sometimes the bravest act is simply showing up. Highlighted by critics and early readers as “a deeply emotional journey through grief, forgiveness, resilience, and the unbreakable ties of family,” the novel is described as “Friday Night Lights meets Ordinary People”.

The book is set for release on September 4, 2025, via major book retailers in paperback, hard cover, and e‑book editions.

== Filmography ==
=== Film ===
Year	Title	Role
2012	In Vermilion	Writer, director
2013	To Ride the River	Writer, director
2013	In Divinity	Producer
2014	November Sun	Director
2015	Your Ever After	Writer, director
2015	Fleur	Co-Writer, director
2015	Through the Never	Writer, director
2015	Lost Between	Director
2015	Traveler	Producer
2016	Wait, I'm a Racist?!	Associate Producer
2017	The Things We've Seen	Writer, director, producer
2019	Bleed American	Writer, director, producer

=== Series ===
Year	Title	Role	Notes
2014	Nation Under God	Writer, director	Web-Series
2017	Chicago Press	Writer	

== Awards and accolades ==
- "Best Original Screenplay" – The Things We've Seen | Columbia Gorge International Film Festival
- "Best Feature" – The Things We've Seen | Mediterranean Film Festival
- "Outstanding Achievement Award" – The Things We've Seen | Calcutta International Cult Film Festival
- "Professional Narrative Feature" – The Things We've Seen | George Lindsey UNA Film Festival
- "Best Feature" – The Things We've Seen | MayDay Film Festival
- "Best Actor" – The Things We've Seen | MayDay Film Festival
- "Best Actress" – The Things We've Seen | MayDay Film Festival
- "Gold Remi Award" – The Things We've Seen | 50th Worldfest Houston International Film Festival
- "Audience Choice Award" – A Land Between | International Broke Student Film Festival
- "Audience Choice Award" – In Vermilion | Once A Week Online Film Festival

== Nominations ==
- "Best Picture" – The Things We've Seen | Houston Critic's Choice Society
- "Best Actress" – The Things We've Seen | Houston Critic's Choice Society
- "Best Supporting Actor" – The Things We've Seen | Houston Critic's Choice Society
- "Best Young Performer" – The Things We've Seen | Houston Critic's Choice Society
- "Top 200 Finalist" – Melancholic | HBO Project Greenlight (Presented by Matt Damon & Ben Affleck)
- "Runner-up" – In Vermilion | Yobi.TV Talent Competition
