= Randy Ryan =

American actor

- Born: Henderson, Tennessee, U.S.
- Occupations: Actor, businessman
- Years active: 2005–present

Randy Ryan is an American actor, known for his role in Public Enemies, Salvation Boulevard, Joshua, The Forgotten, 20th Century Women, and The Things We've Seen. His television roles include Sex and the City, Law & Order, Law & Order: Criminal Intent, Third Watch and Medical Investigation.

== Filmography ==
=== Film ===
Year	Title	Role	Notes
2003	The Forgotten	William	
2005	Love, Ludlow	Subway Man	
2007	Joshua	Soccer Dad	
2008	Public Enemies	Agent Julius Rice	
2009	Amanda	Joe Bender	
2011	Salvation Boulevard	Duane	
2016	20th Century Women	Dinner guest	
2017	The Things We've Seen	Rayford Boem	
2018	Any Bullet Will Do	Karl Steadman	
2018	Not Welcome	William	
2020	Kajillionaire	Jimmy Whitacre	

=== Television ===
Year	Title	Role	Notes
2003	Sex and the City	Wayne	1 episode
2005	Third Watch	Richard Rush	1 episode
2005	Medical Investigation	Richard Rush	1 episode
2005	Law & Order: Criminal Intent	Drew Esterhaus	1 episode
2005	Law & Order	Dan Moncreif	1 episode
2012	Dark Wall	Deputy	1 episode
2019	SEAL Team	Homeless Vet	1 episode
