= Emma McDonald =

English actress

- Born: Emma Katherine McDonald; 1993 (age 32–33)
- Education: University of Nottingham
- Years active: 2015–present

Emma Katherine McDonald (born 1993) is an English actress. She began her career in theatre. On television, she is known for her roles in the AMC+ series Moonhaven (2022) and the Starz series The Serpent Queen (2024). Her films include 7 Keys (2024) and Low Rider (2025).

== Early life ==
McDonald grew up around Brixton and Camberwell, South London. McDonald attended St Marylebone School. She was discovered in a school play by Michael Frayn. Before pursuing acting professionally, McDonald graduated with a degree in maths and psychology from the University of Nottingham. During her time at university, she took part in Nottingham New Theatre student productions.

== Career ==
After leaving Nottingham, in 2015, McDonald made her professional stage debut as Georgiana Darcy in Pride and Prejudice at the Crucible Theatre in Sheffield. She then played Hero in the Iris Theatre production of Much Ado About Nothing at St Paul's, Covent Garden in 2016. McDonald joined the Watermill Theatre company, appearing in productions and tours of Romeo and Juliet, Twelfth Night and The Picture of Dorian Gray in 2017, A Midsummer Night's Dream in 2019 and Macbeth in 2020. Also in 2019, McDonald played Anna Lamb in The Sweet Science of Brusing at Wilton's Music Hall.

Amid 2020 and 2021, McDonald starred as Eve opposite May Kelly in the film Get Luke Lowe and appeared in digital productions of The Picture of Dorian Gray alongside Fionn Whitehead and Alfred Enoch and Going the Distance. She made her television debut as Yasmin Hayes in the second series of the Acorn TV series Queens of Mystery.

Announced in 2021, McDonald was cast in her first lead role as Bella Sway in the 2022 AMC+ science fiction series Moonhaven. In 2024, she replaced Sennia Nanua as Rahima in the second season of the Starz historical drama The Serpent Queen. She had a supporting role as Areej in Amrou Al-Kadhi's film Layla and starred as Lena in Joy Wilkinson's 7 Keys and Quinn in Campbell X's Low Rider. McDonald returned to the stage in Foreverland at Southwark Playhouse and the Royal Shakespeare Company production of The Constant Wife.

== Filmography ==
=== Film ===
Year	Title	Role	Notes
2019	Landfall (1734-1987-2018)	Martha York	
2020	Get Luke Lowe	Evelyn "Eve" Brown	
2021	The Everlasting Club		Short film
2022	Here We Are	Mona	Short film
2024	Layla	Areej	
2024	7 Keys	Lena	
2025	Low Rider	Quinn	

=== Television ===
Year	Title	Role	Notes
2021	Queens of Mystery	Yasmin Hayes	2 episodes
2022	Moonhaven	Bella Sway	Main role
2024	The Serpent Queen	Rahima	Main role (season 2)
2025	The Chelsea Detective	Stacey Ford	1 episode
2026	Death in Paradise	Esme LeRoux	Series 15, Episode 7

=== Video game ===
Year	Title	Role	Notes
2026	The Conjuring: Unspoken	Francesca Noakes	Voice and motion capture

== Stage ==
Year	Title	Role	Notes
2015	Pride and Prejudice	Georgiana Darcy	Crucible Theatre, Sheffield
2016	Much Ado About Nothing	Hero	St Paul's, Covent Garden
2017	Romeo and Juliet	Lady Capulet	Watermill Theatre, Newbury / tour
2017	Twelfth Night	Antonia	Watermill Theatre, Newbury / tour
2017	The Picture of Dorian Gray	Dorian Gray	Watermill Theatre, Newbury / tour
2019	The Sweet Science of Bruising	Anna Lamb	Wilton's Music Hall
2019	A Midsummer Night's Dream	Titania	Watermill Theatre / tour
2020	Macbeth	Lady Macbeth	Watermill Theatre / tour
2021	The Picture of Dorian Gray	Sybil Vane	Digital production
2021	Going the Distance	Gail	Digital production
2024	Foreverland		Southwark Playhouse, London
2025	The Constant Wife	Marie-Louise Durham	Swan Theatre, Stratford-upon-Avon
