= Sarah Agha =

British actress, presenter, and writer

- Born: January
- Education: Trinity College Dublin
- Years active: 2013–present
- Website: sarahagha.com

Sarah Agha (born January) is a British actress, presenter, writer, and curator. She founded the Arab Film Club and presented the BBC documentary The Holy Land And Us: Our Untold Stories (2023). She is also known for her roles in the film Layla (2024) and the 5 period drama The Hardacres (2024–).

== Early life ==
Agha is from London and of Irish and Palestinian descent. Her maternal grandmother is from Derry, while her Palestinian father was born in the village of Delhamiya. At 2 years old, his family were displaced to Jordan during the Nakba under the impression it would be temporary and left most of their belongings at their house, not knowing they would be forbidden from returning. After moving to the Golan Heights when he was 8, they were displaced again during the Naksa; her father came to London in his 20s.

Agha attended Catholic school. She joined the National Youth Theatre and took a number of short summer courses with the likes of the New York Film Academy, the Royal Conservatoire of Scotland, and the Central School of Speech and Drama. She studied Theology and Middle Eastern Studies at Trinity College Dublin, graduating in 2014.

== Career ==
After graduating from university, Agha was cast in the Polka Theatre children's production of Operation Magic Carpet and made her television debut with a guest appearance in a season 5 episode of the Showtime thriller series Homeland. She worked as a script supervisor on a number of projects, including the feature films A Christmas Star in 2015 and The Courier in 2019, and assistant produced the 2016 short film Portrait.

Agha also starred in the Edinburgh Fringe Festival productions Deadly Dialogues and The Sleeper in 2017 and 2018 respectively, hosted the comedy night Arabs Are Not Funny! at the Royal Albert Hall, and appeared in an episode of the AMC series Into the Badlands. Also in 2019, Agha worked with the Royal Shakespeare Company and Swan Theatre in Stratford-upon-Avon on A Museum in Baghdad and King John. She began writing articles for 1883 Magazine and Backstage.

Out of the Arab Play Reading Club she joined and curated during the COVID-19 lockdown, Agha co-founded the Arab Film Club. She returned to the stage with Bitterenders at the Arcola Theatre in 2021, followed by Hakawatis at the Sam Wanamaker Playhouse the following year. Agha narrated her first documentaries Atahualpa: Death of the Last Inca Emperor and Inside Britain's Secret Nuclear Bunker.

In 2023, Agha gained recognition when she featured in the BBC Two documentary centred around the Nakba titled The Holy Land And Us: Our Untold Stories opposite Robert Rinder, in which they explore their family histories as a British-Palestinian and a British Jew respectively, as well as the stories of four other families. The documentary was nominated for Best Specialist Factual Programme at the Broadcast Awards. Agha has since contributed to publications such as The New Arab, Middle East Eye, and The Guardian, and appeared on networks such as BBC News.

Agha made her feature film acting debut as Fatima, the titular character's sister, in Amrou Al-Kadhi's Layla, which opened at the 2024 Sundance Film Festival. Later in 2024, she starred in the one woman play A Grain of Sand, written and directed by Elias Matar for the London Palestine Film Festival. She began playing Betsy Temple in the Channel 5 period drama The Hardacres.

== Filmography ==
=== Film ===
Year	Title	Role	Notes
2013	Psychic Sue	Zoe	Short film
2015	Henry Maybury: You're Beautiful	Friend	Short film
2015	A Christmas Star	Script supervisor	
2016	Goodnight Gigi	Script supervisor	Short film
2016	Portrait	Assistant producer	Short film
2017	Nobis	Anu	Short film
2019	Contenders	Script supervisor	Short film
2019	The Amazing World of Emma	Harriet	Short film
2019	The Courier	Script supervisor / 2U	
2022	Rouhi (My Soul)	Aya	Short film
2024	Layla	Fatima	

=== Television ===
Year	Title	Role	Notes
2014	Wannabes	Script supervisor	Television film
2015	Homeland	Shatha Khalil	Episode: "Oriole"
2018	Into the Badlands	Ilya	Episode: "Leopard Snares Rabbit"
2022	Atahualpa: Death of the Last Inca Emperor	Herself – narrator	Documentary
2022	Inside Britain's Secret Nuclear Bunker	Herself – presenter	Documentary
2023	The Holy Land And Us: Our Untold Stories	Herself – presenter	Documentary
2024–present	The Hardacres	Betsy Temple	5 episodes

== Stage ==
Year	Title	Role	Notes
2015	Operation Magic Carpet	Nomi	Polka Theatre, London
2017	Deadly Dialogues	Sayidaa	Edinburgh Fringe Festival / Quilliam tour
2018	Arabs Are Not Funny!	Presenter	Royal Albert Hall, London
2018	The Sleeper	Amena	The Space, London / Edinburgh Fringe Festival
2018	Lady Kay / Toto	King Arthur / Oz	The Scoop, London
2019	A Museum in Baghdad	Nasiya / Sam York understudy	Swan Theatre, Stratford-upon-Avon
2019	King John	Ensemble / Blanche / Earl Essex understudy	Swan Theatre, Stratford-upon-Avon
2021	Bitterenders	Maha	Arcola Theatre, London
2022	Astra	Tiamet	Voice role, Brighton Year-Round Festival
2022	Hakawatis	Cover	Sam Wanamaker Playhouse, London
2023	Nothing on Earth	Dolly Shepherd / Boushra	Pursued by a Bear tour
2024	Romeo and Juliet	Ensemble	Globe Theatre, London
2024	A Grain of Sand	Renad Atallah	Barbican Centre, London

== Audio ==
Year	Title	Role	Notes
2021	The End of the Line	Lina	Podcast series, 1 episode
2022	Tyger	Narrator	Audiobook; novel by S. F. Said
2023	Cry Havoc! Ask Questions Later	Charmian	Podcast series
2023–2024	The Audio Long Read	Reader	The Guardian podcast, 2 episodes

== Awards and nominations ==
Year	Award	Category	Work	Result	Ref.
2021	British Independent Film Festival	Best Supporting Actress	The Amazing World of Emma	Nominated	
2023	British Book Awards	Fiction Audiobook of the Year	Tyger	Nominated	
