= Moonhaven =

American television series

- Genre: Science fiction; Drama; Dystopian
- Created by: Peter Ocko
- Country of origin: United States
- Original language: English
- No. of seasons: 1
- No. of episodes: 6

Production
- Executive producers: Peter Ocko (showrunner); James Flynn; Morgan O'Sullivan; Karen Richards; Deborah Spera; Bridget Savage Cole; Danielle Krudy

Original release
- Network: AMC+
- Release: July 7 – August 4, 2022

Moonhaven is a utopian science fiction television series produced by AMC+ that premiered on July 7, 2022. The series depicts a quasi-utopian community set on a part of the Moon, intended to develop the technical and cultural means to save a ravaged Earth. The first episode begins with a murder, and the one season develops around a pivotal event for this project on the Moon, called the Bridge, when the first generations of Mooners, as the people from this community are called, will go back to Earth to teach the Earthers a way to overcome their ecological and economic crisis.

The series was written and produced by Peter Ocko, and the cast includes Dominic Monaghan, Emma McDonald, Kadeem Hardison, Amara Karan, and Joe Manganiello.

On July 28, 2022, it was reported that the series had been renewed for a second season by AMC+. A few months later, the renewal decision was reversed and the series was canceled.

== Premise ==
The series is set three generations after settlers left a dying Earth to build a 500-square-mile colony on the Moon. Rather than eyeing the lunar surface as a potential Earth replacement, the community of Moonhaven was sent with a powerful artificial intelligence system designed to find solutions for Earth’s problems. As the pilot begins, a younger generation of Moon settlers is on the verge of returning to Earth with what they’ve learned, a last-gasp humanitarian mission.

== Cast ==
- Dominic Monaghan as Paul Serno, a detective in Moonhaven
- Emma McDonald as Bella Sway, an Earth space pilot
- Amara Karan as Indira Mare, Earth's Envoy of the IO
- Ayelet Zurer as Maite Voss, Chair of Moonhaven's leadership council
- Kadeem Hardison as Arlo Noon, a detective in Moonhaven
- Yazzmin Newell as Sonda Crux, Voss' second in command
- Joe Manganiello as Tomm Schultz, Mare's bodyguard
- Elaine Tan as Lone, Paul Serno's wife
- Bamshad Abedi-Amin as Fritz, a fireman and Lone's lover
- Josh Tedeku as Wish Spur, Paul and Lone's water son; a member of circle 6 of the First Wave
- Martha Malone as Elna, Paul and Lone's water daughter
- Adam Isla O'Brien as Strego Nall, a mooner involved in an anti-Bridge insurrectionist group
- Nina Barker-Francis as Chill Spen, Bella's blood sister; murdered by Strego Nall
- Lilit Lesser as Asus, Chill Spen's water sister
- George Georgiou as Jate Mura, a drug smuggler on Earth
- Arthur Lee as Tycho Heller, a councillor overseeing the Bridge
- Amy Ledwidge as Wild Child, an unnamed girl Bella frequently encounters on the fringes of Moonhaven
- Charis Agbonlahor as Loa, Bella Sway and Chill Spen's blood mother; Maite Voss's former girlfriend
- Robyn Holdaway as Blu, an apprentice detective under Paul Serno's supervision
- Seán T. Ó Meallaigh as Sirl, involved in the mooner insurrection
- Helen Roche as Gnoc, Paul Serno's blood mother
- Medivic Bakanababo as Zek, a gazer
- Thom Ashley (as Thom Ashely) as Tello, Blu's father

== Episodes ==
No.	Title	Directed by	Written by	Original release date
1	"The Pilot"	Bridget Savage Cole & Danielle Krudy	Peter Ocko	July 7, 2022
2	"The Detective"	Bridget Savage Cole & Danielle Krudy	Sarah Nolen	July 7, 2022
3	"The Envoy"	Laura Belsey	Brad Caleb Kane	July 14, 2022
4	"Mada"	Laura Belsey	Al Letson	July 21, 2022
5	"Dreadfeel"	David Caffrey	Jim Gavin	July 28, 2022
6	"The Seeker"	David Caffrey	Aalia Brown	August 4, 2022

== Production ==
=== Development ===
In March 2021 AMC Studios opened a writers' room for Peter Ocko's Moonhaven, for the production of material as part of its scripts-to-series model. Dep Spera signed on as executive producer. On May 11, 2021, the series received a greenlight order from AMC.

On July 28, 2022, it was reported that the series had been renewed for a second season by AMC+. On December 3, 2022, it was announced that the second season renewal had been reversed and AMC+ had decided to cancel the series.

=== Casting ===
In July 2021, Dominic Monaghan signed on to star in the series as lead opposite Joe Manganiello, with Emma McDonald announced as to headline the series. Ayelet Zurer was also announced in a key role. Kadeem Hardison was announced as a series regular with Yazzmin Newell also joining the cast as a series regular in September 2021.

== Reception ==
On the review aggregator website Rotten Tomatoes, 67% of 18 critics' reviews are positive, with an average rating of 5.9/10. The website's consensus reads: "Moonhaven's depiction of a utopia is often more goofy than harmonious, although fans of idiosyncratic sci-fi will likely enjoy this trip to the moon." Metacritic, which uses a weighted average, assigned the film a score of 74 out of 100, based on 10 critics, indicating "generally favorable" reviews.
