= Diane (1956 film) =

1956 film by David Miller

- Original film poster
- Directed by: David Miller
- Written by: Christopher Isherwood
- Based on: "Diane de Poitiers" by John Erskine
- Produced by: Edwin H. Knopf
- Starring: Lana Turner; Pedro Armendáriz; Roger Moore; Marisa Pavan; Sir Cedric Hardwicke; Torin Thatcher; Taina Elg; John Lupton; Henry Daniell
- Cinematography: Robert H. Planck
- Edited by: John McSweeney Jr.
- Music by: Miklós Rózsa
- Production company: Metro-Goldwyn-Mayer
- Distributed by: Loew's Inc.
- Release date: January 12, 1956
- Running time: 110 min
- Country: United States
- Budget: $2,660,000
- Box office: $1,232,000

Diane is a 1956 American historical drama film directed by David Miller and produced by Edwin H. Knopf for Metro-Goldwyn-Mayer (MGM). The film is a fictionalized account of the life of Diane de Poitiers, whose married name was the "Countess de Brézé". The film stars Lana Turner as Diane. The supporting cast includes Pedro Armendáriz, Roger Moore, Marisa Pavan, Sir Cedric Hardwicke, Torin Thatcher, Taina Elg, John Lupton, Henry Daniell, Melville Cooper, and an early film appearance by Stuart Whitman. It was Turner's last film under her longtime MGM contract and thus marked another stage in the decline of the studio star system.

== Plot ==
In 16th century France, Diane de Poitiers' estranged husband, the Count de Brézé, is arrested for conspiring with his cousin the Duke of Bourbon against King Francis I. Diane arrives in Francis' palace to plead for her husband's life. Francis sends her away, but decides to hold Diane in the palace until the trial. That same afternoon, Francis and Diane watch Prince Henri, the heir apparent, wrestle a nobleman named Gabriel de Montgomery.

In the royal courtyard, Diane advises Francis that rather than pursue the Duke of Bourbon, he should form an alliance with the House of Medici in Italy, whereby Catherine would marry Henri. Some time later, Louis is found guilty and sentenced to death the next morning. Diane contests her husband's innocence and vows to do anything for his release. Impressed by her devotion, Francis releases Louis and Diane pledges to fulfill a promise.

Diane returns home, where Louis accuses her of adultery. Diane states she has been faithful, but Louis renounces her as his wife. Later that night, Diane is escorted to the palace to fulfill her promise. There, Francis tells Diane that based on her advice, he has arranged for Henri to marry Catherine. He instructs her to tutor Henri in proper etiquette.

Diane instructs Henri on fencing, Italian, and dancing. When Henri's marriage to Catherine is two weeks away, Diane assures Henri that his marriage will bring France peace. Henri, however, tells Diane he is in love with her, but Diane rejects him. On the night of Henri's marriage to Catherine, Diane attends the royal court alone. Later on, Catherine's counselor Gondi tells her that he suspects Henri and Diane are romantically involved. Against Gondi's advice, Catherine asks Diane to be her lady-in-waiting, believing her to be innocent.

To support his claim, Gondi shows Diane her chamber, where she reunites with Henri. Catherine spies through a secret hole and witnesses a romantic liaison. Embittered, Catherine seeks astrologer Ruggieri, who instructs his young acolyte Piero to foretell Catherine's destiny. Through a crystal ball, Piero has visions of Catherine bearing three sons who will rule as kings and foresees Henri, inside a "golden cage," lying dead next to Montgomery.

During a hunt in the woods, Henri is attacked by a wild boar and severely injured. Diane returns to the palace, where she learns Francis has waged war against the Duke of Bourbon. She returns to Louis, who has enlisted in the royal army and apologizes for his accusations.

While Henri recuperates, Francis returns home victorious but severely wounded as he reflects that Louis was killed in battle. On his deathbed, Francis tells Henri and the Dauphin to follow Diane's advice. Francis becomes regent after his father's death; however, weeks later, he is allegedly poisoned by his cupbearer and Henri ascends to the throne as King Henry II. It is later discovered the Medicis and the court of Philip II of Spain conspired to assassinate the Dauphin so they could rule France through Catherine and her future heirs. Catherine pleads her innocence and tells Henri she is pregnant.

Seven years later, Catherine has borne three sons while Diane remains Henri's mistress. During dinner, Henri proclaims Diane as the queen of the next day's tournament, much to Diane's disagreement. That same night, Gondi meets with Count Ridolfi, who has installed a sharp blade inside the lance intended to kill Henri. During the jousting tournament, Henri battles Ridolfi and Montgomery, who wounds Henri in the eye as Piero watches in horror. Catherine orders Diane's arrest, though Henri requests for Diane to be at his bedside.

Before his death, Henri asks Diane to leave the palace to save herself. Montgomery offers to escort Diane into hiding, but Diane fears Catherine's repercussions on those who help her. She bids Montgomery farewell and prepares to face any consequence. Catherine, now ruling as regent for her young son, orders Gondi's arrest due to the Medici conspiracy, but he takes his own life. She banishes Diane to her château, but spares her life in a gesture of mutual respect.

== Cast ==
- Lana Turner as Diane de Poitiers
- Pedro Armendáriz as King Francis I of France
- Roger Moore as Prince Henri (later King Henry II)
- Marisa Pavan as Catherine de' Medici
- Sir Cedric Hardwicke as Ruggieri
- Torin Thatcher as Count de Brézé
- Taina Elg as Alys
- John Lupton as Regnault
- Marc Cavell as Piero
- Henry Daniell as Gondi
- Ronald Green as The Dauphin
- Sean McClory as Count Montgomery
- Geoffrey Toone as Duke of Savoy
- Michael Ansara as Count Ridolfi
- Melville Cooper as Court Physician
- Jamie Farr as Count Ridolfi's Squire

== Production ==
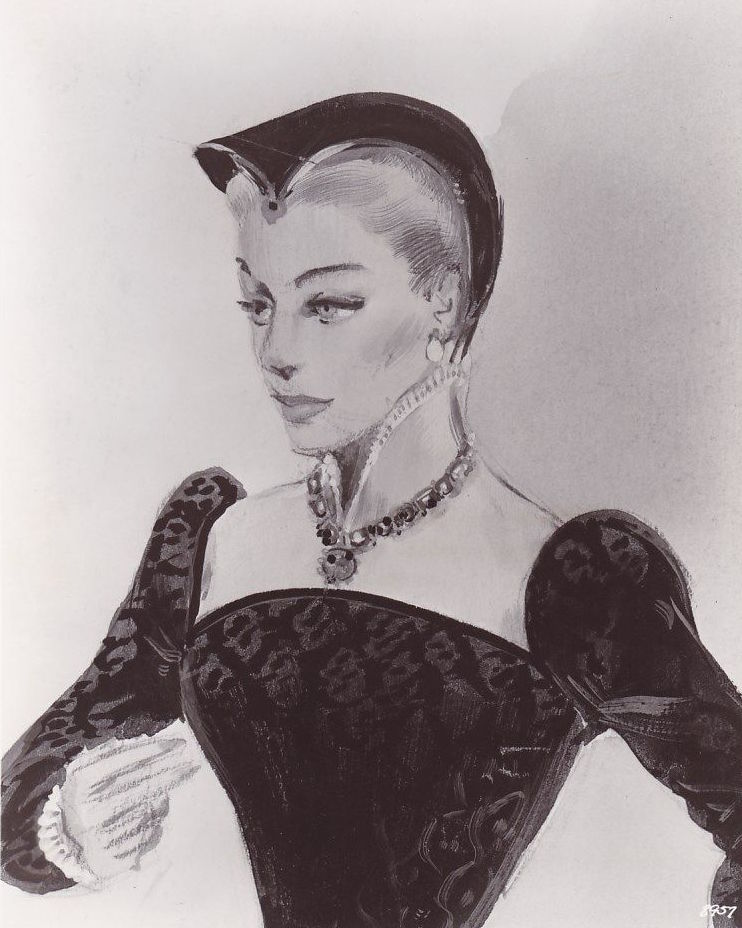
Costume sketch of Turner by Walter Plunkett for Diane

Diane was based on a fifty-page unpublished manuscript called "Diane de Poitiers" by John Erskine, who died in 1951. The film rights were purchased in 1939 by producer Edwin H. Knopf, a former story editor for Samuel Goldwyn. Knopf tried to get financing for the film but was unable.

In 1953, the project was reactivated. Knopf re-secured the film rights from Erskine's estate and took the project to Dore Schary, the head of production at MGM, where Knoft had a deal. Schary agreed to finance. Greer Garson was originally mentioned as a possible lead. Schary also announced he hoped to get Greta Garbo to come out of retirement to play the role. The part eventually went to Lana Turner in the last role of her MGM contract.

Turner said Diane was an interesting woman "one who used her charm intelligently. Actually she was a forerunner of today's modern woman; she was Europe's first outdoor girl, a health fan and an advocate of the cold bath. She wasn't afraid to use her head, but was never caught with her brains showing."

== Home media ==
Diane was released on DVD by Warner Home Video on May 28, 2013 via the Warner Archive DVD-on-demand service.

== Reception ==
=== Box office ===
According to MGM records, Diane earned $461,000 in the US and Canada and $771,000 elsewhere resulting in a loss of $2,660,000.

=== Critical reaction ===
Bosley Crowther of The New York Times wrote: "Although Miss Turner is kept quite busy maintaining her affair of the heart while staying abreast of French court intrigues, Diane is more stately than exciting, more pageant than play. Handsomely mounted and abetted by the fine colors in which it was filmed and, in a few instances, by the sweeping vistas provided by the CinemaScope camera, Diane is, nevertheless, largely peopled by play actors in a drama that rarely moves a viewer."

Whitney Williams of Variety felt Lana Turner was "sympathetic in her role and Roger Moore delivers a good account of himself as Henry". He also complimented the production qualities, writing: "Splendidly caparisoned production-wise in the stunning effects of CinemaScope and Eastman Color, the first half is such old-fashioned costume drama as to draw laughs at unintended places, but picks up interest during the later phases."

Harrison's Reports wrote: "Embellished with lavish production values, CinemaScope and fine Eastman color, this 16th Century romantic costume melodrama is a fairly good, if not outstanding, picture of its kind."

Edwin Schallert of the Los Angeles Times was less impressed with the production and wrote: "The end result of the united efforts is an undramatic sort of costume feature, with a rising and falling interest as it progresses, and very little sympathy engendered for any body, including even the lady of the title."

== See also ==
- List of American films of 1956
