= Cosimo Ruggeri =

Italian astrologer

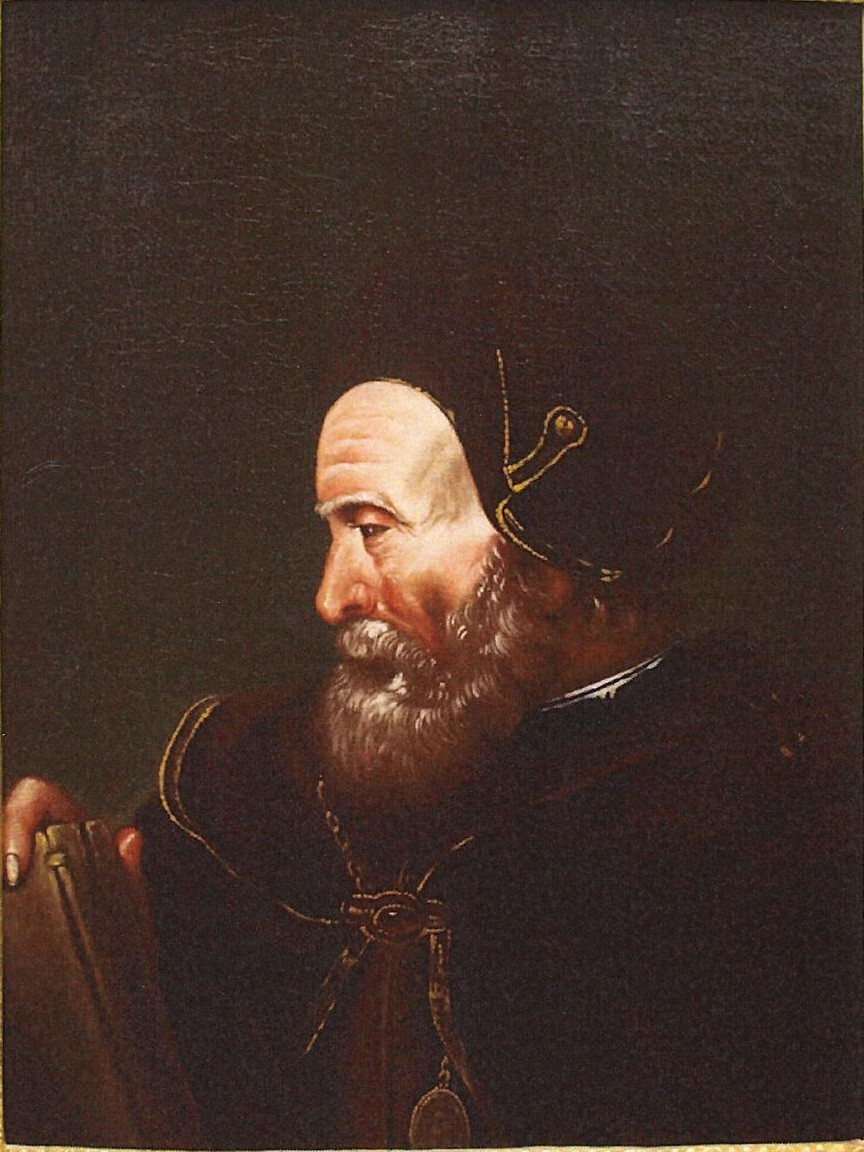
Ruggieri

Cosimo Ruggeri, in France called Côme Ruggieri (died 28 March 1615), was an Italian astrologer, alchemist, haruspex, favourite, and influential adviser of the queen regent of France, Catherine de' Medici. He was the subject of many legends in the folklore of Catherine de' Medici, and reputed as a master of the occult, black magic, and witchcraft during his lifetime.

== Life ==
Cosimo Ruggeri's presence at the French royal court is first attested in 1571. He was a part of the entourage of the Tuscan ambassador to France, Petrucci; known for his scholarly knowledge, he was a tutor of the Italian language to Elisabeth of Austria, Queen of France. After claims of being able to predict the future through his knowledge in astrology, he was no longer well seen by Elisabeth, but reported to have become a favorite of the queen mother, who asked him for advice in matters of state because of his alleged ability to predict the future, and is said to have came to exert influence over her with his alleged occult knowledge in the dark arts.

In 1574, he became implicated in the attempted homicide of Joseph Boniface de La Môle, when he was reputedly hired to bring about the death of Charles IX by the use of sorcery. He was arrested and sentenced to the galleys for complicity. However, the verdict was never made use of, and in 1585, he was also pardoned formally. The reason for this is regarded to have been his relation to the queen mother.

In 1598, he was prosecuted for having manufactured a doll of Henry IV of France with the intent of murder through sorcery, but freed.

During the queenship of Marie de' Medici, he was a personal friend of the queen's favorites Concino Concini and Leonora Dori.

When he died in Paris in 1615, riots broke out because of rumors about magicians caused by his refusal to receive sacrament on his deathbed, which was also the subject of a libel against him, denouncing him as a sorcerer.

== Legends ==
Many famous legends are told about Cosimo Ruggeri, his relation to Catherine de Medici and his alleged knowledge in the occult.

He was summoned by Catherine de Medici after Luca Gaurico, the Bishop of Civita-Ducale, predicted that "St. Gervais shall see you [her] die". Catherine de Medici requested his presence as an entertainer, but also as a consultant due to his knowledge of and experience with the occult. She gave him the Abbey of St. Mahé in Brittany to entice him to stay in her service. The prediction made about Catherine's death was supposedly fulfilled because her attending physician at her deathbed bore the same name.

He allegedly correctly predicted to Catherine de Medici that three of her sons would be kings, and how long they would reign, by the help of an enchanted mirror in the Chaumont-sur-Loire.

== See also ==
- The Serpent Queen
- The Abyss
- Diane (1956)
