= The Hardacres =

British television series

- Genre: Period drama
- Created by: Amy Roberts; Loren McLaughlan
- Based on: Hardacre by C. L. Skelton
- Written by: Amy Roberts; Loren McLaughlan; Emma Reeves; Liz Lake; Sarah-Louise Hawkins; Cara Loftus; C.L. Skelton; Dan Muirden; Susie Conklin
- Directed by: Rachel Carey; Kieron J. Walsh; Stephen Bradley
- Starring: Claire Cooper; Liam McMahon
- Composer: Stephen McKeon
- Country of origin: United Kingdom
- Original language: English
- No. of series: 2
- No. of episodes: 12

Production
- Executive producers: Amy Roberts; Loren McLaughlan; Colin Callender
- Producer: Alex Jones
- Cinematography: JJ Rolfe; Arthur Mulhern
- Running time: 45-47 minutes
- Production companies: Fís Éireann / Screen Ireland; Newgrange Pictures; Red Berry Productions; Playground Entertainment

Original release
- Network: Channel 5 (UK)
- Release: 7 October 2024 – present

The Hardacres is a period drama television series set in Yorkshire, produced in Ireland for Channel 5 and adapted from the novel series by C. L. Skelton. The series was developed by Amy Roberts and Loren McLaughlan. Series one was initially broadcast in 2024, with series two following in 2026.

== Synopsis ==
Beginning in Yorkshire in the 1890s, the series follows the Hardacre family as they rise from poverty to wealth after acquiring a large estate. As they adapt to their new social status, they face family tensions, class divisions, and the expectations of Victorian society.

== Cast ==
=== The Hardacre Family ===
- Claire Cooper as Mary Hardacre, Sam's wife and mother of the Hardacre children
- Liam McMahon as Sam Hardacre, the patriarch of the family and the owner of the fishing company Hardacre & Son
- Adam Little as Joe Hardacre, the eldest son, who works alongside his father in the family business
- Shannon Lavelle as Liza Hardacre, the daughter who struggles to adapt to her family's new place in high society
- Zak Ford-Williams as Harry Hardacre, the youngest son, who dreams of gaining admission to the University of Oxford
- Julie Graham as Ma Hardacre, the strong-willed grandmother who never forgets the family's humble roots

=== The Fitzherbert Family ===
- Holly Sturton as Lady Adella Fitzherbert, daughter of the Fitzherbert family and Liza Hardacre's best friend.
- Cathy Belton as Emma Fitzherbert, Marchioness of York, George's wife and an enemy of the Hardacre family. Lady Emma, who comes from old money and is a relative of the Danish royal family, balks at the idea of having former fish workers as neighbours
- Owen Roe as George Fitzherbert, Marquess of York, Head of the Fitzherbert family and neighbour of the Hardacre family. He does not share his wife's disdain for their nouveau riche neighbours
- Michele Dotrice as Lady Imelda Hansen (season 2), mother of Emma Fitzherbert and a strong opponent to the Hardacre family who seeks to covertly destroy their reputation as she believes they have "risen above their station"

=== Recurring ===
- Ingrid Craigie as Mrs Dryden, the housekeeper of Hardacre Hall. Although they initially have an adversarial relationship, Mrs Dryden and Mary Hardacre come to respect each other as time goes on.
- Mark Doherty as Mr Beesley, butler and main house manager of Hardacre Hall. Beesley is more supportive of his new employers than Mrs Dryden, whom he rebukes for talking ill of them
- Taheen Modak as Callum "Cal" Saunders, the family banker, manager of Hardacre Herring, and friend of the Hardacres, who harbours romantic feelings for Liza though he lacks the courage to tell her
- Sarah Agha as Betsy, who starts in season 1 as a fish cleaner, before becoming Joe's wife and mother of their son Samuel
- Ella Maria Carmen as Maggie, a maid working at Hardacre Hall. In Season 2, Maggie learns how to read at Mary's school with the help of Lady Emma.
- Jack Weise as Jack (season 1; guest season 2), A fisherman who works for Sam
- Chris McHallem as Dr. Mason (season 1; guest season 2), the town doctor who treats Liza in season one after she overdoses on appetite suppressants, and treats Sam in season two when he is struck by Russian flu
- Siobhan O'Kelly as Lena (season 1), fish cleaner and Betsy’s mother, and a close friend of Mary Hardacre.
- Connor Byrne as Victor Ward (season 1), groundskeeper of Hardacre Hall and love interest of Ma Hardacre.
- Conor Deane as Fred Holdsworth (season 1), Sam’s fisherman friend and business partner.
- David Pearse as Mr. Shaw (season 1), the fish company boss where the Hardacres used to work before they became wealthy.
- Denis Grindel as Lord Hugo Bathurst (season 1), the arranged fiancé of Lady Adella who gets into a fight with Joe after he insults Liza during a soirée at the Fitzherberts' home.
- David O'Reilly as Little Pete (season 1), a fisherman and worker in the village
- Edward Mitchell as Arthur Lewis (season 2), Harry Hardacre’s new tutor, whom Harry comes to admire and eventually develops a crush on.
- Niall McNamee as Edward Blackwood (season 2), Liza Hardacre’s love interest
- Paul Tylak as Bartholomew Balfour (season 2), member of the National Vigilance Association who wants to close Mary’s school after Lady Imelda makes a complaint as part of her plot to ruin the Hardacres.

=== Guest ===
- Rosaleen Linehan as the Duchess of Harrogate (season 1), the head of the Ladies' Charitable Circle, whose opinion determines whether the Hardacres are accepted by high society.

== Episodes ==
Series	Episodes	Originally released	
Series	Episodes	First released	Last released
1	6	7 October 2024	11 November 2024
2	6	14 May 2026	18 June 2026

=== Series 1 (2024) ===
No.	Title	Directed by	Written by	Original release date	U.K. viewers (millions)
1	"1.1"	Rachel Carey	Amy Roberts & Loren Mclaughlan	7 October 2024	2.76
Sam (Liam McMahon) and his eldest son Joe (Adam Little) are dockworkers, while Sam's wife Mary (Claire Cooper) and mother-in-law Ma (Julie Graham) gut fish. When Sam suffers an accident, the entire family lose their income and face being rendered homeless. Having heard that the Thornton Hall estate is seeking staff, Mary goes there to ask for work, but is turned away.
2	"1.2"	Rachel Carey	Amy Roberts & Loren Mclaughlan	14 October 2024	2.53
With no other options, Mary undertakes to sell fried herring at the races. After a setback, the stand begins to earn well. With money to spare, they invest, and end up making a fortune. Having heard that Thornton Hall is being sold, the Hardacres buy it and move in, to the chagrin of the head housekeeper, Mrs. Dryden.
3	"1.3"	Rachel Carey	Emma Reeves	21 October 2024	2.39
Liza tries to make amends following her scene at the tea and apologizes to Adella for getting her into trouble. Adella is only too happy to accept Liza's apology especially, as it comes with a request: to teach Liza on how to be a 'proper' lady.
4	"1.4"	Kieron J. Walsh	Liz Lake	28 October 2024	2.27
In the aftermath of the soiree, Mary finds herself snubbed by the charity circle, and Joe turns to Betsy who has long had feelings for him, for comfort. But when news of Adella's engagement causes Joe to doubt the sincerity of his feelings for Betsy, he follows Sam's advice to break up with her, leaving heartbreak in his wake. Sam, meanwhile, rallies the dock workers and impresses them with his profitable introduction of clever efficiencies to the business. But he finds himself outmaneuvered when the board gives him an ultimatum that forces him to go back on his word to the dock workers he had set out to protect. Hating to see his father brought low, Joe makes a difficult decision.
5	"1.5"	Kieron J. Walsh	Amy Roberts & Loren Mclaughlan	4 November 2024	2.19
Betsy confesses to Lena that she's pregnant, and they both confront the Hardacres, who declare that Joe and Betsy shall marry. Her mother having refused to break off her engagement to Hugo, Adella appeals to Joe to accompany her to America. Having discovered what Mrs. Dryden thinks of the Hardacres, Mary fires her.
6	"1.6"	Kieron J. Walsh	Amy Roberts & Loren Mclaughlan	11 November 2024	2.35
After Liza faints from the effects of weight loss pills that Adella gave her, Mary finds the confidence to go to the Fitzherberts' and confronts Emma. Meanwhile Sam's plan pays off at the docks and the family and the workers enjoy a moment of victory. Harry returns home and Sam and Mary are pleased to hear how well he is doing at school. After seeing the family weather this latest storm, Mrs. Dryden wonders if she'd been wrong about them and agrees to oversee Joe and Betsy's wedding.

=== Series 2 (2026) ===
No.	Title	Directed by	Written by	Original release date	U.K. viewers (millions)
7	"2.1"	Rachel Carey	Cara Loftus, Loren Mclaughlan & Amy Roberts	14 May 2026	1.42
It's 1895, and modernity - in the form of electricity and bicycles - appears at Hardacre Hall, as well as formidable new arrival, Lady Imelda Hansen, the mother of neighbour Emma.
8	"2.2"	Rachel Carey	Sarah-Louise Hawkins, Loren Mclaughlan & Amy Roberts	21 May 2026	1.04
Adella becomes increasingly resentful of Liza and plays a cruel prank on her. Imelda seeks to get to know Mary and Ma better and, spotting the gambler in Ma, introduces her to the game of bridge.
9	"2.3"	Rachel Carey	Loren Mclaughlan, Amy Roberts & C.L. Skelton	28 May 2026	1.02
With Sam seriously ill, Mary places the house into quarantine. Imelda sends Emma to help with lessons. Adella spies a romantic moment between Liza and Edward in the woods, leaving her feeling betrayed.
10	"2.4"	Stephen Bradley	Loren Mclaughlan, Amy Roberts & Dan Muirden	4 June 2026	1.09
In gratitude, the Hardacres throw a servants' ball where the staff are guests, waited on by the family. An announcement delights at the party, but a cutting remark leaves Adella hurt.
11	"2.5"	Stephen Bradley	Loren Mclaughlan, Amy Roberts & Cara Loftus	11 June 2026	N/A
Imelda discovers Adella with Harry's incriminating letter. Joe fears he may have made a costly mistake. Imelda invites Ma to partner with her for an important bridge match.
12	"2.6"	Stephen Bradley	Loren Mclaughlan, Amy Roberts & Susie Conklin	18 June 2026	0.92
The Hardacres are horrified when it appears Ma has bet the house and lost. Harry's university news is overshadowed by a new threat from Imelda. Mary receives support from an unlikely ally.

== Production ==
The six-part series adaptation is from Playground Entertainment and helmed by Amy Roberts and Loren McLaughlan. Also writing episodes are Emma Reeves and Liz Lake, while Roberts and McLaughlan are executive producers. Rachel Carey is lead director. Kieron J. Walsh is also slated to direct Episodes 4–6. Alex Jones is producer and it is co-produced by Jackie Larkin.

=== Filming ===
Filming started in Dublin and County Wicklow in Ireland, in 2023. One of the main settings, Hardacre Hall, is actually Cabinteely House in Dublin, while other scenes were shot at places like Powerscourt Estate and Bray Harbour. Filming lasted for four months into February 2024. Filming for the second season officially began in September 2025

=== Casting ===
Announced as leading the cast are Claire Cooper and Liam McMahon as Mary and Sam Hardacre, with their children Joe, Liza and Harry, played by Adam Little, Shannon Lavelle and Zak Ford-Williams. Mary's mother is played by Julie Graham. In the second series, the show introduced Michele Dotrice as Lady Imelda Hansen, Niall McNamee as Edward Blackwood and Edward Mitchell as Arthur Lewis.

=== Authenticity ===
For the second season, Rachel Carey said that historical accuracy was very important during filming. She explained that she wanted the series to feel relevant to the present while still respecting the past, and that she did not want to treat history lightly.Because of this, some real elements of the time are included in the show, such as the effects of the Russian flu, news about the Oscar Wilde scandal, the presence of the National Vigilance Association, and the use of new inventions like the Ouija board and safety bicycles.

== Broadcast ==
Series one was initially broadcast in the UK in October 2024, with series two premiering in May 2026. The programme is also available to stream in the United States and Canada, Spain, Ireland, Portugal, and Australia.

The second season will premiere on 25 October 2026, on Viasat Epic Drama.

== Reception ==
Carol Midgely in The Times described the series as "untaxing, escapist fare". Anita Singh in The Daily Telegraph described it as "an old-fashioned taste of how TV used to be”.On Metacritic, the first season has a score of 58 out of 100 based on four critic reviews, suggesting "mixed or average" reception.

== Awards and nominations ==
Year	Award	Category	Nominee(s)	Result	Ref.
2025	Golden Panda Awards	Best Supporting actress for a Television Series	Shannon Lavelle	Nominated	
2025	Golden Panda Awards	Best Screenplay for a Television Series	Loren Mclaughlan, Amy Roberts	Nominated	
2026	TV Choice Awards	Best New Drama	The Hardacres	Nominated	
