= Christening (The Office) =

- The Office episode
- Episode no.: Season 7 Episode 7
- Directed by: Alex Hardcastle
- Written by: Peter Ocko
- Cinematography by: Matt Sohn
- Editing by: David Rogers
- Production code: 7007
- Original air date: November 4, 2010
- Running time: 22 minutes

Guest appearances
- Linda Purl as Helene Beesly; Zoe Jarman as Carla; Rick Overton as William Beesly; Robert Pine as Gerald Halpert; Bobby Ray Shafer as Bob Vance; Perry Smith as Betsy Halpert; Peggy Stewart as Sylvia

Episode chronology
← Previous "Costume Contest"	Next → "Viewing Party"
- The Office (American season 7)

"Christening" is the seventh episode of the seventh season of the American version of the comedy television series The Office and the show's 133rd episode overall. Written by Peter Ocko and directed by Alex Hardcastle, the episode aired on November 4, 2010 on NBC in the United States. The episode guest stars Linda Purl as Helene Beesly, Rick Overton as William Beesly, Robert Pine as Mr. Halpert, Perry Smith as Betsy Halpert, Bobby Ray Shafer as Bob Vance, and Peggy Stewart as Sylvia.

The series, a mockumentary, depicts the everyday lives of office employees in the Scranton, Pennsylvania, branch of the fictional Dunder Mifflin Paper Company. In the episode, Pam (Jenna Fischer) and Jim Halpert's (John Krasinski) baby, Cece, is christened and Michael Scott (Steve Carell) invites the entire office to celebrate. Michael joins a church group of high school graduates on a mission to Mexico, with Andy Bernard (Ed Helms) following along to impress Erin Hannon (Ellie Kemper).

Since the seventh season of The Office focused on Michael's departure, the producers wanted to showcase the ensemble cast in various episodes; "Christening" dealt with Pam and Jim. The episode was watched by 7.65 million viewers and received a 3.8 rating among adults between the age of 18 and 49, marking a slight drop in the ratings when compared to the previous week. The episode received mixed reviews from critics; while a few enjoyed the episode, several felt that the main story was unfunny and forced.

== Plot ==
Pam and Jim Halpert's daughter Cece is being christened, and Michael Scott has invited all the members of the office to the service, much to their disappointment. However, Michael's joy is soured when he finds out he is not Cece's godfather. During the service, Cece's dress is ruined when Jim changes her diaper. Jim scrambles to replace the gown, and Cece is eventually baptized in an Arcade Fire T-shirt he found in the back of his car. After the service, the minister announces there will be a reception hosted by Jim and Pam, who panic because the reception was for family only and they are not prepared for so many guests. Toby Flenderson hesitates to enter the church throughout the service. He explains that he has a history between himself and God. Finally, Toby enters the church after the ceremony. He looks at the crucifix and asks, "Why you always got to be so mean to me?"

At the reception, food quickly runs out, and Cece goes missing after Jim asks Pam's grandmother Sylvia to watch over her. Angela Martin had been showing a disturbingly intense interest in Cece, so after finding out from guests that Cece was last seen with a "short blond woman", Jim thinks Angela has kidnapped Cece, and calls her out as she is leaving. Kevin Malone attacks Angela's purse, only for Jim to realize that Pam's mother Helene had Cece.

Michael is inspired by the fellow churchgoers and, following inappropriate comments from the rest of the office staff, angrily lashes out at them for being disrespectful. As the church's youth ministry leaves for Mexico to help build a school, Michael decides to go with them. The other employees try to talk him out of it, but Michael refuses. Just before they leave, Andy Bernard boards the bus with him in an attempt to impress his ex-girlfriend Erin Hannon. Both of them, as well as one boy in the Youth Ministry, get cold feet 45 minutes into the trip, and force the bus to stop. They then have Erin drive them home.

== Production ==
The episode was written by Peter Ocko, his first writing credit for The Office since joining the staff in its seventh season as a co-executive producer. It was directed by Alex Hardcastle, the first episode of The Office he directed. Due to the fact that the seventh season of The Office was Carell's last, the writers decided to divide the season into two distinct halves; the first half would "celebrate Carell's finale year and highlight different actors on the show", whereas the second half would focus on his departure and the search for a new manager. As such, "Christening" was written to specifically highlight "potential heirs to the throne", in this case Fischer and Krasinski's characters, Pam and Jim. The episode guest stars Linda Purl as Helene Beesly, Rick Overton as William Beesly, Robert Pine as Mr. Halpert, Perry Smith as Betsy Halpert, Bobby Ray Shafer as Bob Vance, and Peggy Stewart as Sylvia.

Within a week of its airdate the official website of The Office released two deleted scenes. In the first 46-second clip, Angela, Kelly Kapoor (Mindy Kaling), Oscar Martinez (Oscar Nunez), and Ryan Howard (B. J. Novak) discuss their feelings about having children. In the second 75-second clip, Jim asks Michael to take a picture of his family, Jim and Pam complain to the camera about the uninvited guests, and Gabe Lewis (Zach Woods) and Ryan talk about their volunteer past. The season seven DVD contains several more deleted scenes from this episode. Notable cut scenes include Dwight placing his business card in the hymnals in the church, Andy shouting "Beer me a shirt!" as he gets on the bus, and Pam receiving a text from Michael asking for someone to pick him and Andy up in the middle of Jim's toast.

== Cultural references ==
During the cold open, Kelly plays a "your mom" joke on Pam. Michael initially thinks that he is Cece's godfather, and impersonates Marlon Brando's character Don Corleone in the Godfather movies. During this scene, Michael also references Robert De Niro's famous line "You talkin' to me?" from the 1976 film Taxi Driver. Jim wraps Cece in an Arcade Fire shirt, a reference to the Canadian indie rock band. Pam references the miracle of Jesus feeding the multitude, claiming that she and Jim are "gonna need a loaves and fishes kind of miracle to feed" all their guests. Michael defends the churchgoers, and claims that the office members are being catty like the titular antagonists from the 2004 comedy film Mean Girls. Erin listens to A Prairie Home Companion hosted by Garrison Keillor.

== Reception ==
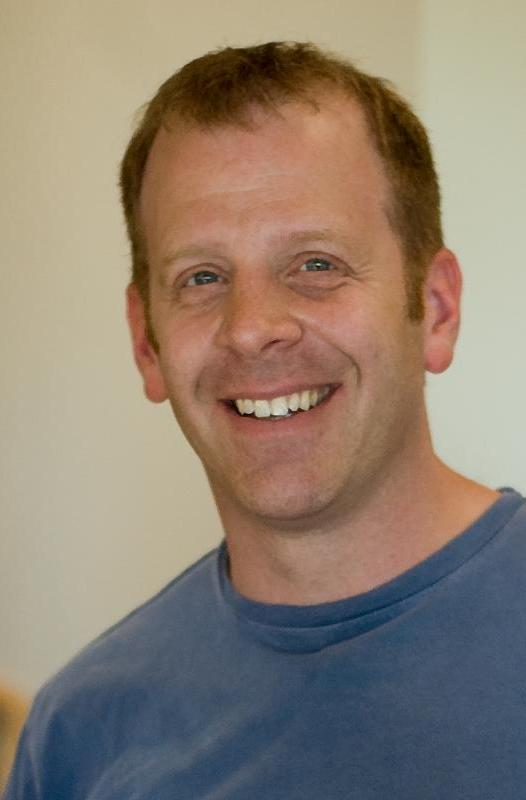
Although many reviews were critical of the episode, Paul Lieberstein's performance was met with praise.

"Christening" first aired on NBC on November 4, 2010. In its original broadcast, it was viewed by an estimated 7.65 million viewers and received a 3.8/10 percent share among adults between the ages of 18 and 49. This means that it was seen by 3.8 percent of all 18- to 49-year-olds, and 10 percent of all 18- to 49-year-olds watching television at the time of the broadcast. This marked a seven percent drop in the ratings from the previous episode, "Costume Contest". "Christening" was the thirteenth most-watched scripted show for the week of broadcast among adults aged 18–49.

The episode received mixed reviews. Myles McNutt of The A.V. Club wrote that his favorite element of the episode concerned Toby and his relationship with God, but he was slightly critical of the "A-story", calling it "inert". Despite this, McNutt felt that the episode portrayed Michael as "a flawed, yet normal, man". He felt that the episode, like the sixth season episode "Scott's Tots", illustrated that Michael was still "searching for his identity despite being over 40". He ultimately gave the episode a "B+". Joel Keller of AOL's TV Squad praised Michael's maturity in the episode, saying "even when we get an episode that didn't quite hit the mark, like last night's, the maturing of Michael still makes the episode interesting to watch."

Margaret Lyons of Entertainment Weekly was more critical, referring to it as "forced, off pitch, and strenuously unfunny". She was also critical of Michael's interaction with the youth group, writing that it "didn't add any development to his character or to the show's broader arcs; it just seemed weird, and not that humorous." Despite this, she praised the cold opening, featuring Pam lecturing the office on proper hygiene. HitFix reviewer Alan Sepinwall called the episode "spectacularly unfunny" and criticized the writers for using Michael's loneliness as a joke instead of taking it seriously like they had in the fourth season episode "Money". He complimented Lieberstein's performance as Toby while he was questioning God.

While reviewing the seventh season, Cindy White of IGN said that the episode seemed to prove that Jim and Pam had never done anything but drag the series down. She wrote that the episode was "one of the worst of the series", with only the sixth season clip show "The Banker" being worse.
