= St Marylebone School =

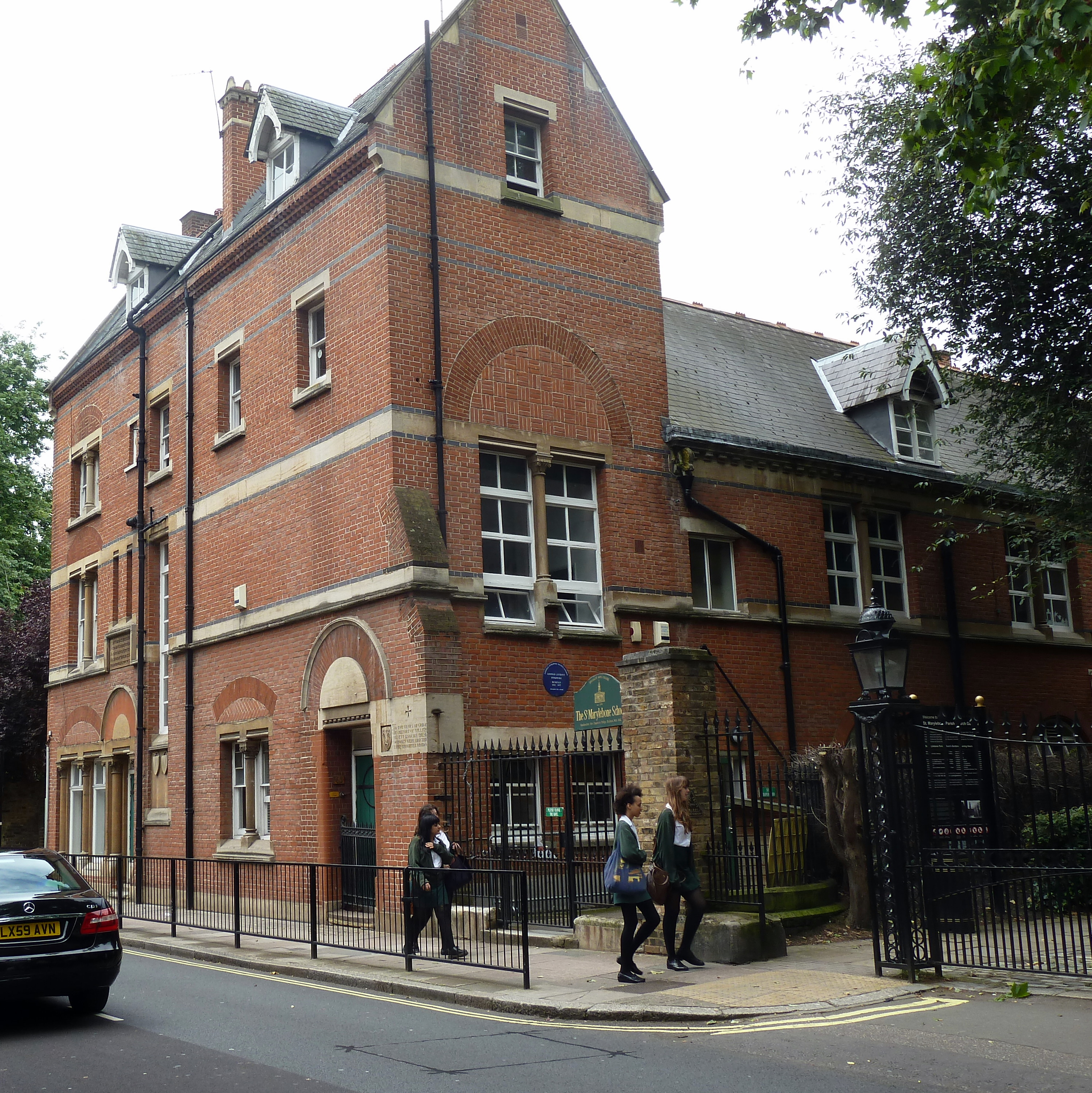

Location
- 64 Marylebone High Street; London, W1U 5BA; England; 51°31′20″N 0°09′06″W

Information
- Type: Academy; Comprehensive school
- Motto: "An Opportunity To Excel"
- Religious affiliation: Church of England
- Established: 1791; 235 years ago
- Department for Education URN: 137353 Tables
- Ofsted: Reports
- Head teacher: Kathryn Pugh
- Gender: Girls; Coeducational (Sixth Form)
- Age: 11 to 18
- Houses: Dove, Barret, Hardwick, Nightingale, Wesley, Ada
- Publication: Ad Astra
- Website: http://www.stmaryleboneschool.com/

Saint Marylebone School is a comprehensive secondary school in Marylebone, London. It specialises in Performing Arts, General Arts, Maths & Computing. In the sixth form, boys can attend as well. The school then became a converter academy, having previously been judged as "outstanding in every respect" by Ofsted.

Founded in 1791, Saint Marylebone Church of England School is now a multi-faith comprehensive school. The main site is located just behind St Marylebone Parish Church, with the Sixth Form Centre based in another building nearby at Blandford Street.

== History ==
The St Marylebone School began as the Marylebone "Day School of Industry," founded in 1791 in what was then Paradise Street, now Moxon Street, to educate the children of the poor in the parish. Boys and girls were taught skills such as needlework and straw plaiting. The school was funded by donations, charity sermons and income from the children's handiwork. In 1808, with the support of local philanthropist and social reformer Sir Thomas Bernard, the school moved to 82 Marylebone High Street, which is now a boutique store. Subsequently, to make room for growing numbers, it moved to a site on Paddington Street, which is identifiable today as a Mission Church. Then in 1858 the 5th Duke of Portland bought a plot of ground near the top of Marylebone High Street and covenanted the site to be used for a girls' school in perpetuity. The main site of the school has been there ever since.

The Day British School of Industry had been incorporated with Sir Thomas Bernard's school under the direction of the Governor of the Church of England's United National Schools. In 1858, it became known as Central National School, to distinguish it from the Eastern (now All Souls CE Primary) and Western National Schools (now St Mary's Bryanston Square CE Primary) founded in 1824 at nearby parishes.

The boys' section was eventually closed in November 2022 and it became a girls' school, adopting its current name. In the 1960s-70s the school used a building in Penfold Street, about 15 minutes from the main site, for domestic science lessons; this building is now used by the Westminster Youth Service. In 2005, the sixth form moved to part of a building that had housed a convent; in 2008-9 this was demolished and rebuilt as a five-story, university-style Sixth Form Centre.

During the school's grant-maintained period, it was highly selective and the school used to interview parents and prospective pupils.

Between 2005 and 2010, the main site saw extensive building and refurbishment work. Major new facilities were opened in 2007, including a below-ground gymnasium and dance studios as well as a music recording studio space and a three-story visual and performing arts space. Since 2013, the school's studio has been the main filming spot for Spirit Young Performers Company. Popular videos shot at this location include "Little Miss High and Mighty" and "Hard Knock Life".

== Houses and local connections ==
Historically, the school had four houses - Dickens, Barret, Hardwick and Wesley. In September 2010, a fifth house, Nightingale, was added and, in September 2017, a sixth house was named after Ada Lovelace. The houses are named after these significant people as they have had some kind of connection with the school (e.g. Thomas Hardwick designed the St Marylebone Church). Dickens's house has been renamed 'Dove' after Evelyn Dove who studied at the Royal Academy of Music which is located close to the school. The houses have the following colours: blue (Barret), yellow (Dove), red (Hardwick), green (Wesley), purple (Nightingale) and orange (Ada). When joining the school, pupils are assigned to one of the houses.

== Academics ==
It was designated a Specialist Arts College by the DfES in 1998, gaining a second specialism as a Mathematics and Computing College in 2006. The school offers a huge range of enrichment activities across the performing arts, and in 2012 was accredited a Gold Standard Arts Mark for the third time in succession. St Marylebone is also a Woodard School, part of a small family of state and independent church schools which prioritise pastoral care with academic excellence.

From a failing school with only 26% of students achieving 5 A*-C GCSE grades, St Marylebone become the most improved school in 2007 as the percentage of *A-C GCSE grades rose to over 90% where it remained for ten years. The school states outstanding teaching is seen as the foundation of the school’s success. The school was named by the Mayor of London as the first in its group of 56 similar schools and a member of the Mayor’s Gold Club. St Marylebone is now one of the outstanding academies, one of the original 100 teaching schools and has opened a free special school meeting the needs of pupils with speech language and communication needs. Mrs Phillips, who is a National Leader of Education, was appointed executive head teacher of the St Marylebone Academies Trust in 2010 and was chair of the Westminster Secondary Heads Forum, representing secondary headteachers on the 14-19 Executive Board.

At the latest Ofsted inspection, St Marylebone was judged "outstanding in every respect". In 2013, exam results were the best in Westminster and the school topped the DfE League Table comparing all schools nationally with a similar intake. For the 11th year running, well over 90% of GCSE entries received A*-C grades and more than half received A* or A. St Marylebone is one of the most oversubscribed schools in London; in 2013, almost 7 students applied for each of the places available in Year 7. It is the top non-selective school in London.

In September 2013, St Marylebone School opened an affiliate school, The St Marylebone Bridge School. The Bridge School is a co-educational Free Special School providing "an innovative education to students with statements for Speech, Language and Communication". As part of the Teaching School Alliance, St Marylebone School is working with various partners to support the development of other schools in London, including the expansion of St Mary and St John's Primary School in Hendon into a through-school from nursery through to sixth form. The former headteacher Elizabeth Phillips advised on the bid to establish a new free secondary school for boys in Marylebone, the Marylebone Academy, which opened in 2014. The new school will receive support and guidance from St Marylebone through the Teaching School Alliance.

== Headteachers ==
From 1993 to 2013, the headteacher of St Marylebone School was Elizabeth Phillips, OBE. The new headteacher is Kathryn Pugh, who took over in January 2014.

== Notable former pupils ==
- Lily Cole, model and actress
- Amelia Dimoldenberg, comedian and YouTube personality
- Theo Ellis, bass player in Wolf Alice
- Naomie Harris, actress
- Layla Kayleigh, actress and TV personality
- Hamilton MacCarthy, sculptor
- Emma McDonald, actress
- Rina Sawayama, musician and model
- Marion St John Webb, author
- Scarlett Mew Jensen, Team GB diver and Paris 2024 bronze medallist
