= Claire Cooper =

British actress (b. 1980)

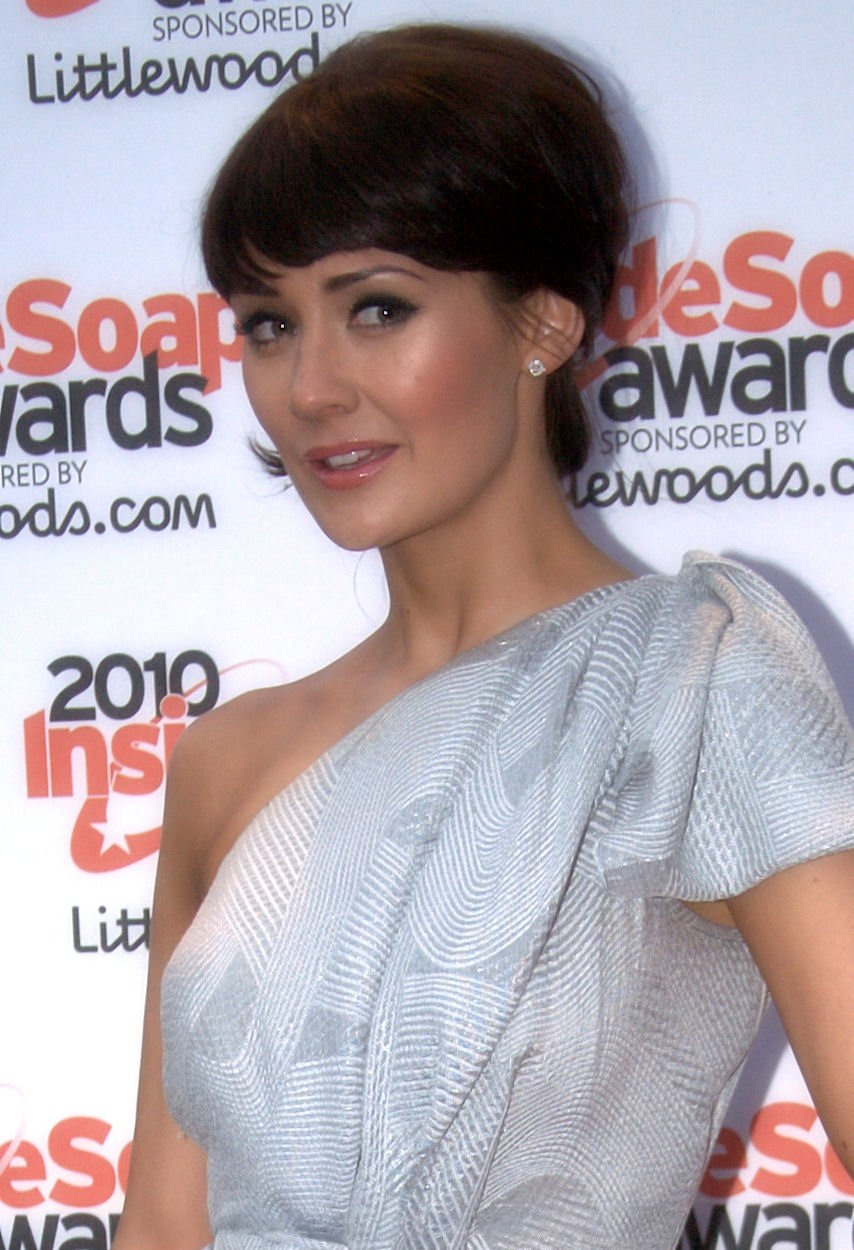
- Cooper in 2010
- Born: Claire Elizabeth Cooper; 26 October 1980 (age 45); Wakefield, England, United Kingdom
- Education: Guildford School of Acting
- Occupations: Actress; gymnast
- Years active: 1999–present
- Known for: Role of Jacqui McQueen in Hollyoaks
- Spouse: Emmett J. Scanlan (m. 2015)
- Children: 2

Claire Elizabeth Cooper (born 26 October 1980) is a British actress and former gymnast from Wakefield, England, best known for portraying Jacqui McQueen in the Channel 4 soap opera Hollyoaks, a character she played full time from 2006 to 2013 and returned to for one episode in 2023.

In 2010, Cooper opened a clothing rental boutique called The Closet in Liverpool with Hollyoaks co-stars Jennifer Metcalfe and Leah Hackett.

Since 2024, Cooper has played the lead role of Mary Hardacre in the Channel 5 period drama The Hardacres.

== Early life ==
Cooper was a British champion gymnast for 10 years.

Cooper attended the Guildford School of Acting.

== Career ==
Cooper has appeared in various British television shows, including a two-part episode on Waking the Dead in 2004. She has also made appearances on Coronation Street and Waterloo Road.

Cooper made her on-screen debut as Jacqui McQueen in Hollyoaks in September 2006. She played the character for several years, including in spin-offs Hollyoaks Later in 2009 and Hollyoaks: King of Hearts in 2010. She departed from the cast in 2013, but made a cameo appearance in an episode in 2023.

In 2016, Cooper played the part of Claire in the second series of In the Club. Cooper co-owns clothing rental boutique The Closet in Liverpool with Hollyoaks co-stars Jennifer Metcalfe and Leah Hackett.

== Personal life ==
Cooper married Hollyoaks co-star Emmett J. Scanlan in 2015. On 8 May 2020, she announced she was pregnant with their first child. On 18 July, she gave birth to a boy named Ocean. On 12 November 2022, she gave birth to their second child, a daughter named Fiáin.

== Filmography ==
Year	Title	Role	Notes
1999	Red Dwarf	50s woman /(uncredited)	Series 8: Episode 5
2004	Waking The Dead	Audrey Clayton	Series 4: Episodes 1 and 2
2006	Waterloo Road	Zoe Ramsden	Series 1: Episode 3
2006	Coronation Street	Anya Spader	Series 47: Episode 161
2007–2013, 2023	Hollyoaks	Jacqui McQueen	Series regular, 529 episodes
2007	Most Haunted	Herself	Episode - Most Haunted Live at Halloween: Tatton Park
2008	All Star Family Fortunes	Herself	Episode – Hollyoaks vs Emmerdale
2008	This Morning	Herself	Series 20: Episode 4900
2008	Big Brother's Big Mouth	Herself	Series 10: Episode 2
2008	The Hollyoaks Music Show	Jacqui McQueen	Series 13: Episode 60
2008	Big Brother: Celebrity Hijack	Celebrity HiJacker /Herself	Series 1: Episodes 22 and 23
2009	Hollyoaks Later	Jacqui McQueen	Series 2: Episodes 1–5
2009	Strictly Come Dancing	Herself	Round 6
2009	Ready, Steady, Cook	Herself	Series 20: Episode 9
2010	Derren Brown Investigates	Herself	Episode - The Man Who Contacts The Dead
2010	Hollyoaks: King of Hearts	Jacqui McQueen	Late night special one-off episode
2011	Hollyoaks Best Bits 2011	Herself	Television film
2014	From There to Here	Matilda	Two episodes
2014	Scott & Bailey	Jenny Redhead	Series 4: Episode 5
2015	A.D. The Bible Continues	Herodias	Six episodes
2016	In the Club	Claire	Series 2
2016	Six Wives with Lucy Worsley	Anne Boleyn	Two episodes
2017	12 Monkeys	Eliza	1 episode
2017	Still Star-Crossed	Tessa Montague	3 episodes
2017	Love, Lies & Records	Sarah	1 episode
2017-2018	Snatch	Miss Teri Dwyer	8 episodes
2019	Knightfall	Sister Anne	Series 2
2019	London Kills	Gloria Tanner	1 episode
2020	Strike Back	Amy McAllister	Series 8: Episode 6
2022	The Peripheral	Dominika Zubov	Co-Starring
2022	The Witcher: Blood Origin	Elfyn Woman	1 episode
2023	The Continental: From the World of John Wick	Rosalind Davenport	1 episode
2024-present	The Hardacres	Mary Hardacre	Main lead; 12 episodes
2025	Sanctuary: A Witch's Tale	Angela Otis	6 episodes

== Awards and nominations ==
Cooper won Best Actress at British Soap Awards in 2013 and Best Family at Inside Soap Awards in 2009. She has also received several nominations:

Year	Award	Category	Role / Character	Result	Ref.
2007	Inside Soap Awards	Best Actress	Hollyoaks / Jacqui McQueen	Longlisted	
2008	TV Now Awards	Favourite Soap Couple	Hollyoaks / Jacqui McQueen	Nominated	
2009	Inside Soap Awards	Best Actress	Hollyoaks / Jacqui McQueen	Longlisted	
2010	Inside Soap Awards	Best Actress	Hollyoaks / Jacqui McQueen	Longlisted	
2011	National Television Awards	Best Serial Drama Performance	Hollyoaks / Jacqui McQueen	Longlisted	
2011	All About Soap Awards	Best Actress	Hollyoaks / Jacqui McQueen	Nominated	
2011	British Soap Awards	Best Actress	Hollyoaks / Jacqui McQueen	Shortlisted	
2011	British Soap Awards	Best Dramatical Performance	Hollyoaks / Jacqui McQueen	Nominated	
2011	TV Choice Awards	Best Soap Actress	Hollyoaks / Jacqui McQueen	Longlisted	
2011	Inside Soap Awards	Best Actress	Hollyoaks / Jacqui McQueen	Shortlisted	
2011	Inside Soap Awards	Best Dramatical Performance	Hollyoaks / Jacqui McQueen	Longlisted	
2011	Inside Soap Awards	Best Wedding	Hollyoaks / Jacqui McQueen	Longlisted	
2011	RTS North West Awards	Best Performance in a Continuing Drama	Hollyoaks / Jacqui McQueen	Nominated	
2012	National Television Awards	Outstanding Serial Drama Performance	Hollyoaks / Jacqui McQueen	Longlisted	
2012	All About Soap Awards	Best Actress	Hollyoaks / Jacqui McQueen	Nominated	
2012	Digital Spy Awards	Best Female Soap Actor	Hollyoaks / Jacqui McQueen	Nominated	
2013	British Soap Awards	Best Actress	Hollyoaks / Jacqui McQueen	Won	
2013	British Soap Awards	Best Dramatic Performance	Hollyoaks / Jacqui McQueen	Nominated	
2013	TV Choice Awards	Best Actress	Hollyoaks / Jacqui McQueen	Shortlisted	
