= Layla (film) =

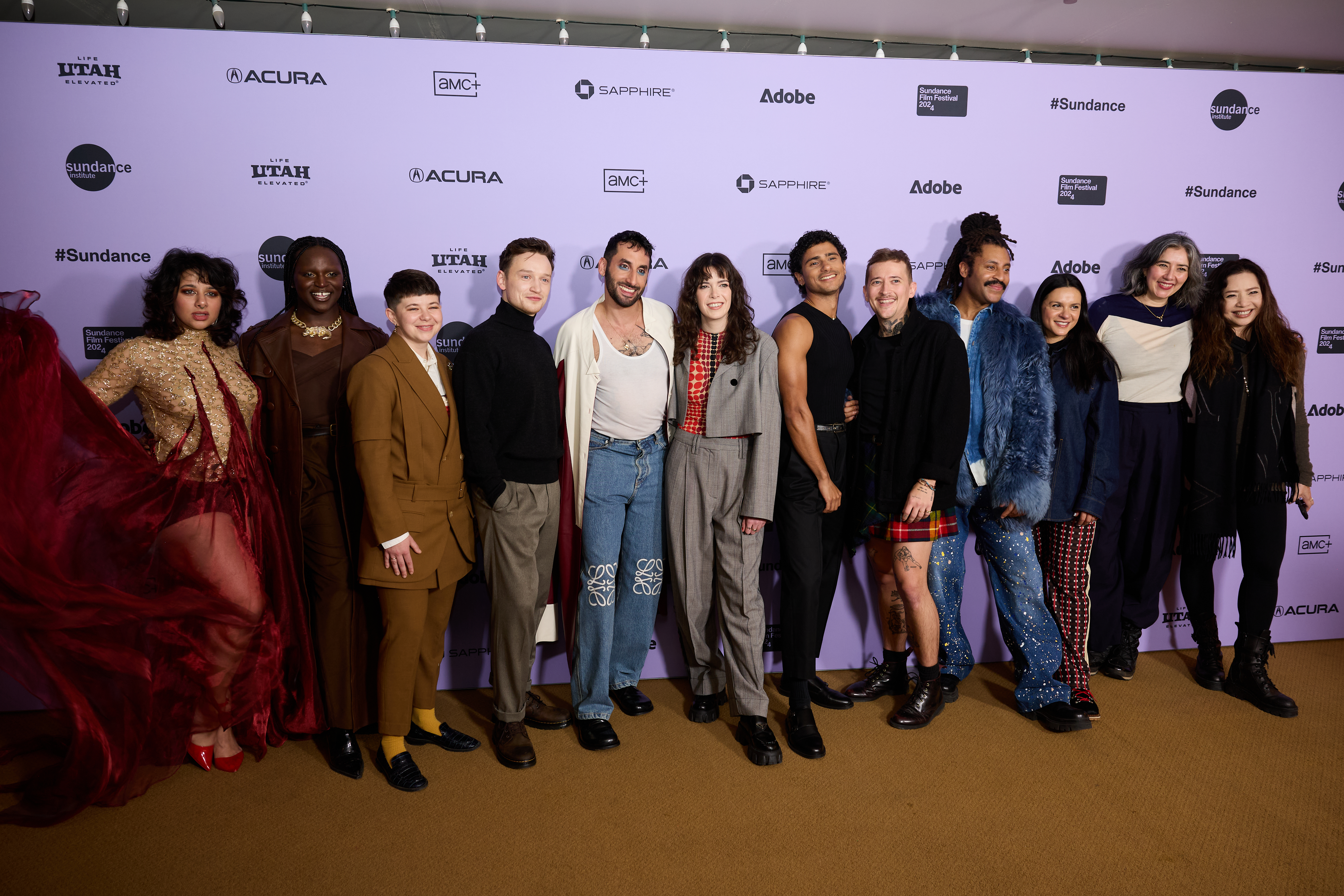
- Cast and crew at the 2024 Sundance Film Festival
- Directed by: Amrou Al-Kadhi
- Written by: Amrou Al-Kadhi
- Produced by: Savannah James-Bayly
- Cinematography: Craig Dean Devine
- Edited by: Fiona Brands
- Music by: CJ Mirra
- Production companies: BFI; Film4; Fox Cub Films; Significant Productions
- Release date: 18 January 2024 (Sundance)
- Running time: 99 minutes
- Country: United Kingdom
- Language: English

Layla is a 2024 British romance film written and directed by Amrou Al-Kadhi in their feature directorial debut.

== Premise ==
While navigating their identity around friends and family, Layla, a non-binary British-Palestinian drag queen living in London, falls in love with Max, an advertising executive.

== Cast ==
- Bilal Hasna as Layla
- Louis Greatorex as Max
- Safiyya Ingar as Princy
- Terique Jarrett as Felix
- Darkwah as Lucilla
- Sarah Agha as Fatima
- Baby
- Rebecca Lucy Taylor as Emily
- Buket Kömür as Sara
- Emma McDonald as Areej
- Ghazi Al Ruffai as Travis

== Production ==
Savannah James-Bayly produced the film for Fox Cub Films. Executive producers include Farhana Bhula of Film4, Kristin Irving of BFI, Mary Burke of Public Dreams, and Nina Yang Bongiovi and Forest Whitaker of Significant Productions. Principal photography took place in East London over six weeks and wrapped in December 2022.

== Release ==
Film4 holds the UK and Ireland TV distribution rights. A first look image was shared in December 2022. Layla was selected by the BFI and British Council for the Great8 showcase at the 2023 Cannes Marché.

The film premiered in the World Cinema Dramatic Competition at the 2024 Sundance Film Festival.

== Reception ==
On review aggregator Rotten Tomatoes, the film holds a 88% "Fresh" score, based on 25 critic reviews with an average rating of 6.5/10. Fionnuala Halligan of Screen International wrote, "At times, Al-Khadi’s film feels like a torrent of pent-up expression, yet more often reads as a tender yearning." Ryan Lattanzio of IndieWire wrote, "An exuberant appreciation of queer life even as it skims the surface of weightier issues around identity. But even the most callous of hearts will find it hard to skirt the charms of this sensitive, well-acted, and confidently shot feature." In a negative review, Kevin Maher of The Times wrote, "It’s a bland, flip-flopping central romance, topped off with some sub-Oprah sentiment about self-empowerment."
