= 3 lbs =

2006 American medical drama TV series

- Genre: Medical drama
- Created by: Peter Ocko
- Starring: Stanley Tucci; Mark Feuerstein; Indira Varma; Tamara Taylor; Armando Riesco; Zabryna Guevara; Griffin Dunne; Juliette Goglia
- Composer: James S. Levine
- Country of origin: United States
- Original language: English
- No. of seasons: 1
- No. of episodes: 8 (5 unaired - released the following year on BBC)

Production
- Executive producers: Peter Ocko; Scott Kaufer; Davis Guggenheim
- Running time: 60 minutes
- Production companies: Ocko & Company; CBS Paramount Network Television

Original release
- Network: CBS
- Release: November 14 – November 28, 2006

3 lbs (pronounced "three pounds") is an American medical drama television series created by Peter Ocko, that aired on CBS from November 14, to November 28, 2006, replacing the cancelled series Smith. The show itself was then canceled three weeks later due to poor ratings. The remaining 5 episodes were aired on the BBC in the United Kingdom in 2007, followed on the Universal HD channel in the United States in 2008.

The title refers to the fact that the average human brain weighs approximately three pounds. The show follows the medical careers of prominent brain surgeon Doctor Douglas Hanson (played by Stanley Tucci) and his protégé, Jonathan Seger.

The show was promoted as "the next great medical drama." The theme song is "Calling All Angels" by Train. Eight episodes were made, and the five episodes that did not originally air in the United States are available on Amazon Prime.

The original pilot was filmed with Dylan McDermott as Dr. Doug Hanson and Reiko Aylesworth as Dr. Adrienne Holland. When that pilot went unsold, it was discarded and the roles were recast. The series then filmed in New York City, at the request of Tucci, who did not want to be away from home during production.

== Main cast ==
- Stanley Tucci as Dr. Douglas Hanson
- Mark Feuerstein as Dr. Jonathan Seger
- Indira Varma as Dr. Adrienne Holland
- Armando Riesco as Dr. Thomas Flores
- Zabryna Guevara as Melania Ortiz
- Griffin Dunne as Jeffrey Coles
- Juliette Goglia as Erica Lund
- Tamara Taylor as Della

== Episodes ==
No.	Title	Directed by	Written by	U.S. air date	UK air date	US viewers (millions)	UK order
1	"Lost For Words"	Davis Guggenheim	Peter Ocko	November 14, 2006 (CBS)	March 11, 2007	9.86	001
After a teen collapses while playing violin in a concert, it's discovered she has a tumor. Dr. Hanson want to operate on the young girl's brain, but the girl's mother isn't sure that is best since she recently suffered a loss of another daughter during an operation. Meanwhile, Hanson's protégé, Dr. Jonathan Seger arrives.
2	"Of Two Minds"	Arlene Sanford	Davey Holmes	November 21, 2006 (CBS)	March 25, 2007	9.21	003
Hanson and his staff deal with a pregnant woman who has a brain tumor. Hanson wants her to follow a treatment plan that threatens the life of her unborn child, but the patient is determined to keep her baby. Although she refuses the radiation, she agrees to a complicated brain surgery that could buy her some time. After the surgery, she discovers some unexpected side effects. Meanwhile, Dr. Seger discovers he is involved with the attorney of a man he's treating who has been accused of a violent crime.
3	"Heart-Stopping"	John David Coles	Scott Kaufer	November 28, 2006 (CBS)	April 15, 2007	7.97	005
A woman that three years ago Hanson operated for an aneurysm returns complaining of double vision. After making some test, they find that she has another aneurysm that her chance of surviving surgery is approximately 20%. But when she agrees to surgery, her brother is determined to stop her and at the same time risking her life. Meanwhile, Adrianne falls for an astronomy professor who suffers from face blindness.
4	"Disarming"	Nicole Kassell	Peter Ocko	October 10, 2008 (Universal HD)	March 18, 2007	N/A	002
A soldier who was wounded in Iraq by shrapnel to his head suffers a stroke, which leads to paralysis in his left arm. Even worse, the man believes the arm doesn't belong to him but rather to a fellow soldier who died. Also, a woman is diagnosed with a so-called joking disease caused by a tumor that makes her lose memory and find most things humorous.
5	"The God Spot"	John Fortenberry	Jessica Ball	October 17, 2008 (Universal HD)	April 1, 2007	N/A	004
When Erica Lund's seizures become more severe, Dr. Hanson suggests surgery, but she adamantly refuses because she doesn't want to lose the euphoric moment before the seizure hits when she sees God. Meantime, another patient is being treated for a traumatic head wound that causes him to blurt out his most intimate thoughts.
6	"Bad Boys"	Sanford Bookstaver	Peter Ocko	October 24, 2008 (Universal HD)	April 22, 2007	N/A	006
A young man has a motorcycle accident, and goes into a coma. After a round of tests it is discovered that he is responsive to the sound of his girlfriend's voice.
7	"The Cutting Edge"	Ken Girotti	Matt McGuinness	October 31, 2008 (Universal HD)	April 29, 2007	N/A	007
A woman thinks she is pregnant, but we find out it is a pituitary tumor. She has had an affair with a younger man, and he wants to stick by her.
8	"Plugged In"	Ken Girotti	Davey Holmes	November 7, 2008 (Universal HD)	June 3, 2007	N/A	008
Hanson decides to do an avant-garde procedure on a man who suffers from severe clinical depression which cannot be cured with medication.
