= Hunger (2008 film) =

- UK release poster
- Directed by: Steve McQueen
- Written by: Enda Walsh; Steve McQueen
- Produced by: Laura Hastings-Smith; Robin Gutch
- Starring: Michael Fassbender; Liam Cunningham
- Cinematography: Sean Bobbitt
- Edited by: Joe Walker
- Music by: David Holmes; Leo Abrahams
- Production companies: Film4; Channel 4 Northern Ireland Screen; Broadcasting Commission of Ireland; Wales Creative IP Fund
- Distributed by: Pathé Distribution
- Release dates: 15 May 2008 (Cannes Film Festival); 31 October 2008 (United Kingdom)
- Running time: 96 minutes
- Countries: Ireland; United Kingdom
- Language: English
- Box office: £1.7 million

Hunger is a 2008 historical drama film about the 1981 Irish hunger strike. It was directed by Steve McQueen (in his feature directorial debut) and starred Michael Fassbender, Liam Cunningham, and Liam McMahon.

It premiered at the 2008 Cannes Film Festival, winning the prestigious Caméra d'Or award for first-time filmmakers. It went on to win the Sydney Film Prize at the Sydney Film Festival, the Grand Prix of the Belgian Syndicate of Cinema Critics, best picture from the Evening Standard British Film Awards, and received two BAFTA nominations, winning one. The film was also nominated for eight awards at the 2009 IFTAs, winning six at the event.

The film stars Fassbender as Bobby Sands, the Provisional Irish Republican Army (IRA) member who led the second IRA hunger strike and participated in the no wash protest (led by Brendan "The Dark" Hughes) in which Irish republican prisoners tried to regain political status after it had been revoked by the British government in 1976. It outlines events in the Maze Prison in the period leading up to the hunger strike and its aftermath.

== Plot ==
In December 1980, a new IRA inmate, Davey Gillen, is admitted and categorised as a "non-conforming prisoner" for his refusal to wear the prison uniform outfit. He is sent to his cell naked except for a blanket. His cellmate, Gerry Campbell, has smeared the walls with excrement from floor to ceiling as part of the no wash protest. Gerry's girlfriend sneaks a radio in by wrapping it and storing it in her vagina.

Prison officers forcibly and violently remove the prisoners from their cells and beat them before pinning them down to cut their long hair and beards, grown as part of the no-wash protest. The prisoners resist, with prisoner Bobby Sands spitting into guard Raymond Lohan's face. He responds by punching Sands in the face and then swings again, only to miss and punch the wall, causing his knuckles to bleed. He cuts Sands' hair and beard; the men throw Sands in the bathtub and scrub him clean before hauling him away again.

Later, the prisoners are taken out of their cells and given second-hand civilian clothing. The guards snicker as they hand the clothes to the prisoners, who respond, after Sands' initial action, by tearing up the clothes and wrecking their cells. A large number of riot police enter the prison on a truck. The prisoners are hauled from their cells and forced to run the gauntlet between the lines of the police.

In February 1981, Sands is visited by Father Dominic Moran and discusses the morality of a hunger strike. Sands tells the priest about a trip to County Donegal where he and his friends found a foal by a stream. It had cut itself on the rocks and broken a back leg. Sands tells the priest that he drowned the foal and that although he got into trouble for it, he knew he had done the right thing by ending the animal's suffering. He says he knows what he is doing and what it will do to him but refuses to stand by and do nothing.

Sometime later, Bobby is well into his hunger strike, suffering from weeping sores, kidney failure, low blood pressure, and stomach ulcers. While Sands lies in a bath, a large orderly comes in to give his usual orderly a break. The orderly sits next to the tub and shows Bobby his knuckles, which are tattooed with the letters "UDA".

Sands tries to stand on his own and eventually does so with all his strength, staring defiantly at the orderly but crumples to the floor with no strength left to stand. The orderly carries him to his room. Sands' parents stay for his final days, his mother being at his side when he dies on the fifth of May at the age of 27 , 66 days after beginning the strike.

A textual epilogue reveals that Sands was elected to the United Kingdom Parliament as MP for Fermanagh and South Tyrone while he was on the hunger strike. Nine other men died with him during the seven-month strike before it was called off, and Republican paramilitary groups murdered 16 prison officers during the protests. Shortly afterward, the British government conceded in one form or another to virtually all of the prisoners' five demands despite never officially granting them political status.

== Cast ==
- Michael Fassbender as Bobby Sands
  - Ciaran Flynn as 12-year-old Bobby
- Liam Cunningham as Father Dominic Moran
- Liam McMahon as Gerry Campbell
- Stuart Graham as Raymond Lohan
- Brian Milligan as Davey Gillen
- Laine Megaw as Mrs Lohan
- Karen Hassan as Gerry's girlfriend
- Frank McCusker as the Governor
- Lalor Roddy as William
- Helen Madden as Mrs Sands
- Des McAleer as Mr Sands
- Geoff Gatt as Bearded man
- Rory Mullen as Priest
- Ben Peel as Riot Prison Officer Stephen Graves
- Helena Bereen as Raymond's mother
- Paddy Jenkins as Hitman
- Billy Clarke as Chief Medical Officer
- B.J. Hogg as Loyalist orderly
- Aaron Goldring as Young Bobby's friend

== Production ==
After financing for Hunger was turned down by the Irish Film Board, the film was instead co-funded by Northern Ireland Screen, Broadcast Commission of Ireland, Channel 4, Film4 Productions, and the Wales Creative IP Fund.

In preparation for his role, Michael Fassbender went on a special diet of less than 900 calories a day for ten weeks. After meeting with a nutritionist, he settled on a diet of berries, nuts, and sardines, and underwent periodic medical checks. In an interview with The Telegraph, Fassbender said that he skipped, did yoga, and walked four and a half miles a day, but also added that he had difficulty sleeping, and stopped seeing friends. He also said that the experience made him feel "grateful" and "strong".

The film is also notable for an unbroken 17-minute shot, in which a priest played by Liam Cunningham tries to talk Bobby Sands out of his protest. In it, the camera remains in the same position for the duration of the entire shot. To prepare for the scene, Cunningham moved into Michael Fassbender's apartment for a time while they practiced the scene between twelve and fifteen times a day. According to Fassbender, they did only five takes.

== Release ==
Hunger premiered at the Cannes Film Festival on 15 May 2008, where it opened the official sidebar section, Un Certain Regard, sparking both walkouts and a standing ovation, before screening at the Sydney Film Festival on 7 June, the Toronto International Film Festival on 6 September, the New York Film Festival on 27 September, and the Chicago International Film Festival on 19 October 2008.

The film was released in the United Kingdom and Ireland on 31 October 2008.

=== Critical reception ===
On review aggregator Rotten Tomatoes, the film has an approval rating of 90% based on 133 reviews, with an average score of 7.80/10. The website's critical consensus states, "Unflinching, uncompromising, vivid and vital, Steve McQueen's challenging debut is not for the faint hearted, but it's still a richly rewarding retelling of troubled times." On Metacritic, the film has a weighted average score of 82 out of 100, based on 25 critics, indicating "universal acclaim".

Roger Ebert of the Chicago Sun-Times spoke most positively of the piece, stating: "Hunger is not about the rights and wrongs of the British in Northern Ireland, but about inhumane prison conditions, the steeled determination of IRA members like Bobby Sands, and a rock and a hard place." Peter Travers of Rolling Stone, regarded the film highly and said: "Shockingly immediate and philosophically reflective, Hunger is an indelibly moving tribute to what makes us human." Travers also praised "... McQueen's way of showing the body itself as an arsenal, arguably the last weapon any of us have to fight back." Peter Bradshaw of The Guardian scored the piece a maximum five stars, writing: "There is an avoidance of affect and a repudiation of the traditional liberal-lenient gestures of dialogue, dramatic consensus and narrative resolution. This is a powerful, provocative piece of work, which leaves a zero-degree burn on the retina." Bradshaw additionally praised McQueen's work: "Hunger shows that McQueen is a real film-maker and his background in art has meant a fierce concentration on image, an unflinching attention to what things looked like, moment by moment."

Lauren Wissot of Slant Magazine said of the film: "Hunger, with all its visual, sonic and editing elements flowing together in harmony like a five-star, six-course meal, exemplifies the phrase [art film]", and that "McQueen's film is a nuanced masterpiece that never flaunts its artistry, but uses it humbly to serve the all-important story." Nigel Andrews of the Financial Times heralded the film and its director: "McQueen understands the first principle of cinema. On either side of its middle section, where the very wordiness stands ironic witness to the ultimate impossibility to explain, Hunger has the power and hieratic integrity of silent cinema." Matthew De Abaitua of Film4 scored the film five out of five stars, stating: "Intense, disturbing and powerful mix of vision and detail: a recreation of a terrible time combined with a vivid and distinctive artistic sensibility. Truly powerful filmmaking."

Ian Freer of Empire magazine praised both McQueen and Fassbender, proclaiming: "Anchored by Fassbender's turn, Hunger is as much about the personal as the political. The real breakthrough, though, is McQueen, who turns in a film that dazzles and challenges in equal measure." Dave Calhoun of Time Out, gave the film a maximum five stars, stating: "Imagine how most filmmakers would tell this story and then see 'Hunger': the differences are bold and powerful and restore faith in cinema's ability to cover history free from the bounds of texts and personalities. It's not an easy watch – but it's an invigorating one. Long live McQueen." Noel Murray, writing for The A.V. Club, highlighted: "Hunger may be criticized for being willfully arty, or for reducing a complex political situation to a broadly allegorical vision of martyrdom, but it's never less than visually stunning."

Critic J. Hoberman of The Village Voice called the film "a superbly balanced piece of work" and a "compelling drama that's also a formalist triumph." Hoberman went on to say: "I've seen Hunger three times, and with each screening, the spectacle of violence, suffering, and pain becomes more awful and more awe-inspiring." Lisa Schwarzbaum of Entertainment Weekly gave Hunger an A- on an A+ to F scale, and stated: "For your art-house pleasure and discomfort, here's one of the most talked-about film-festival triumphs of 2008, a disturbingly avid re-creation of the last six weeks in the life and slow, self-imposed wasting of Irish hunger striker Bobby Sands."

Liam Lacey of The Globe and Mail gave the film a maximum of four out of four stars, stating: "Hunger -- the disturbing, provocative, brilliant feature debut from British director Steve McQueen -- does for modern film what Caravaggio did to Renaissance painting." Reyhan Harmanci of the San Francisco Chronicle wrote: "It's horrific. But Hunger displays uncommon intelligence and visual panache, transcending the goal of making the situation seem real. It feels more than real. It's art." In addition, Harmanci praised McQueen's work: "Steve McQueen is a well-known visual artist turned feature film director who makes you wish more moviemakers went to art school." Ann Hornaday of The Washington Post was full of praise for the film, writing: "McQueen has taken the raw materials of filmmaking and committed an act of great art", and calling the piece "An artistic masterpiece."

Wendy Ide of The Times praised McQueen's directing and screenwriting talents by stating: "Ultimately, the one thing that can't be questioned is McQueen's bold and unflinching talent."

In July 2025, it ranked number 50 on Rolling Stone's list of "The 100 Best Movies of the 21st Century."

=== Accolades ===
The film appeared on some critics' top ten lists of the best films of 2008. Andrea Gronvall of Chicago Reader named it the 3rd best film of 2008, and Scott Foundas of LA Weekly named it the 3rd best film of 2008 (along with Che).

Hunger was voted the best film of 2008 by the British film magazine Sight & Sound, and that year McQueen received the Discovery Award and $10,000 at the 33rd annual Toronto film festival. It also won in the best film category at the 2009 Evening Standard British Film Awards. The film also was named the "Best Film of 2009" by the Toronto Film Critics Association Awards; it shared the award with Quentin Tarantino's Inglourious Basterds. Director McQueen won the BAFTA Award for "Special Achievement by a British Director, Writer or Producer for their First Feature Film".
