= Liam McMahon =

Irish actor (born 1976)

- Occupation: Actor
- Years active: 2000–present

Liam McMahon is a Northern Irish actor. His work includes roles in Hunger, The Secret (2016) and Without You (2011).

Known for his role in the 2008 film Hunger, which was directed by Steve McQueen and written by Enda Walsh. The film premiered in Cannes 2008, where it opened the official sidebar section, Un Certain Regard and went on to win the Golden Camera award (Camera d'or). Hunger received seven Irish Film & Television Awards [IFTAs].

== Filmography ==
Year	Title	Role	Notes
2024-2026	The Hardacres	Sam Hardacre	
2021	Agatha and the Truth of Murder	Archie Christie	
2020	Warrior Nun	Blair Macready	
2019	Doctors	Richard Birbeck	1 episode
2014	'71	O'Brien	
2013	The Fall	Michael Day	
2013	The Borgias	The General	
2012	Titanic: Blood and Steel	Arthur McAlister	
2008	The Tudors	Cromwell's Servant	
2008	Hunger	Gerry Campbell	
2007	Northanger Abbey	Sedley	
2000	Snatch	Gypsy Man	
