= Peter Ocko =

American television writer and producer

- Born: Peter Ocko; United States
- Occupations: Television writer, actor
- Years active: 1989–present

Peter Ocko (sometimes credited as Pete Ocko) is an American television writer and producer. Ocko has had a very diverse 30-year career in television and has written and produced for a number of popular television series throughout the 1990s, 2000s, and through to today. Some of these include Pushing Daisies, The Office, The Leftovers, Elementary, and Black Sails and most recently Lodge 49. Ocko began his career as a staff writer on the HBO series Not Necessarily the News, followed by a string of single-camera comedies in the 1990s, writing for such shows as Parker Lewis Can't Lose and Dinosaurs. Crossing over to drama, he wrote for Dead Like Me and Boston Legal, and then created and ran the CBS medical drama 3 lbs starring Stanley Tucci. He now lives in California with his wife, Elizabeth, and 5 kids.

== Career ==
=== Television writer ===
Ocko's writing career began in 1989 when he was one of the writers on the 41st Primetime Emmy Awards and from there co-wrote five episodes of the series Dinosaurs with best friend Adam Barr. From the early nineties until the mid-2000s, he wrote and produced for a number of well-received series, mostly comedy shows including Weird Science, Parker Lewis Can't Lose, Dead Like Me and Pushing Daisies, both of which under executive producer Bryan Fuller.

=== Television creator ===
In the year 2000, he developed an animated series entitled Baby Blues based upon a comic strip. The series first aired on The WB and later on Adult Swim. Although the show was pulled from the schedule at the conclusion of its thirteen episode first season, a second season of thirteen episodes was produced but never aired. In 2006, he created a medical drama entitled 3 lbs, which aired on CBS but was cancelled soon after due to low ratings.

=== The Office ===
Ocko began working on the NBC sitcom The Office at the beginning of its seventh season as a co-executive producer. He wrote one episode, entitled "Christening", which aired on November 4, 2010.

=== Lodge 49 ===
Ocko was the showrunner and executive producer on the AMC comedy-drama, Lodge 49, which premiered on August 6, 2018. On October 4, 2018, the series was renewed for a second season, which premiered on August 12, 2019. More recently, he signed a deal with AMC Studios.

=== Moonhaven ===
Ocko wrote and produced the AMC science fiction drama Moonhaven, which premiered in 2022 and ran for one season.

== Awards and nominations ==
Ocko has been nominated for four Writers Guild of America awards, one of which he won for his work on Not Necessarily the News in 1990.
