= The Serpent Queen =

American period drama television series

- Genre: Historical drama
- Created by: Justin Haythe
- Based on: Catherine de Medici: Renaissance Queen of France by Leonie Frieda
- Starring: Samantha Morton; Amrita Acharia; Barry Atsma; Enzo Cilenti; Sennia Nanua; Kiruna Stamell
- Composer: Bear McCreary
- Country of origin: United States
- Original language: English
- No. of seasons: 2
- No. of episodes: 16

Production
- Executive producers: Stacie Passon; Justin Haythe; Francis Lawrence; Erwin Stoff
- Producer: Nick O'Hagan
- Production companies: About:Blank; 3 Arts Entertainment; Lionsgate Television

Original release
- Network: Starz
- Release: September 11, 2022 – August 30, 2024

The Serpent Queen is an American historical drama television series about the life of Catherine de' Medici, the 16th century Queen of France, as portrayed by Samantha Morton. The series was created by Justin Haythe and is based on the 2004 nonfiction book Catherine de Medici: Renaissance Queen of France by Leonie Frieda. The Serpent Queen premiered on Starz on September 11, 2022. In October 2022, Starz renewed the series for a second season, which premiered on July 12, 2024. In October 2024, the series was canceled after two seasons.

== Plot ==
The series follows the story of Catherine de' Medici, who marries into the French Valois court as a fourteen year-old teenager expected to bring in a fortune in dowry and produce heirs. Despite many challenges, a lifetime of clever political maneuvering allows her to rule France as queen for 30 years.

== Cast and characters ==
=== Main ===
- Samantha Morton as Catherine de' Medici, Queen of France
  - Liv Hill (season 1) as the younger Catherine, Duchess (Duchessina) of Urbino
- Amrita Acharia as Aabis, a Romani woman who is part of young Catherine's entourage
- Ruby Bentall as Angelica, daughter of a famed perfumier who accompanies Catherine to France
- Barry Atsma (season 1) and Alexandre Willaume (season 2) as Montmorency, a member of King Francis's privy council and later the Constable General of France
- Enzo Cilenti as Cosimo Ruggeri, an Italian fortune teller brought to France by Catherine
- Sennia Nanua (season 1) and Emma McDonald (season 2) as Rahima, Catherine's new maid who rises to a powerful position in the court
- Kiruna Stamell as Mathilde (season 1), Catherine's dwarf maid
- Nicholas Burns as Antoine de Bourbon, elder son of Charles de Bourbon
- Beth Goddard as Antoinette de Guise, Claude's wife, the mother of Francois and Charles, and the grandmother of Mary, Queen of Scots
- Raza Jaffrey as Francois, Duc de Guise, elder son of Claude de Guise
- Danny Kirrane as Louis de Bourbon, Antoine's younger brother
- Ray Panthaki as Charles, Cardinal de Guise, the Duc de Guise's younger brother
- Angus Imrie as Henri of Navarre, later Henry IV (season 2), the son of Antoine de Bourbon and Jeanne d’Albret
- Bill Milner as Charles IX (season 2), Catherine and Henri II's second son, and the King of France
  - Jordan Bigot and Yngve Sanchez Beuthe portray the younger Charles in season 1
- Stanley Morgan as the Duke of Anjou, later Henry III (season 2), Catherine and Henri II's son and the younger brother of Charles IX
- Philippine Velge as Margot (season 2), Catherine and Henri II's youngest daughter

=== Recurring ===
- Ludivine Sagnier as Diane de Poitiers, Henri's older mistress (season 1; guest season 2)
- Paul Chahidi as Charles de Bourbon (season 1), another member of the privy council
- Navid Negahban as Claude, Duke de Guise (season 1), the third member of the privy council
- Naomi Battrick as Anne d'Etampes (season 1), one of Francis I's mistresses
- Colm Meaney as Francis I (season 1)
- Rebecca Gethings as Queen Eleanor (season 1)
- Gemma Dobson as Nathalie (season 1), a kitchen servant
- Antonia Clarke as Mary, Queen of Scots (season 1; guest season 2)
- Steve Furst as Dr. Fernel
- Lee Ingleby as Henri II (season 1)
  - Alex Heath portrays the younger Henri, the Duke of Orleans and second son of King Francis, who marries Catherine
- George Jaques as Francis II (season 1), Catherine and Henri II's eldest son
- Jean-Stan Du Pac (season 1) and Mikaël Mittelstadt (season 2) as Matisse, a boy who becomes Sebastio's apprentice and befriends Aabis, who later becomes like a son to her
- Jade Croot (season 1) and Isobel Jesper Jones (season 2) as Edith, a Huguenot girl protected by Montmorency who becomes a preacher
- Laura Marcus as Elisabeth (season 2), Catherine and Henri II's oldest daughter
- Scott Folan as Hercule (season 2), Catherine and Henri II's younger son
- Neill Murray as Balsac (season 2), Anjou's mignon
- Henry Felix as Lemur, Anjou's mignon (season 2)
- Alexander Ferrario as Caylus, Anjou's mignon (season 2)
- Rosalie Craig as Jeanne d'Albret (season 2), the queen of Navarre, wife of Antoine and mother of Henry IV

=== Guest ===
- Louis Landau as Dauphin François (season 1), King Francis's firstborn son
- Charles Dance as Pope Clement VII (season 1)
- Adam Garcia as Sebastio (season 1), young Catherine's atelier
- Memet Ali Alabora as Sultan Suleiman (season 1)
- Anna Cottis as Cook (season 1)
- David Denman as Pierre Marques (season 1)
- Katie Haigh Mayet as Geraldine Marques (season 1), Pierre's wife
- Rupert Everett as Charles V, Holy Roman Emperor
- Nicolas Robin as Gabriel de Lorges, Count of Montgomery (season 1)
- James Gerard as Tancrede, the servant of Louis de Bourbon
- Robin Greer as Thomas (season 2), the secret boyfriend of Francois, Duc de Guise
- Minnie Driver as Elizabeth I (season 2), Queen of England
- Alex Price as Lord Throckmorton (season 2), Elizabeth's councilor
- Ashley Thomas as Alessandro de Medici (season 2), Catherine's illegitimate half brother and Duke of Florence
- Paulo dos Santos as Prince Philip (season 2), the son of the Holy Roman Emperor
- Lilea Le Borgne as Sisi of Austria (season 2), Charles's love interest

== Episodes ==
=== Series overview ===
Season	Episodes	Originally released	
Season	Episodes	First released	Last released
1	8	September 11, 2022	October 30, 2022
2	8	July 12, 2024	August 30, 2024

=== Season 1 (2022) ===
No. overall	No. in season	Title	Directed by	Written by	Original release date	U.S.A. viewers (millions)
1	1	"The Medici Bitch"	Stacie Passon	Justin Haythe	September 11, 2022	0.194
Catherine de' Medici, Queen of France, starts recounting her early days to the new servant girl Rahima. An orphan from a wealthy Italian family in Florence and raised in a convent since infancy, Catherine is sent by her uncle, Pope Clement VII, as a potential bride for Henri, the second son of King Francis I of France. Though considered plain and undesirable by the royal family, shrewd Catherine takes the negotiation into her own hands and convinces Francis to accept her. Catherine is smitten with Henri and assumes her feelings are reciprocated. They are married, and Catherine meets her distant cousin Diane de Poitiers, who gives her advice on how to handle Henri on their wedding night. The marriage is consummated, but afterward, Henri is upset and sends Catherine away. Looking for answers, she arrives at his chambers to find him in bed with Diane. In the present, Catherine conveys to Rahima that the lesson learned was to trust no one, and the Queen has her dragged away to the dungeon.
2	2	"To War Rather Than To Bed"	Stacie Passon	Justin Haythe	September 18, 2022	0.183
In the present, Catherine chooses Rahima as her new maid, and continues with her story. Young Catherine is desperate to conceive a child to secure her place in court, especially because of the unpaid dowry and her having a vision foreboding the death of her uncle, the Pope. Diane plots to be rid of Catherine and tries to get Catherine's servants to betray her. Thanks to Diane's machinations Henri avoids Catherine's bed-chamber, and in desperation, she tries to get a stable hand to impregnate her. Soon after, emboldened by the king, Henri visits Catherine's bed-chamber to perform his duty. Catherine and Henri bond over their mutual dislike of the Dauphin, Henri's cruel older brother. Recognizing that King Francis and his guest, the powerful Ottoman Sultan Suleiman the Magnificent, both have a common enemy in Charles V, Holy Roman Emperor, Catherine puts in motion an alliance between them for which Henri is credited. In the present, after deducing Rahima is being harassed by another servant girl, Nathalie, the Queen encourages Rahima to stand up for herself and gives her a small sachet of gunpowder. She hides it in Nathalie's bread dough and as Rahima scurries away, the kitchen explodes behind her.
3	3	"The Price"	Stacie Passon	Justin Haythe & Elizabeth Chakkappan	September 25, 2022	0.234
Nathalie has lost an eye, and Catherine appears just in time to save Rahima from punishment. Catherine's widowed daughter-in-law Mary, Queen of Scots, vows to prevent Catherine's son Charles's coronation. In the past, Young Catherine swoons over Henri's wartime letters but is distressed when he returns with his Italian mistress Filippa Duci and infant daughter Diane. Diane de Poitiers intimidates Filippa to the point that she flees with her baby and offers to assist Catherine in conceiving to secure both their futures. Henri's military success in Italy wins him his father's favor, and the king expresses his admiration to Catherine for engineering the alliance. Charles de Bourbon suggests that Francois assassinate Catherine to eliminate France's distracting ties to Italy, and Catherine is ambushed in the forest, but she manages to escape. Catherine seeks help getting pregnant from Ruggeri, who cites a future price to be paid and hands her a book on potions. Francois collapses while playing tennis and dies of heart failure. The King becomes vehement in the belief that the Dauphin was poisoned. Ruggeri's book is found in Sebastio's room, and Catherine tearfully allows her atelier's arrest to save herself. Sebastio is executed, Henri is elevated to Dauphin and Catherine falls pregnant.
4	4	"A New Era"	Ingrid Jungermann	Justin Haythe & Elizabeth Chakkappan	October 2, 2022	0.188
Nathalie threatens Rahima with revenge when Mary ascends the throne. Catherine’s narration jumps fifteen years and nine children later as she and Henri lose a newborn son. In seclusion, Catherine falls into a fog. The Guises seize Château de Chenonceau from Pierre Marques, while the Bourbons attempt an alliance with Marques to thwart the Guises. King Francis suffers a fall during an early morning hunt and later succumbs to his injuries, but not before assuring Catherine that she will prevail after his death. Catherine is admitted to the privy council and warns Henri of a challenge from the Holy Roman Emperor. She offers Château de Chaumont as a gift to Diane, who is indignant at being banished. Diane pays Angelica to supply her with a golden solution that will purportedly preserve her youth. Henri dons Diane’s colors on coronation day, to Catherine's dismay. A messenger delivers the severed head of a Valois envoy from the Holy Roman Emperor. In the present, Catherine receives a written message that troubles her. Rahima claims she is unable to read it, but later she's seen reading a book in her room.
5	5	"The First Regency"	Ingrid Jungermann	Jessica Brickman and Justin Haythe	October 9, 2022	0.102
Catherine tells Rahima the message contains evidence that Mary and her cousin Elizabeth I, Queen of England, are conspiring against her. Catherine recalls that Henri named her regent while he was away fighting the Holy Roman Emperor. The Bourbons and the Guises try to manipulate Catherine to their own ends, but she outmaneuvers them and appeals to the Protestant faction for both financial and military aid. Angelica warns Diane that too much of the gold solution can drive her insane, but Diane insists on increasing the dosage. Diane pleads with Henri to forgo the battle, and though he returns to court victorious, he fears he is seen as weak and under Diane's control. Catherine suggests to Henri that he find Montmorency and bring him back to court. Protestant Pierre Marques lashes out with a warning that the self-indulgent ruling class will soon be overthrown by the commoners and an incensed Diane slashes his throat. Henry is impressed by Catherine's astute and effective regency. In the present, Rahima searches Mary's rooms at Catherine's request, looking for more correspondence between Mary and Queen Elizabeth I. Catherine sends one of Mary's ladies-in-waiting to Mary's room and Rahima is discovered.
6	6	"The Last Joust"	Justin Haythe	Dawn M. Kamoche & Ariella Blejer and Justin Haythe	October 16, 2022	0.156
To further their agenda, the Guises collude with Diane to move forward with the wedding of their devout Catholic niece, Mary, to Henri's heir, Francis II. Despite Catherine's interference and Henri's initial reluctance, Henri ultimately bends to Diane's will. Wanting to be rid of Diane once and for all, Catherine finally locates Ruggeri and recounts her dream of Diane's and Henri's deaths. Charles V, Holy Roman Emperor and the King of Spain, attends the nuptials. Believing that sacrificing Henri is worth neutralizing Diane's influence, Catherine encourages him to joust. She changes her mind at the last minute, but Henri proceeds and is mortally wounded. In the present, Catherine refuses to release an imprisoned Rahima and reaffirms to Ruggeri that she has picked the right maid as she plans to get rid of Mary.
7	7	"An Attack on the King"	Stacie Passon	Ashley Cardiff and Justin Haythe	October 23, 2022	0.222
In the present, Mary visits Rahima to recount events from her point of view in an attempt to sway the maid to her side and procure evidence of Catherine’s involvement in the dark arts. In the past, Henri is impaled through the eye during a joust and later succumbs to his injuries in the arms of a disbelieving Diane. After the king's death, Catherine banishes Diane from court. Holy Roman Emperor Charles V attends Henri's funeral, and joins Catherine who is stood by the coffin, suggesting they become lovers. Catherine calmly rejects his advances, he then boasts to Catherine his plans to provoke Mary’s zeal to make her bring about France's destruction. An edict criminalising Protestantism goes into effect, resulting in the expulsion of the Bourbons and rampant executions. Catherine finds Montmorency at a clandestine Protestant service and implores him to reason with Francis II. Catherine and the Bourbons plot to kidnap Francis II and ultimately return him to paint the Protestants as patriotic. In the present, Rahima flatters Mary and agrees to search for a letter from Elizabeth I in Catherine's quarters. Rahima and Catherine reconcile.
8	8	"A Queen Is Made"	Justin Haythe	Justin Haythe	October 30, 2022	0.202
In the recent past, Catherine thwarts the kidnapping plot, and the Bourbon princes of the blood flee. Catherine stabs Montmorency so that Antoine, the regent, can escape, while Louis is captured by François and sentenced to death for treason. The Guises seek to install a recovering Montmorency as a puppet regent to appease the people, whereas Catherine goads Mary into requesting the regency for herself. Francis II, dying of consumption, emotionally rejects Mary's request but approves Catherine's regency, which Montmorency forces Antoine to sign at gunpoint. Louis is pardoned in the nick of time as Catherine's regency is proclaimed. In the present, Rahima steals a letter from Elizabeth I to Mary that Catherine has intercepted. Realizing it is a forgery, she hands it over to a trusting Mary, demanding a title and land from Catherine for her loyalty. In the false letter, Elizabeth I promises Mary to help her secure the French throne, and as Catherine intended, Mary returns to Scotland only to realize the fabrication. At the 1561 coronation of 11-year-old Charles IX, Catherine crowns her son herself.

=== Season 2 (2024) ===
No. overall	No. in season	Title	Directed by	Written by	Original release date	U.S.A. viewers (millions)
9	1	"Grand Tour"	Justin Haythe	Justin Haythe	July 12, 2024	N/A
Ten years later, in 1572, Charles IX is an adult but still defers to Catherine for governance. His brother, Anjou, taunts his subservience to their mother, leading to a brief brawl. Rahima has risen to a position of power at court as Catherine's lady-in-waiting and Catherine still visits Ruggeri in the forest. Antoinette pressures her sons to instigate a war between the Catholics and Protestants to ensure their family's future, but Francois resists. The Bourbon brothers' schemes require the assistance of Antoine's intimidating wife, Jeanne d'Albret, Queen of Navarre. To secure Jeanne's cooperation, the Bourbons convince Charles to attend a service at a local Protestant church. Catherine begins an affair with Montmorency. Charles sets out to the church along with the Bourbons. Antoinette blackmails Francois with letters written to his male lover, and he has his men set the Protestant church on fire, with Aabis, Matisse, and Edith inside.
10	2	"Second Coming"	Justin Haythe	Justin Haythe & Elizabeth Chakkappan	July 19, 2024	N/A
Charles IX and the Bourbons return to the palace unharmed. Assuming no one survived the fire the Bourbons demand retribution from Francois for the church's destruction, convinced that he's responsible. Francois strangles his male lover for his betrayal and destroys the letters his mother had taken. To avoid conflict, Catherine strikes a deal with both the Bourbons and Guises — the Bourbons can start trade negotiations with protestant England and in return, they will drop the case against the Guises; the Guises and the other Catholic nobles will finance the construction of a new palace that Catherine plans to build in Paris in exchange for Francois's pardon. Catherine visits Diane de Poitiers and asks her to contribute to the palace and in return promises to rescind the law preventing her daughters from inheriting her estate. Catherine also asks Diane to look after her children while she procures funds for the palace in Italy. Rahima imparts to Catherine rumors that people survived the church fire. Later Francois finds Edith and her congregation including Aabis and Matisse, battered but alive and hiding in the forest, with Edith planning a revolt against the monarchy.
11	3	"Death of a Prince"	Melanie Mayron	Justin Haythe & Elizabeth Chakkappan	July 26, 2024	N/A
Anjou and Retinue are intimidated by a group of Edith's Protestant followers. Anjou demands justice from Charles but is rebuffed, citing it will only escalate current hostilities. In Florence, Catherine manages to secure a loan from the Bank of Strozzi and meets her half-brother, Alessandro de Medici. Though Catherine's initially skeptical, she warms up to him. Montmorency meets up with Edith and she agrees to disband her congregation if Francois is punished. Aabis tries to get Edith to convince Matisse to leave the forest to get medicated, but she refuses to force him to leave. Diane arrives at court and counsels Anjou to abandon his plans for revenge. Cardinal Guise tries to persuade Anjou to avenge Hercule. Jeanne d'Albret arrives in England and meets with Queen Elizabeth I. The Bourbons including Jeanne's son Henri advise Charles to initiate the trade talks immediately without waiting for Catherine, and Montmorency asks him to arrest Francois; the king concedes to both. When Anjou and his entourage happen upon another protestant group he's asked to convert to their faith. In response he drowns their leader and one of them throws a stone at Hercule, wounding him severely.
12	4	"Judas"	Melanie Mayron	Justin Haythe & Elizabeth Chakkappan	August 2, 2024	N/A
Catherine arrives back just in time to see dying Hercule. Cardinal Guise prompts Anjou to avenge Hercule with the help of the imminently arriving Holy Roman Emperor. However, at Hercule's funeral, the Holy Roman Emperor Charles V informs Catherine of the Guise's plan and stresses the importance of quelling the protestants. To garner her favor, Angelica informs Catherine about Matisse's predicament and she makes Ruggeri suggest Aabis poison Edith to save Matisse. However, Angelica is rejected by Catherine and therefore she strikes a deal with the Bourbons. Louis de Bourbon reaches England and meets with Queen Elizabeth to hash out the trade deal. She convinces him to collude with her to usurp the Valois and supplant his house on the French throne. The Holy Roman Emperor's sadistic son Philip is kicked on the head by a horse and becomes comatose. Margot tries to get Catherine to release Francois, but instead, Catherine makes her leverage the king's unnatural attraction towards her to get the duke released and put Anjou under house arrest. Aabis tries to poison Edith but fails. Taking advantage of the development Edith proclaims another miracle and gets Aabis baptized into the protestant faith.
13	5	"Time with the Family"	Kate Dennis	Justin Haythe & Elizabeth Chakkappan	August 9, 2024	N/A
Alessandro invites Catherine to invest in his endeavors in America. Montmorency has a falling out with Catherine over the murder attempt on Edith and has Angelica testify against her before the privy council. Catherine resigns from the council, but not before — on Ruggeri's advice to make her sons choose sides — making sure that Anjou replaces her; thereby having Anjou on the Guise (Catholic) side and Charles on the Bourbon (Protestant) side to balance out power. Antoinette notices Francois and Margot's affinity towards one another, but when broached Francois shuts her down. The Bourbons along with Jeanne and Henri meet Edith, and she tortures Antoine as a rite of ablution. Cardinal Guise has a crisis of faith and secretly gets baptized into the protestant faith. To avoid a civil war, Catherine has her daughter Elizabeth marry vegetative Philip, son of the Holy Roman Emperor and Queen Elizabeth arrives at the French court on Catherine's invitation.
14	6	"Courting the Valois"	Kate Dennis	Justin Haythe & Elizabeth Chakkappan	August 16, 2024	N/A
Catherine asks her sons to show unity in the English Queen's presence. Rahima informs Catherine of Cardinal Guise's rumored conversion and is instructed to get the Catholic League involved, while Edith asks the Cardinal to spy on Catherine. The Catholic League visits Antoinette and she pressures Francois to get his brother in line. Queen Elizabeth presents herself as a prospective bride for Charles to the dismay of the Bourbons, but later she assures Louis de Bourbon that their previous agreement remains intact. Midway through a hunting excursion with the royal family and Queen Elizabeth, Charles is injured and Catherine has another vision. The Bourbons along with Throckmorton bring weapons to Edith but she remains suspicious. Rahima passes her embezzlement suspicions on Alessandro to Catherine and she has Angelica spy on Alessandro. Later Rahima confronts Alessandro and he confronts her back. Ruggeri cautions Catherine of the traitors surrounding her, but she angrily storms off, unwilling to believe him. Queen Elizabeth, taking advantage of the rivalry between Charles and Anjou, suggests a duel between them, and declares that she'll marry the winner. The duel gets heated and despite Catherine's instructions, Anjou refuses to let Charles win. Before the duel concludes Charles collapses and coughs up blood.
15	7	"A House Divided"	Justin Haythe	Justin Haythe & Elizabeth Chakkappan	August 23, 2024	N/A
Charles is diagnosed with consumption, and Catherine swears Dr. Fernel to secrecy. The Catholic league gives Francois an ultimatum to either marry Princess Margot and assume the throne or see his brother get executed. Francois tries to deter Margot from pursuing him but later Antoinette consoles and encourages her. Catherine proposes that Elizabeth marry Anjou instead of the king, which she rejects on account of Anjou's proclivities. Before Elizabeth abruptly leaves the next day she has a brief confrontation with Catherine and leaves with her evidence of the Bourbons' treachery. The Bourbons evade capture and join Edith formally, and on Angelica's reference, Catherine catches Rahima and Alessandro planning on betraying her. Montmorency baptizes into Protestantism in exchange for Edith meeting the king. Catherine finds Ruggeri and he perceives that she has six betrayers around her—Montmorency, the Guises, the Bourbons, Rahima, Alessandro, and an unknown sixth person, who is implied to be one of her children. Antoinette and Margot seemingly convince Catherine to let her marry Francois. Catherine informs Cardinal Guise that the king is dying, and after finding out the Catholic League's plans, she artfully reconciles with Anjou. Charles and Catherine meet Edith. Catherine proposes to Edith a union between Henri and Margot and entices her with a subsequent transfer of regency, terms to which she agrees. Charles gets baptized into Protestantism.
16	8	"All Saints Day"	Justin Haythe	Justin Haythe	August 30, 2024	N/A
Charles refuses to approve Margot's marriage to Henri despite the knowledge of his imminent death but gives his leave after catching Margot and Francois in bed together. After instructing Francois to take Margot's virtue, Antoinette spreads rumors about her which fall on the ears of Jeanne d'Albret. Jeanne informs Catherine of the rumors and to prevent Jeanne from forestalling the wedding Catherine has Angelica poison her. Antoine tries to persuade Henri to abandon the wedding but Henri brushes off his concerns, and Antoinette coerces Francois to proclaim he slept with Margot during her wedding but he defies his mother at the last minute. The Marriage is carried out with the attendance of many Catholic and Protestant nobles; and after the consummation in the banquet that follows Catherine hands off the signed regency to Edith. Right afterwards Catherine gives leave to a killing spree by cutting Edith's throat. While she bleeds to her death, Anjou and his mignons arrive and start slaughtering the protestant nobles in attendance in the name of the House of Guise. Angelica kills Montmorency, Ruggeri kills Alessandro and Anjou kills Louis. Anjou prepares to kill Henri but Margot goads Catherine into sparing him. After Charles confronts the Queen Mother on the massacre she pressures him to order the death of Edith's followers before they can come for the royals. Rahima is spared on account of her carrying Alessandro's child. Catherine pins the blame for the massacre on the House of Guise and the Catholic League; the former is imprisoned and the latter is hanged. Unbeknownst to everyone, Louis and Antoine survive the ordeal and Catherine starts planning Anjou's reign after Charles.

== Production ==
=== Development ===
In February 2021, Starz granted an eight episode series based upon the book Catherine de Medici: Renaissance Queen of France by Leonie Frieda, with Justin Haythe set to serve as a writer and executive producer, with Francis Lawrence and Erwin Stoff also set to executive produce. Stacie Passon will direct multiple episodes of the series, including the pilot. Production companies involved in the series were slated to consist of Lionsgate Television and 3 Arts Entertainment. Starz renewed the series for a second season on October 27, 2022. Lorris Chevalier is the historical advisor.

On October 9, 2024, the series was canceled after two seasons.

=== Casting ===
In April 2021, Samantha Morton joined the cast as Catherine de' Medici. In May 2021, Amrita Acharia, Enzo Cilenti, Barry Atsma, Nicholas Burns and Danny Kirrane joined the cast in starring roles, while Charles Dance, Ludivine Sagnier, Liv Hill, Kiruna Stamell, and Colm Meaney in recurring capacity. In June 2021, Ray Panthaki joined the cast of the series. In August 2021, it was announced Raza Jaffrey, Sennia Nanua, Beth Goddard and Alex Heath had joined the cast of the series, in undisclosed, starring and recurring capacities, respectively.

New cast members for season two were announced in March 2024, including Minnie Driver in the recurring role of Queen Elizabeth I, Emma McDonald as a recast Rahima, as well as series regulars Angus Imrie, Stanley Morgan and Philippine Velge. Also recurring will be Bill Milner, Ashley Thomas, Rosalie Craig, Isobel Jesper Jones and Alexandre Willaume.

=== Filming ===
Principal photography of the first season began in April 2021 in Marseille and in the Loire Valley in France and in the Papal Palace in Italy.

=== Music ===
The Serpent Queen (A Starz Original Series Soundtrack)

Soundtrack album by Bear McCreary
- Released: 28 October 2022
- Genre: Orchestral
- Length: 49:15
- Labels: Sparks & Shadows

Bear McCreary chronology
Alloyed (2022)	The Serpent Queen (A Starz Original Series Soundtrack) (2022)	God of War Ragnarök (2022)

The Serpent Queen (A Starz Original Series Soundtrack)
No.	Title	Length
1.	"The Serpent Queen" (feat. Esjay Jones)	3:35
2.	"Catherine de' Medici"	3:10
3.	"Rajima and the Queen"	5:20
4.	"Arrival in France"	3:46
5.	"Catherine Meets Henri"	3:18
6.	"From Duke to King"	5:19
7.	"Diane de Poitiers"	4:04
8.	"Drenched in Gold"	3:12
9.	"Forbidden Fruit"	3:56
10.	"An Eye for an Eye"	4:59
11.	"Mad Love"	3:36
12.	"Trust No One"	4:30
13.	"The Serpent Queen Main Title"	0:25
Total length:		49:15

== Release ==
The Serpent Queen premiered on Starz on September 11, 2022.

The second season premiered on July 12, 2024.

== Reception ==
On the review aggregator website Rotten Tomatoes, 100% of 19 critics' reviews are positive, with an average rating of 7.7/10. The website's consensus reads, "The Serpent Queen dramatizes one of history's most infamous monarchs with a deft, sardonic touch, with Samantha Morton's commanding star turn likely to swallow viewers' attention whole." Metacritic, which uses a weighted average, assigned a score of 76 out of 100 based on 12 critics, indicating "generally favorable reviews".
