= Amrou Al-Kadhi =

British-Iraqi writer, drag performer, and filmmaker

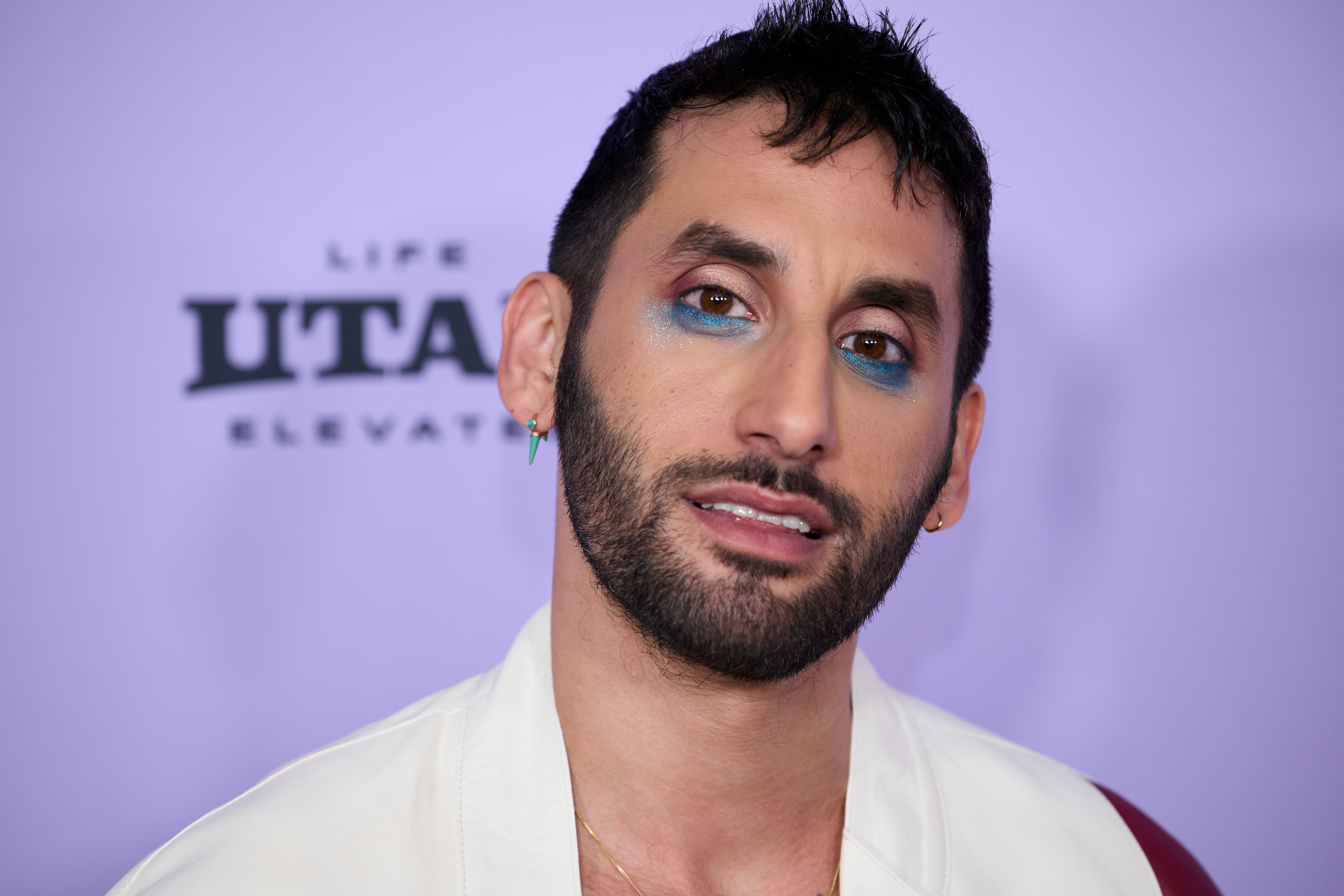
- Al-Kadhi at the 2024 Sundance Film Festival
- Born: 23 June 1990 (age 36); London, England
- Education: Cambridge University
- Notable work: Life as a Unicorn

Amrou Al-Kadhi (born 23 June 1990) is a British-Iraqi writer, actor, drag performer, and filmmaker whose work primarily focuses on queer identity, cultural representation and racial politics.

== Early life and education ==
Al-Kadhi was born in London to a tight-knit conservative Iraqi Muslim family. They were brought up in Dubai and Bahrain, before the family moved back to London. Al-Kadhi claims that discovering marine biology and quantum physics helped them understand their queer identity. Al-Kadhi has a twin brother.

In 2006, Al-Kadhi was awarded a two-year scholarship to Eton College, where they did their A-levels, then graduated from the University of Cambridge with a BA and MPhil in the History of Art.

Al-Kadhi's stage name is Glamrou. It was at the University of Cambridge that they discovered drag, organising events and becoming a "drag mother" to their fellow drag queens in the university's first professional drag band. While at Cambridge, they created and led the musical comedy drag troupe Denim, for which they co-wrote and performed in shows. More recently, they have left the troupe in order to concentrate on solo performance in a show called Glamrou: From Quran to Queen.

== Career ==
=== Films ===
Al-Kadhi's first acting role, at the age of fourteen, was in Steven Spielberg's film Munich, where they played the role of an Islamic terrorist's son. They have commented that, as an Arab actor, they have been approached to play the role of a terrorist almost thirty times.

Al-Kadhi's feature directorial debut Layla, with Film 4 and Fox Cub Films, premiered at the 2024 Sundance Film Festival.

In 2021, Al-Kadhi appeared in the Sony's Spider-Man Universe (SSU) film Venom: Let There Be Carnage as a temporary host of the alien symbiote Venom after he separates from Eddie Brock.

=== Television ===
Al-Kadhi has three TV series in development: as writer and creator, Targets, with BBC Drama, as star, co-creator and co-writer, Nefertiti, a comedy series in development with Big Talk Productions, and as co-star, co-creator and co-writer, Beards, in development with Playground Entertainment.

=== Writing ===
Al-Kadhi's autobiography, Life as a Unicorn: A Journey From Shame to Pride and Everything In Between, was published in 2019 and tells the story of their estrangement from and final reconciliation with their mother and Islam. In 2020, the autobiography won the Society of Authors' Somerset Maugham Award.

They write a fortnightly opinion column for The Independent, and a monthly column in Gay Times. They have also contributed to GQ, The Guardian, Attitude, CNN and Little White Lies. Al-Kadhi writes on topics ranging from queer identity and Islamophobia to the philosophy of marine biology and film criticism.

== Personal life ==
Al-Kadhi is queer and non-binary.

== Filmography ==
=== Film ===
Title	Year	Role	Production
Nightstand	2016	Writer and performer	
Clash	2017	Director and writer	BBC4 Broadcast, BFI, Revry
Run(a)way Arab	2017	Director and writer	Peccadillo Pictures & Revry
Victoria Sin	2017	Director and writer	Nowness, Revry
Anemone	2018	Director and writer	BBC films and Film London
Christopher Robin	2018	Actor, Nemir Azizi (London Ticket Attendant)	
Venom: Let There Be Carnage	2021	Actor, Venom (Host Two)	Cameo appearance
Layla	2024	Director and writer	

=== Television ===
Year	Title	Role	Production
2018	Hollyoaks	Writer of episodes 5032, 5092, 5180 and 5275	Channel 4
2019	Little America	Co-writer of "The Son" episode	Apple Original Series/Universal Television
2021	The Watch	Co-writer, episode 106	BBC America / BBC Studios
2023	American Horror Stories	Anna Rexhia season 3 episode 1 "Bestie"	FX on Hulu

== Stage ==
- 2016, Denim Titanique
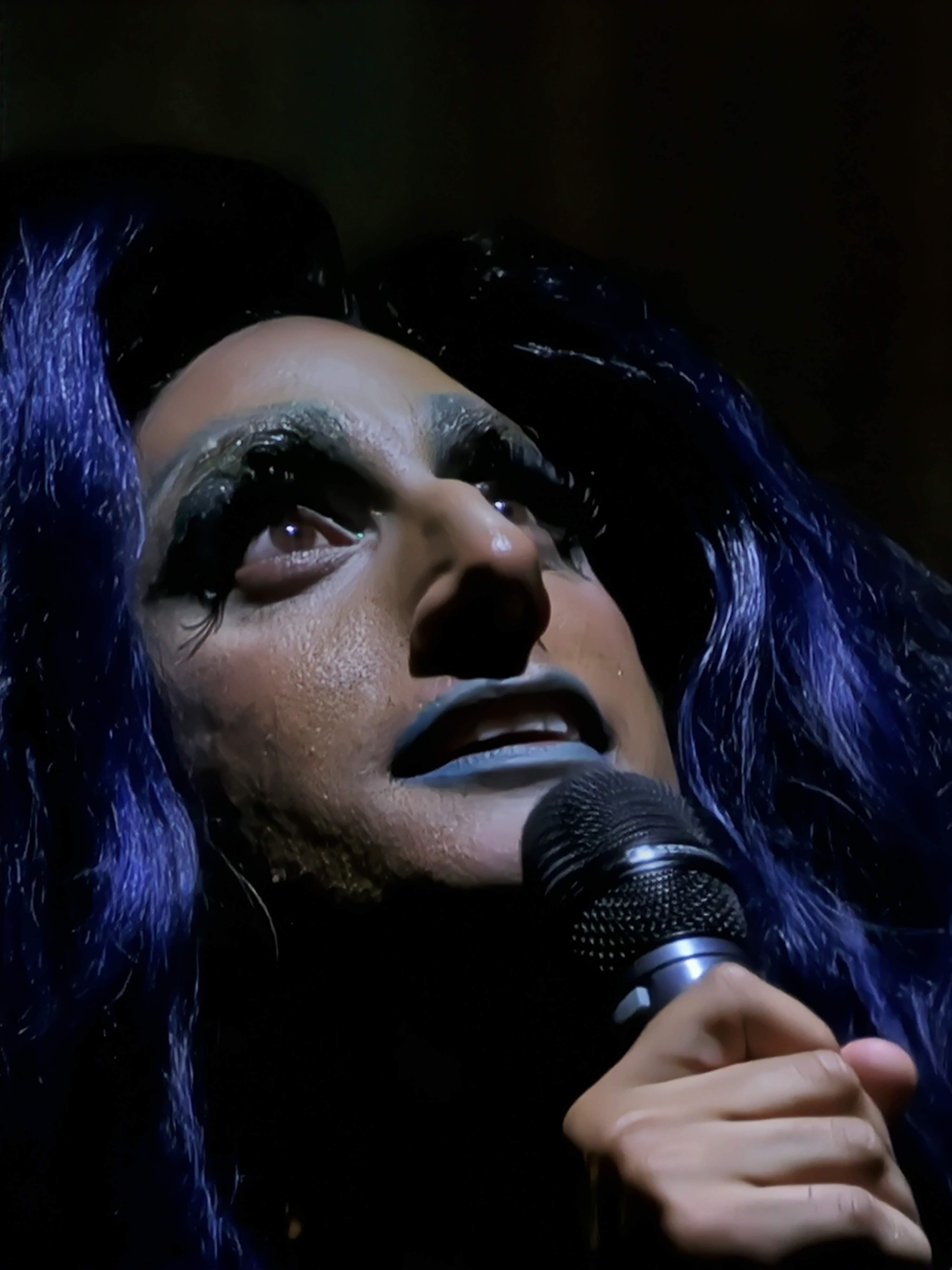
  Amrou Al-Kadhi performs as Glamrou in Glamrou: From Quran to Queen at the Soho Theatre in September 2022
- 2016, Denim, The Vault Festival
- 2017, Denim: World Tour, Underbelly, Edinburgh Fringe
- 2018, The Denim Juniors, Soho Theatre, Edinburgh Fringe
- 2018, Denim: The Reunion Tour, Soho Theatre
- 2021-22: Glamrou: From Quran to Queen, Soho Theatre

== Books ==
- 2019: Unicorn: The Memoir of a Muslim Drag Queen (4th Estate, HarperCollins UK)Hardback / ISBN 978-0-00-830606-9
- 2022: Life as a Unicorn: A Journey from Shame to Pride and Everything in Between(4th Estate, HarperCollins UK)Paperback / ISBN 978-0-00-830610-6

== Awards and honours ==
In June 2020, in honour of the 50th anniversary of the first LGBTQ Pride parade, Queerty named Al-Kadhi among the fifty heroes "leading the nation toward equality, acceptance, and dignity for all people". In 2020 Al-Kadhi won the Polari First Book Prize for their memoir Life as a Unicorn.
