= Catherine de' Medici =

Queen of France from 1547 to 1559

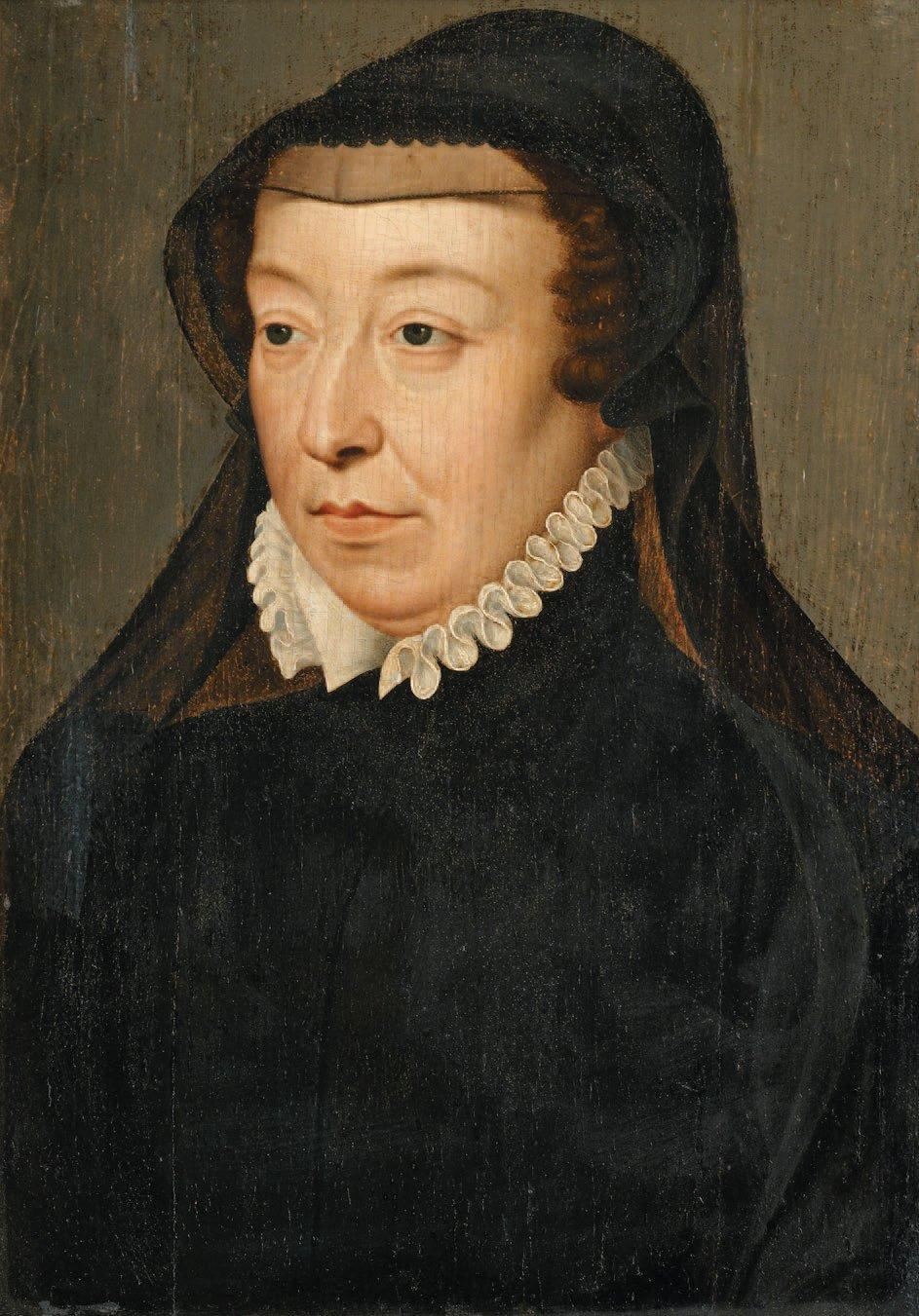
- Portrait, c. 1560

Queen consort of France
- Tenure: 31 March 1547 – 10 July 1559
- Coronation: 10 June 1549

Queen regent of France
- Regency: 5 December 1560 – 17 August 1563
- Monarch: Charles IX
- Born: 13 April 1519; Florence
- Died: 5 January 1589 (aged 69); Château de Blois, France
- Burial: 4 February 1589: Saint-Sauveur, Blois; 4 April 1609; Saint Denis Basilica
- Spouse: Henry II of France (m. 1533; died 1559)
- Issue more...: Francis II of France; Elisabeth, Queen of Spain; Claude, Duchess of Lorraine; Louis, Duke of Orléans; Charles IX of France; Henry III of France; Margaret, Queen of France; Francis, Duke of Anjou; Victoria of Valois; Joan of Valois
Names
- Caterina Maria Romula di Lorenzo de' Medici
- House: Medici
- Father: Lorenzo de' Medici, Duke of Urbino
- Mother: Madeleine de La Tour d'Auvergne

Catherine de' Medici (Note: Italian: Caterina de' Medici, pronounced [kateˈriːna de ˈmɛːditʃi]; French: Catherine de Médicis, pronounced [katʁin də medisis]) (13 April 1519 – 5 January 1589) was Queen of France from 1547 to 1559 by marriage to King Henry II. She was the mother of French kings Francis II, Charles IX, and Henry III, and the cousin of Pope Clement VII. The years during which her sons reigned have been called "the age of Catherine de' Medici" since she had extensive, albeit at times varying, influence on French politics.

Catherine was born to the Medici family in Florence to Lorenzo de' Medici, Duke of Urbino, and Madeleine de La Tour d'Auvergne. In 1533, at the age of 14, she married Henry, the second son of King Francis I and Queen Claude of France, who would become Dauphin of France (heir to the throne) upon the death of his elder brother Francis in 1536. Catherine's marriage was arranged by Clement VII. Henry largely excluded Catherine from state affairs during his reign, instead showering favours on his chief mistress, Diane de Poitiers, who wielded significant influence in the court. Henry's sudden accidental death in 1559 thrust Catherine into the political arena as mother of the frail 15-year-old Francis II. When Francis II died the next year, she became regent on behalf of her 10-year-old son Charles IX and thus gained sweeping powers. After Charles died in 1574, Catherine played a key role in the reign of her third son, Henry III. He dispensed with her advice only in the last months of her life but outlived her by just seven months.

Catherine's three sons reigned in an age of almost constant civil and religious war in France. The Catholic Guise faction tried to displace her sons in its attempt to establish its own dynasty to rule over France. Catherine also tried to think of ways to weaken the Guise Faction, which treated her scornfully. The problems facing the monarchy were complex and daunting. However, Catherine kept the monarchy and state institutions functioning, if at a minimal level. At first, Catherine compromised and made concessions to the rebelling Calvinist Protestants known as Huguenots. However, she failed to fully grasp the theological issues that drove their movement. Later, she resorted in frustration and anger to hardline policies against them, also pleasing the hardline Catholic party. In return, she was blamed for the persecutions carried out under her sons' rule, in particular the St. Bartholomew's Day massacre of 1572, during which thousands of Huguenots were killed in France.

Some historians have excused Catherine from blame for the worst decisions of the crown, but evidence for her ruthlessness can be found in her letters. In practice, her authority was limited by the effects of the civil wars, and she suffers in comparison to what might have been had her husband the king lived to take responsibility or stabilise the country. Therefore, her policies may be seen as desperate measures to keep the House of Valois on the throne at all costs and her patronage of the arts as an attempt to glorify a monarchy whose prestige was in steep decline. Without Catherine, it is unlikely that her sons would have remained in power. Catherine has been called "the most important woman in Europe" in the 16th century.

== Birth and upbringing ==
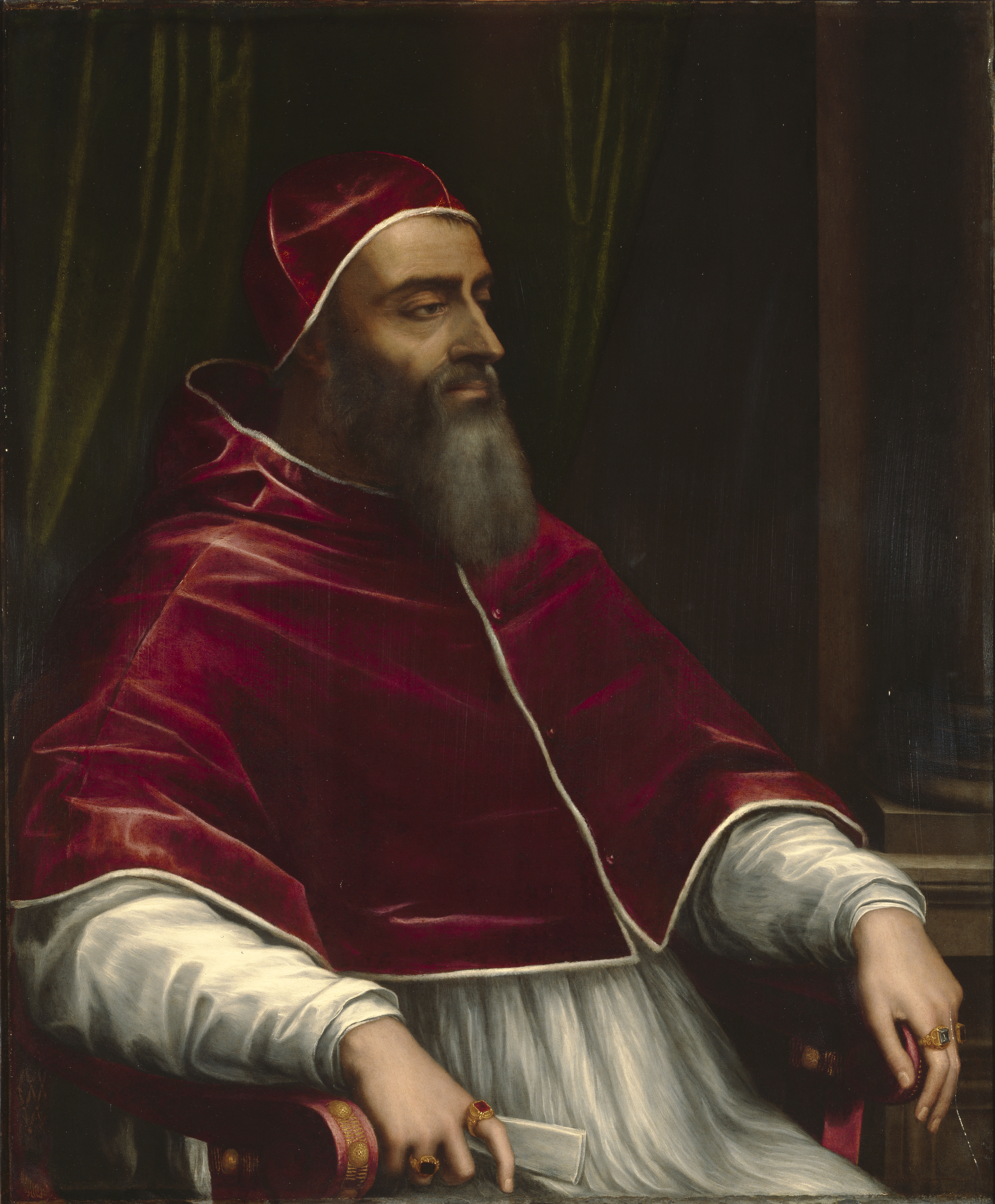
Giulio di Giuliano de' Medici, Pope Clement VII, by Sebastiano del Piombo, c.1531. Clement called Catherine's betrothal to Henry of Orléans "the greatest match in the world".

Catherine de' Medici was born Caterina Maria Romula de' Medici on 13 April 1519 in Florence, Republic of Florence, the only child of Lorenzo de' Medici, Duke of Urbino, and Madeleine de la Tour d'Auvergne, the countess of Boulogne. The young couple had been married the year before at Amboise as part of the alliance between King Francis I of France and Lorenzo's uncle Pope Leo X against the Holy Roman Emperor Maximilian I. According to a contemporary chronicler, when Catherine was born, her parents were "as pleased as if it had been a boy".

Within a month of Catherine's birth, both her parents died: Madeleine died on 28 April of puerperal fever, and Lorenzo died on 4 May. King Francis wanted Catherine to be raised at the French court, but Pope Leo refused, claiming he wanted her to marry Ippolito de' Medici. Leo made Catherine Duchess of Urbino but annexed most of the Duchy of Urbino to the Papal States, permitting Florence to keep only the Fortress of San Leo. It was only after Leo's death in 1521, that his successor, Adrian VI, restored the duchy to its rightful owner, Francesco Maria I della Rovere.

Catherine was first cared for by her paternal grandmother, Alfonsina Orsini. After Alfonsina's death in 1520, Catherine joined her cousins and was raised by her aunt, Clarice de' Medici. The death of Pope Leo in 1521 briefly interrupted Medici power until Cardinal Giulio de' Medici was elected Pope Clement VII in 1523. Clement housed Catherine in the Palazzo Medici Riccardi in Florence, where she lived in state. The Florentine people called her duchessina ("the little duchess"), in deference to her unrecognised claim to the Duchy of Urbino.

In 1527, the Medici were overthrown in Florence by a faction opposed to the regime of Clement's representative, Cardinal Silvio Passerini, and Catherine was taken hostage and placed in a series of convents. The final one, the Santissima Annunziata delle Murate was her home for three years. Mark Strage described these years as "the happiest of her entire life". Clement had no choice but to crown Charles of Austria as Holy Roman Emperor in return for his help in retaking the city. In October 1529, Charles's troops laid siege to Florence. As the siege dragged on, voices called for the 10-year-old Catherine to be killed, stripped naked and chained to the city walls. Some even suggested that she be handed over to the troops to be raped. The city finally surrendered on 12 August 1530. Clement summoned Catherine from her beloved convent to join him in Rome where he greeted her with open arms and tears in his eyes. Then he set about the business of finding her a husband.

== Marriage ==
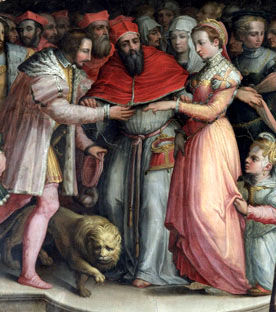
Catherine and Henry's marriage, painted seventeen years after the event

On her visit to Rome, the Venetians described Catherine as "small of stature, and thin, and without delicate features, but having the protruding eyes peculiar to the Medici family". Suitors, however, lined up for her hand, including James V of Scotland who sent the Duke of Albany to Clement to conclude a marriage in April and November 1530. When Francis I of France proposed his second son, Henry, Duke of Orléans, in early 1533, Clement jumped at the offer. Although distantly related in several ways, Henry was a prize catch for Catherine, whose Medici family, despite its wealth, was of common origin.

The wedding, a grand affair marked by extravagant display and gift-giving, took place in the Église Saint-Ferréol les Augustins in Marseille on 28 October 1533. Prince Henry danced and jousted for Catherine. The fourteen-year-old couple left their wedding ball at midnight to perform their nuptial duties. Henry arrived in the bedroom with King Francis, who is said to have stayed until the marriage was consummated. He noted that "each had shown valour in the joust". Clement visited the newlyweds in bed the next morning and added his blessings to the night's proceedings.

Catherine saw little of her husband in their first year of marriage, but the ladies of the court, impressed with her intelligence and keenness to please, treated her well. However, the death of her papal cousin on 25 September 1534 undermined Catherine's standing in the French court. The next pope, Alessandro Farnese, was elected on 13 October and took the title Paul III. As a Farnese he felt no obligation to keep Clement's promises, broke the alliance with Francis and refused to continue paying her huge dowry. King Francis lamented, "The girl has come to me stark naked."

Prince Henry showed no interest in Catherine as a wife; instead, he openly took mistresses. For the first ten years of the marriage, the royal couple failed to produce any children together. In 1537, he had a brief affair with Philippa Duci, who gave birth to a daughter, whom he publicly acknowledged. This proved that Henry was fertile and added to the pressure on Catherine to produce a child.

=== Dauphine ===
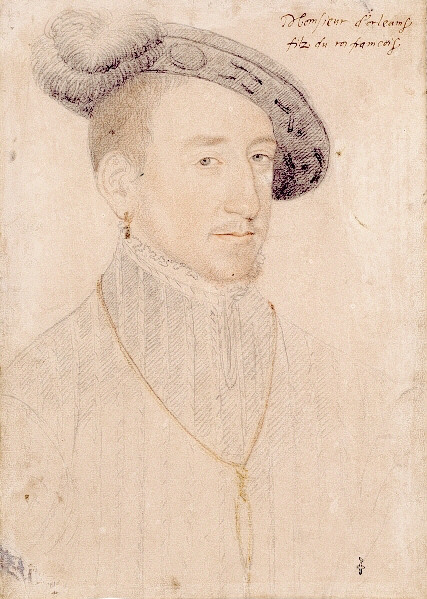
Henry, Duke of Orléans, by Corneille de Lyon. During his childhood, Henry spent almost four and a half years as a hostage in Spain, an ordeal that marked him for life, leaving him introverted and gloomy.

In 1536, Henry's older brother, Francis, caught a chill after a game of tennis, contracted a fever and died shortly after, leaving Henry the heir. Suspicions of poison abounded, from Catherine to Emperor Charles V. Sebastiano de Montecuccoli confessed under torture to poisoning the Dauphin.

As dauphine, Catherine was expected to provide a future heir to the throne. According to the court chronicler Brantôme, "many people advised the king and the Dauphin to repudiate her, since it was necessary to continue the line of France". Divorce was discussed. In desperation, Catherine tried every known trick for getting pregnant, such as placing cow dung and ground stags' antlers on her "source of life", and drinking mule's urine. On 19 January 1544 she at last gave birth to a son, named after King Francis.

After becoming pregnant once, Catherine had no trouble doing so again. She may have owed her change of fortune to the physician Jean Fernel, who allegedly noticed slight abnormalities in the couple's sexual organs and advised them how to solve the problem. However, he denied ever providing such advice. Catherine quickly conceived again and on 2 April 1545 she bore a daughter, Elisabeth. She went on to bear Henry a further eight children, five of whom survived infancy: the future Charles IX (born 27 June 1550); the future Henry III (born 19 September 1551); and Francis, Duke of Anjou (born 18 March 1555), Claude (born 12 November 1547) and Margaret (born 14 May 1553). The long-term future of the Valois dynasty, which had ruled France since the 14th century, seemed assured.

However, Catherine's ability to bear children failed to improve her marriage. About 1538, at the age of 19, Henry had taken as his mistress the 38-year-old Diane de Poitiers, whom he adored for the rest of his life. Even so, he respected Catherine's status as his consort. When King Francis I died on 31 March 1547, Catherine became queen consort of France. She was crowned in the Basilica of Saint-Denis on 10 June 1549.

=== Queen of France ===
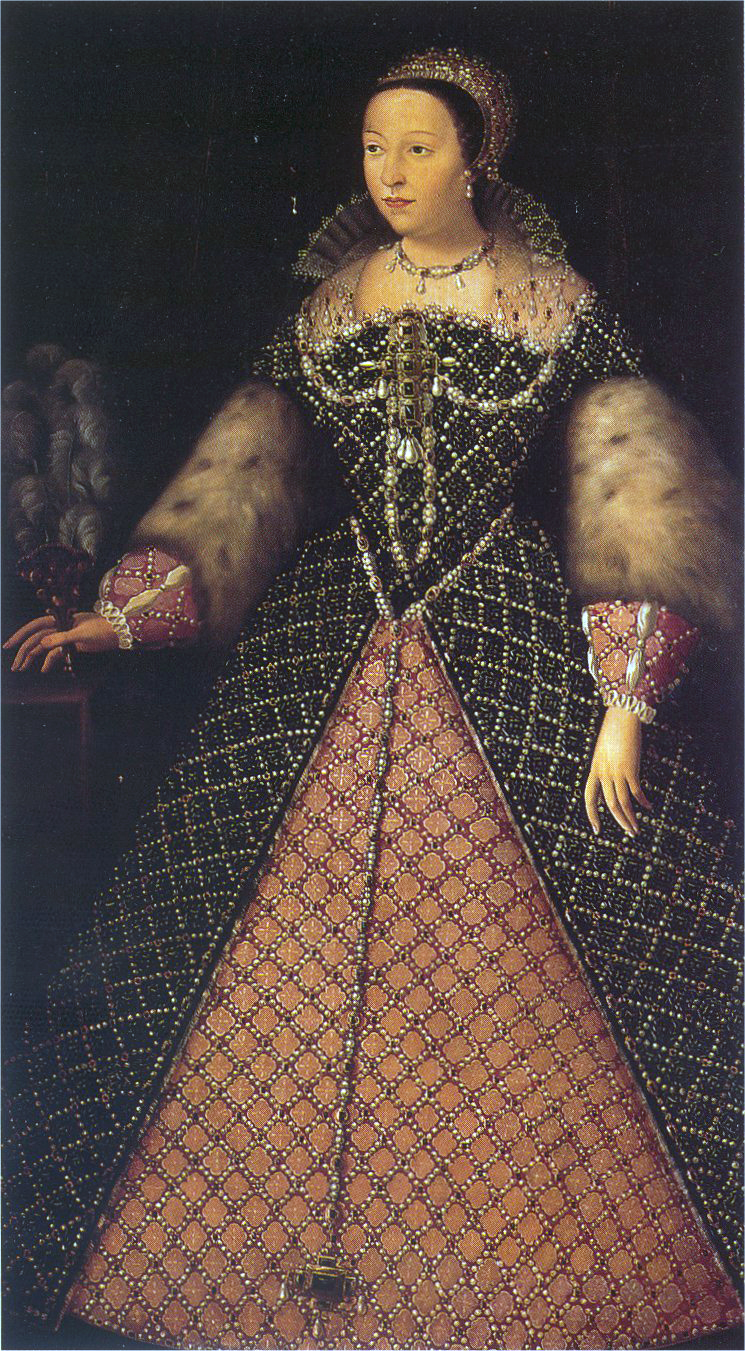
Catherine de' Medici (age 30s), as queen consort of France (1550s). Portrait at the Uffizi Gallery. As Catherine approached 40 years of age, a Venetian envoy essayed his impression: "Her mouth is too large and her eyes too prominent and colourless for beauty [...] but a very distinguished-looking woman, with a shapely figure, a beautiful skin and exquisitely shaped hands."

Henry hardly allowed Catherine any political influence as queen. Although she sometimes acted as regent during his absences from France, her formal powers were strictly nominal. Henry even gave the Château of Chenonceau, which Catherine had wanted for herself, to his mistress Diane de Poitiers instead, who took her place at the centre of power, dispensing patronage and accepting favours. The imperial ambassador reported that in the presence of guests, Henry would sit on Diane's lap and play the guitar, chat about politics, or fondle her breasts. Diane never regarded Catherine as a threat. She even encouraged the king to spend more time with Catherine and sire more children.

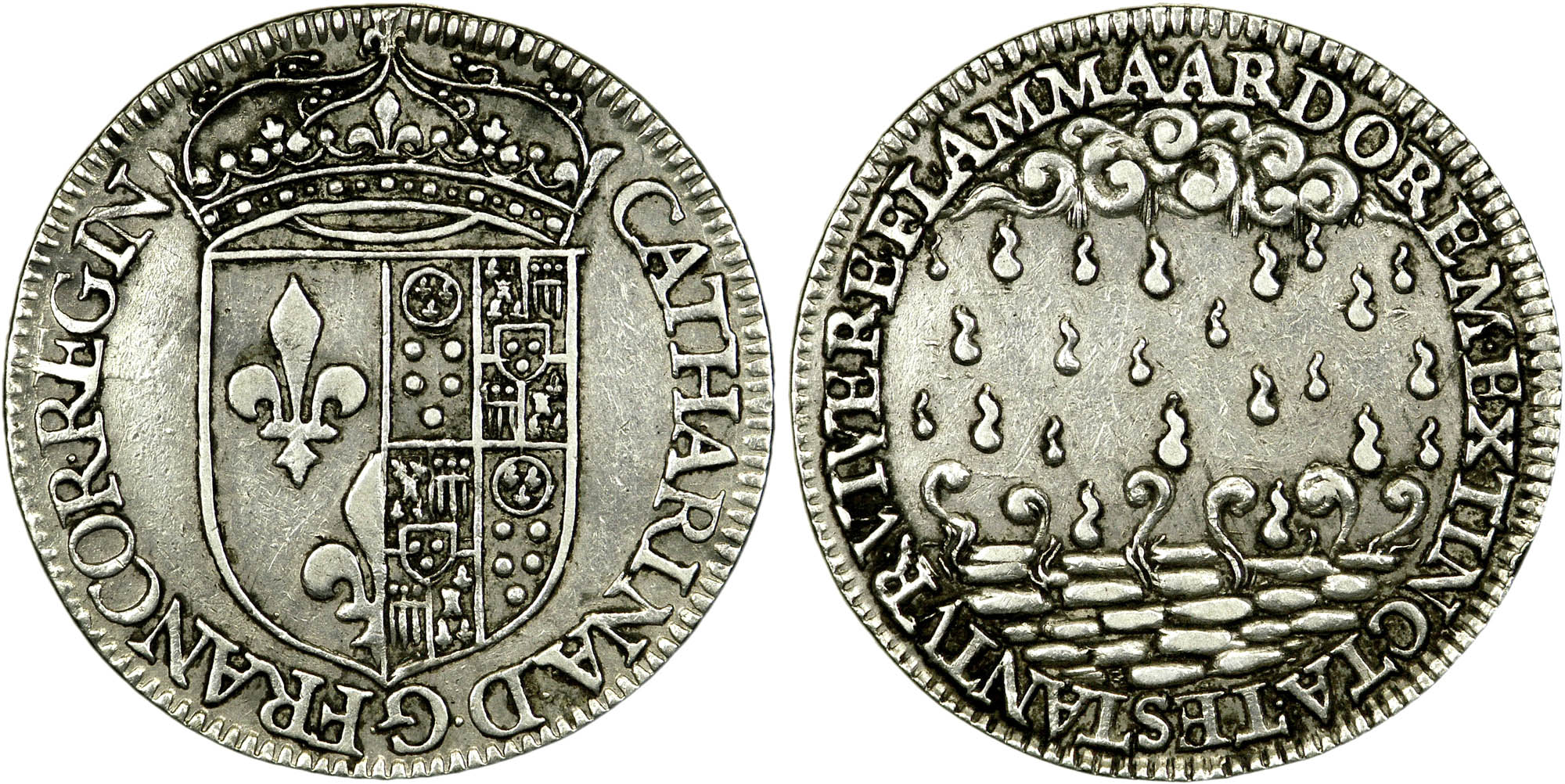
Silver jeton of Catherine de'Médici

In 1556, Catherine nearly died giving birth to twin daughters, Jeanne and Victoire. Surgeons saved her life by breaking Jeanne's legs; Jeanne consequently died in utero. The surviving daughter, Victoire, died seven weeks later. Their birth nearly cost Catherine her life, and she had no more children.

Henry's reign enabled the rise of the Guise brothers, Charles, who became a cardinal, and Henry's boyhood friend Francis, both of whom became Duke of Guise. Their sister Mary of Guise had married James V of Scotland in 1538 and was the mother of Mary, Queen of Scots. At the age of five and a half, Mary was brought to the French court, where she was betrothed to the Dauphin, Francis. Catherine brought her up with her own children at the French court, while Mary of Guise governed Scotland as her daughter's regent.

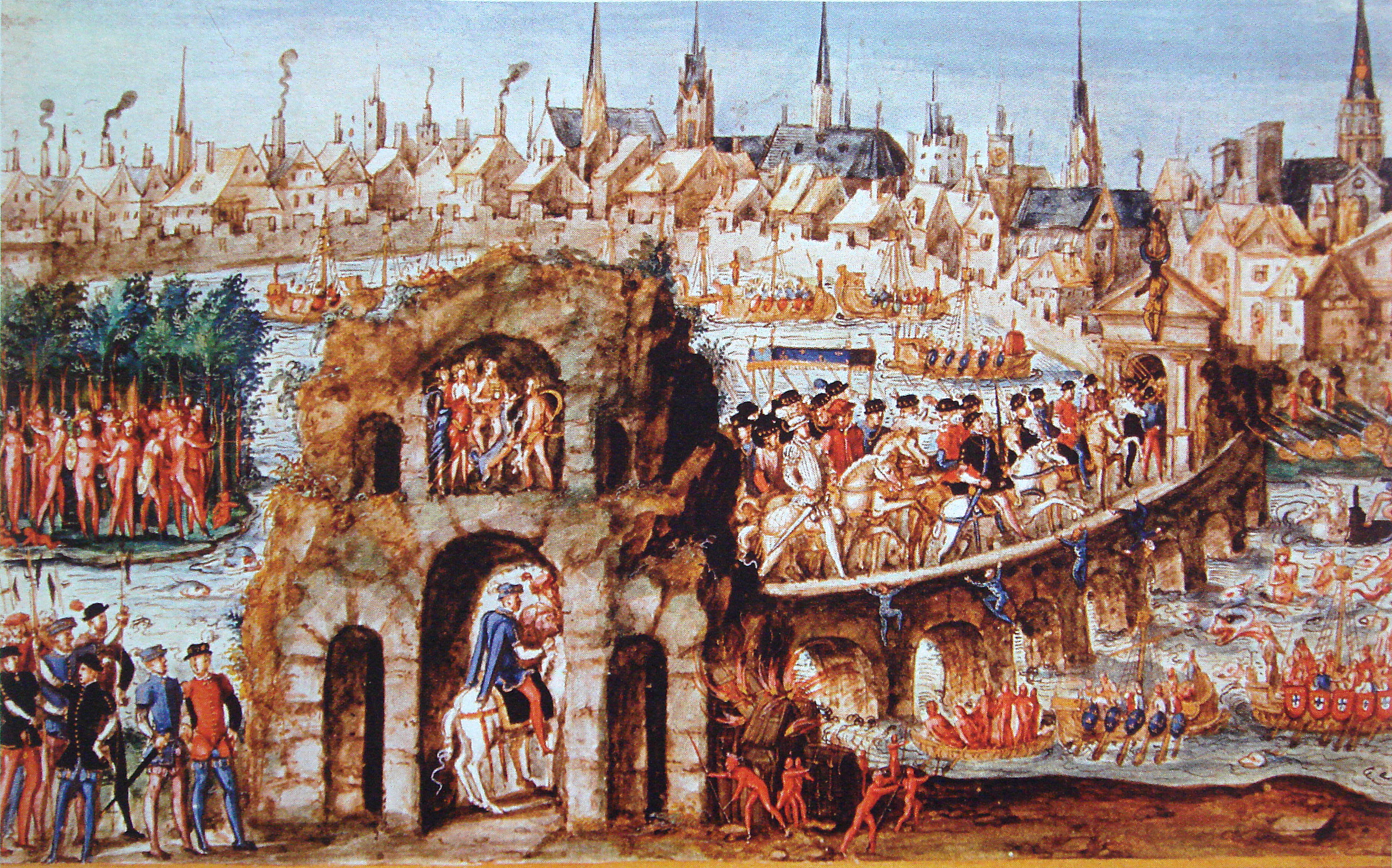
"Brazilian ball" for Henry II and Catherine de' Medici in Rouen, 1 October 1550, a precursor to the creation of France Antarctique in Brazil

On 3–4 April 1559 Henry signed the Peace of Cateau-Cambrésis with the Holy Roman Empire and England, ending a long period of Italian Wars. The treaty was sealed by the betrothal of Catherine's teenage daughter Elisabeth, aged 13, to Philip II of Spain. Their proxy wedding was celebrated in Paris on 22 June 1559. As part of the celebrations, a jousting tournament was held on 30 June 1559.

King Henry took part in the jousting, sporting Diane's black-and-white colours. He defeated the dukes of Guise and Nemours, but the young Gabriel, comte de Montgomery, knocked him half out of the saddle. Henry insisted on riding against Montgomery again, and this time, Montgomery's lance shattered in the king's face. Henry reeled out of the clash, his face pouring blood, with splinters "of a good bigness" sticking out of his eye and head. Catherine, Diane, and Prince Francis all fainted. Henry was carried to the Château de Tournelles, where five splinters of wood were extracted from his head, one of which had pierced his eye and brain. Catherine stayed by his bedside, but Diane kept away, "for fear", in the words of a chronicler, "of being expelled by the Queen". For the next ten days, Henry's state fluctuated. At times he even felt well enough to dictate letters and listen to music. Slowly, however, he lost his sight, speech, and reason, and on 10 July 1559, he died, aged 40. From that day, Catherine took a broken lance as her emblem, inscribed with the words "lacrymae hinc, hinc dolor" ("from this come my tears and my pain"), and wore black mourning in memory of Henry.

== Queen mother ==
=== Reign of Francis II ===
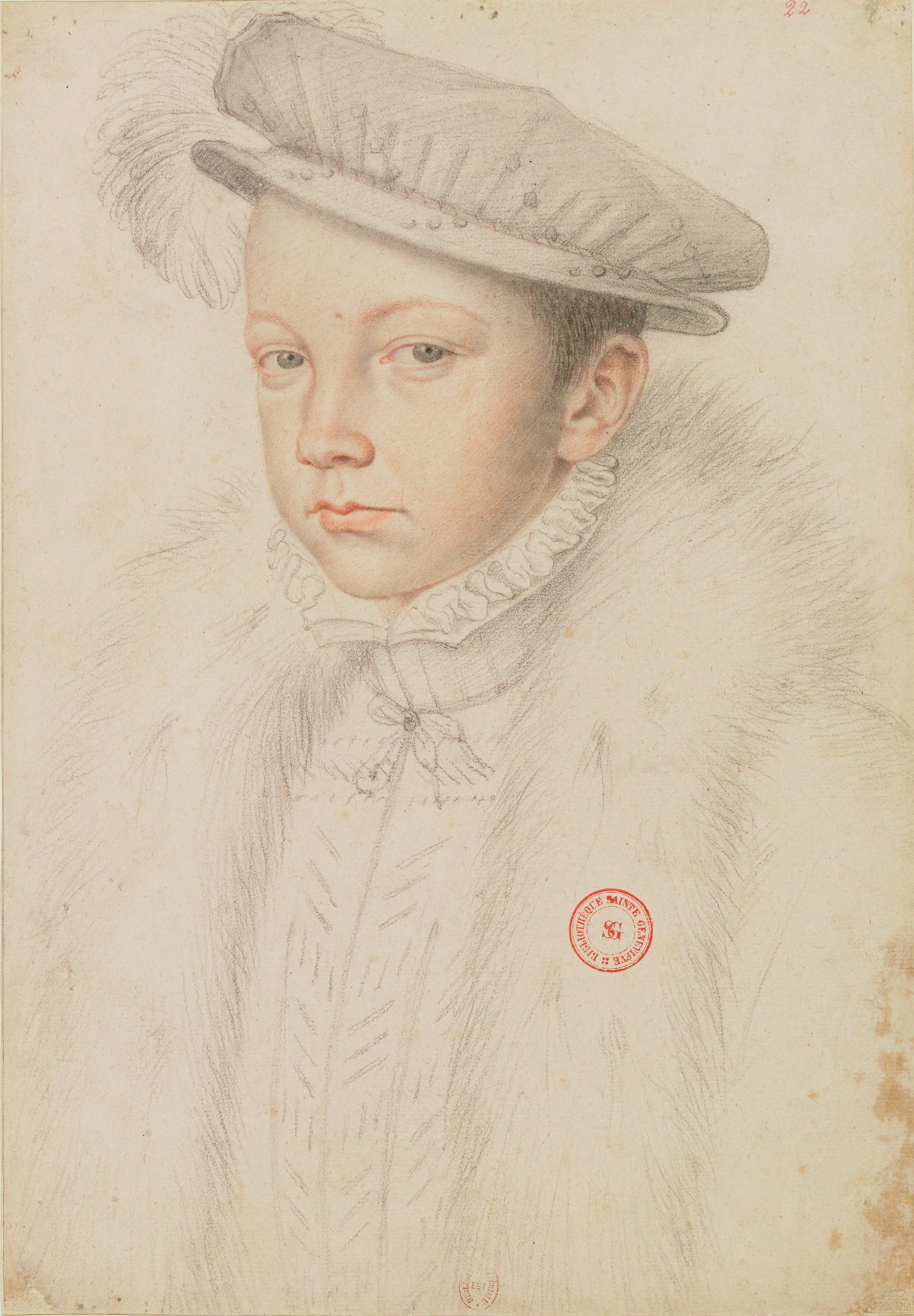
Francis II of France, by François Clouet, 1560. Francis found the crown so heavy at his coronation that four nobles had to hold it in place as he walked up the steps to his throne.

Francis II became king at the age of fifteen. In what has been called a coup d'état, the Cardinal of Lorraine and the Duke of Guise—whose niece, Mary, Queen of Scots, had married Francis II the year before—seized power the day after Henry II's death and quickly moved themselves into the Louvre Palace with the young couple. The English ambassador reported a few days later that "the house of Guise ruleth and doth all about the French king". For the moment, Catherine worked with the Guises out of necessity. She was not strictly entitled to a role in Francis's government, because he was deemed old enough to rule for himself. Nevertheless, all his official acts began with the words: "This being the good pleasure of the Queen, my lady-mother, and I also approving of every opinion that she holdeth, am content and command that ...". Catherine did not hesitate to exploit her new authority. One of her first acts was to force Diane de Poitiers to hand over the crown jewels and return the Château de Chenonceau to the crown. She later did her best to efface or outdo Diane's building work there.

The Guise brothers set about persecuting the Protestants with zeal. Catherine adopted a moderate stance and spoke against the Guise persecutions, though she had no particular sympathy for the Huguenots, whose beliefs she never shared. The Protestants looked for leadership first to Antoine de Bourbon, King of Navarre, the First Prince of the Blood, and then, with more success, to his brother, Louis de Bourbon, Prince of Condé, who backed the Amboise conspiracy, a plot to overthrow the Guises by force. When the Guises heard of the plot, they moved the court to the fortified Château of Amboise. The Duke of Guise launched an attack into the woods around the château. His troops surprised the rebels and killed many of them on the spot, including the commander, La Renaudie. Others they drowned in the river or strung up around the battlements while Catherine and the court watched.

In June 1560, Michel de l'Hôpital was appointed Chancellor of France. He sought the support of France's constitutional bodies and worked closely with Catherine to defend the law in the face of the growing anarchy. Neither saw the need to punish Protestants who worshipped in private and did not take up arms. On 20 August 1560, Catherine and the chancellor advocated this policy to an Assembly of Notables at Fontainebleau. Historians regard the occasion as an early example of Catherine's statesmanship. Meanwhile, Condé raised an army and in autumn 1560 began attacking towns in the south. Catherine ordered him to court and had him imprisoned as soon as he arrived. He was tried in November, found guilty of offences against the crown, and sentenced to death. His life was saved by the illness and death of the king, as a result of an infection or an abscess in his ear.

When Catherine realized Francis was going to die, she made a pact with Antoine de Bourbon by which he would renounce his right to the regency of the future king, Charles IX, in return for the release of his brother Condé. As a result, when Francis died on 5 December 1560, the Privy Council appointed Catherine as governor of France (gouvernante de France), with sweeping powers. She wrote to her daughter Elisabeth: "My principal aim is to have the honour of God before my eyes in all things and to preserve my authority, not for myself, but for the conservation of this kingdom and for the good of all your brothers".

=== Reign of Charles IX ===
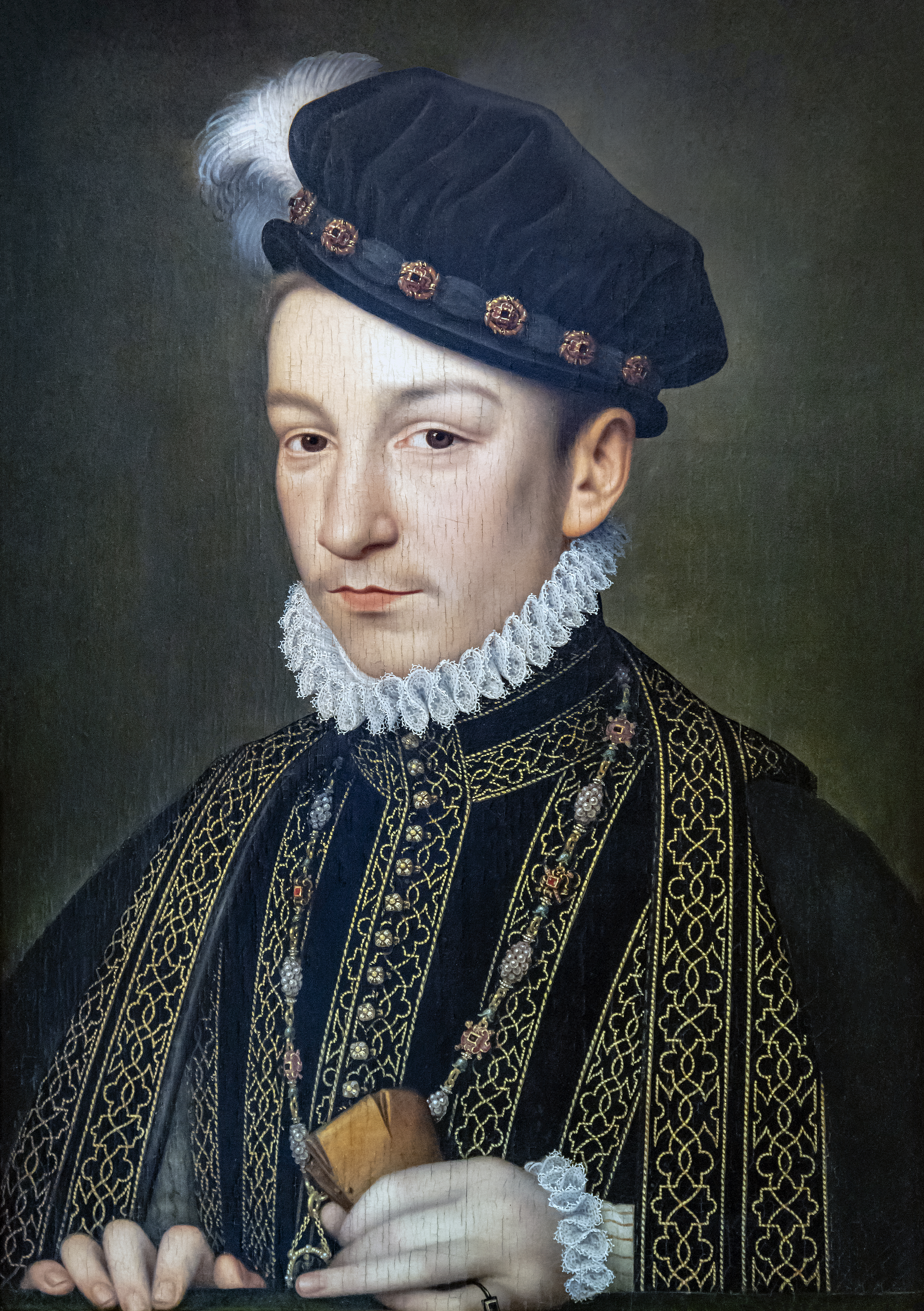
Charles IX of France, after François Clouet, c. 1565. The Venetian ambassador Giovanni Michiel described Charles as "an admirable child, with fine eyes, gracious movements, though he is not robust. He favours physical exercise that is too violent for his health, for he suffers from shortness of breath".

Charles IX was ten years old at the time of his royal consecration, during which he cried. At first Catherine kept him very close to her, and even slept in his chamber. She presided over his council, decided policy, and controlled state business and patronage. However, she was never in a position to control the country as a whole, which was on the brink of civil war. In many parts of France the rule of nobles held sway rather than that of the crown. The challenges Catherine faced were complex and, in some ways, difficult for her to comprehend as a foreigner.

She summoned church leaders from both sides to attempt to solve their doctrinal differences. Despite her optimism, the resulting Colloquy of Poissy ended in failure on 13 October 1561, dissolving itself without her permission. Catherine failed because she saw the religious divide only in political terms. In the words of historian R. J. Knecht, "she underestimated the strength of religious conviction, imagining that all would be well if only she could get the party leaders to agree". In January 1562, Catherine issued the tolerant Edict of Saint-Germain in a further attempt to build bridges with the Protestants. On 1 March 1562, however, in an incident known as the Massacre of Vassy, the Duke of Guise and his men attacked worshipping Huguenots in a barn at Vassy, killing 74 and wounding 104. Guise, who called the massacre "a regrettable accident", was cheered as a hero in the streets of Paris while the Huguenots called for revenge. The massacre lit the fuse that sparked the French Wars of Religion. For the next thirty years, France found itself in a state of either civil war or armed truce.

Within a month Louis de Bourbon, Prince of Condé, and Admiral Gaspard de Coligny had raised an army of 1,800. They formed an alliance with England and seized town after town in France. Catherine met Coligny, but he refused to back down. She therefore told him: "Since you rely on your forces, we will show you ours". The royal army struck back quickly and laid siege to Huguenot-held Rouen. Catherine visited the deathbed of Antoine de Bourbon, King of Navarre, after he was fatally wounded by an arquebus shot. Catherine insisted on visiting the field herself and when warned of the dangers laughed, "My courage is as great as yours". The Catholics took Rouen, but their triumph was short-lived. On 18 February 1563, a spy called Poltrot de Méré fired an arquebus into the back of the Duke of Guise, at the siege of Orléans. The murder triggered an aristocratic blood feud that complicated the French civil wars for years to come. Catherine, however, was delighted with the death of her ally. "If Monsieur de Guise had perished sooner", she told the Venetian ambassador, "peace would have been achieved more quickly". On 19 March 1563, the Edict of Amboise, also known as the Edict of Pacification, ended the war. Catherine now rallied both Huguenot and Catholic forces to retake Le Havre from the English.

==== Huguenots ====
On 17 August 1563, Charles IX was declared of age at the Parlement of Rouen, but he was never able to rule on his own and showed little interest in government. Catherine decided to launch a drive to enforce the Edict of Amboise and revive loyalty to the crown. To this end, she set out with Charles and the court on a progress around France that lasted from January 1564 until May 1565. Catherine held talks with Jeanne d'Albret, the Protestant queen regnant of Navarre (and the wife of Antoine de Bourbon) at Mâcon and Nérac. She also met her daughter Elisabeth at Bayonne near the Spanish border, amidst lavish court festivities. Philip II excused himself from the occasion. He sent the Duke of Alba to tell Catherine to scrap the Edict of Amboise and to find punitive solutions to the problem of heresy.

In 1566, through the ambassador to the Ottoman Empire, Guillaume de Grandchamp de Grantrie, and because of a long-standing Franco-Ottoman alliance, Charles and Catherine proposed to the Ottoman Court a plan to resettle French Huguenots and French and German Lutherans in Ottoman-controlled Moldavia, in order to create a military colony and a buffer against the Habsburg. This plan also had the added advantage of removing the Huguenots from France, but it failed to interest the Ottomans.

On 27 September 1567, in a swoop known as the Surprise of Meaux, Huguenot forces attempted to ambush the king, triggering renewed civil war. Taken unawares, the court fled to Paris in disarray. The war was ended by the Peace of Longjumeau of 22–23 March 1568, but civil unrest and bloodshed continued. The Surprise of Meaux marked a turning point in Catherine's policy towards the Huguenots. From that moment, she abandoned compromise for a policy of repression. She told the Venetian ambassador in June 1568 that all one could expect from Huguenots was deceit, and she praised the Duke of Alba's reign of terror in the Netherlands, where Calvinists and rebels were put to death in the thousands.

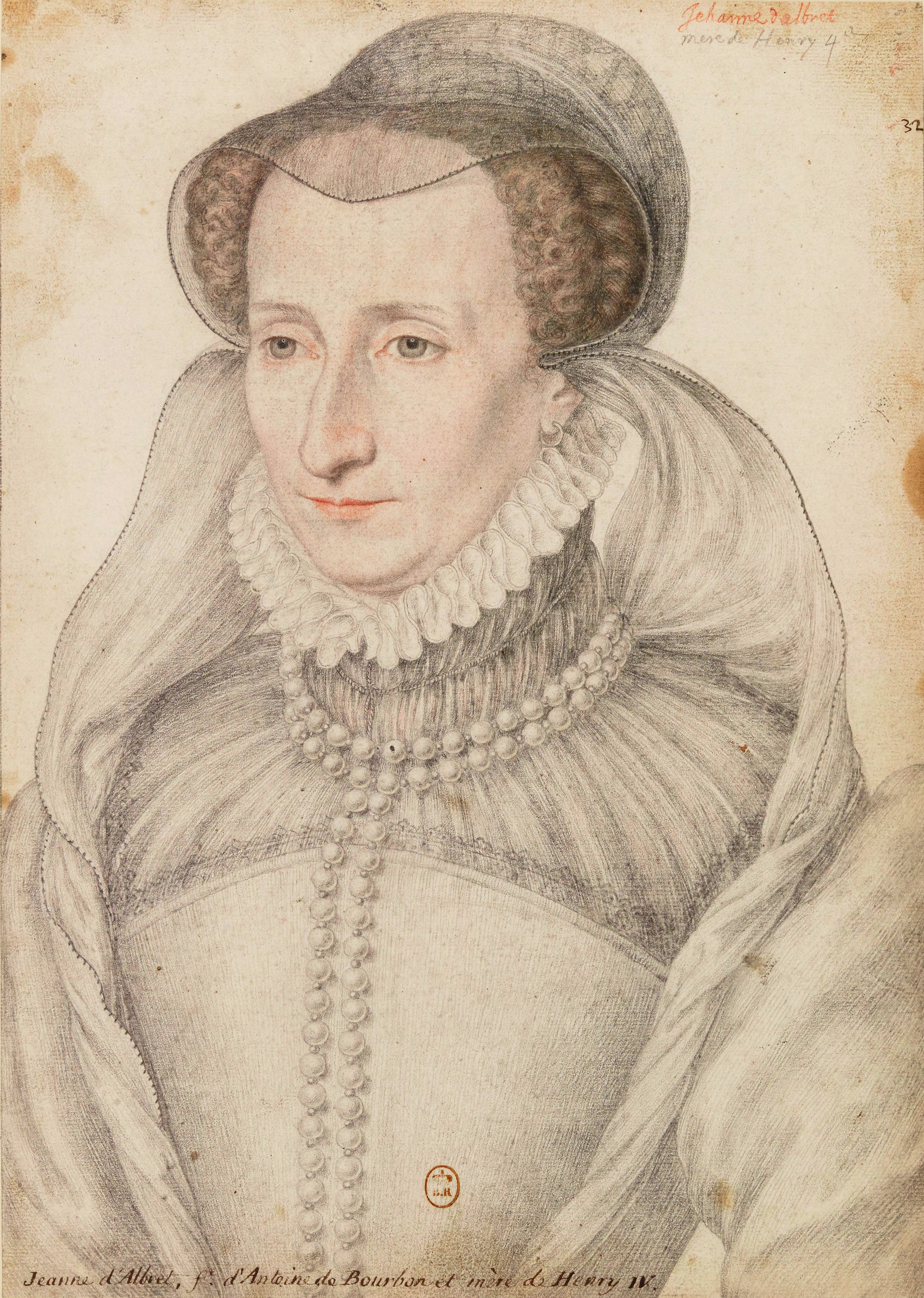
Jeanne d'Albret, Queen of Navarre, by François Clouet, 1570. She wrote to her son, Henry, in 1572: "All she [Catherine] does is mock me, and afterwards tells others exactly the opposite of what I have said ... she denies everything, laughing in my face ... she treats me so shamefully that the patience I manage to maintain surpasses that of Griselda".

The Huguenots retreated to the fortified stronghold of La Rochelle on the west coast, where Jeanne d'Albret and her fifteen-year-old son, Henry of Bourbon, joined them. "We have come to the determination to die, all of us", Jeanne wrote to Catherine, "rather than abandon our God, and our religion." Catherine called Jeanne, whose decision to rebel posed a dynastic threat to the Valois, "the most shameless woman in the world". Nevertheless, the Peace of Saint-Germain-en-Laye, signed on 8 August 1570 because the royal army ran out of cash, conceded wider toleration to the Huguenots than ever before.

Catherine looked to further Valois interests by grand dynastic marriages. In 1570, Charles IX married Elisabeth of Austria, daughter of Maximilian II, Holy Roman Emperor. Catherine was also eager for a match between one of her two youngest sons and Elizabeth I of England. After Catherine's daughter Elisabeth died in childbirth in 1568, she had touted her youngest daughter Margaret as a bride for Philip II of Spain. Now she sought a marriage between Margaret and Henry III of Navarre, Jeanne's son, with the aim of uniting Valois and Bourbon interests. Margaret, however, was secretly involved with Henry of Guise, the son of the late Duke of Guise. When Catherine found this out, she had her daughter brought from her bed. Catherine and the king then beat her, ripping her nightclothes and pulling out handfuls of her hair.

Catherine pressed Jeanne d'Albret to attend court. Writing that she wanted to see Jeanne's children, she promised not to harm them. Jeanne replied: "Pardon me if, reading that, I want to laugh, because you want to relieve me of a fear that I've never had. I've never thought that, as they say, you eat little children." When Jeanne did come to court, Catherine pressured her hard, playing on Jeanne's hopes for her beloved son. Jeanne finally agreed to the marriage between her son and Margaret, so long as Henry could remain a Huguenot. When Jeanne arrived in Paris to buy clothes for the wedding, she was taken ill and died on 9 June 1572, aged forty-three. Huguenot writers later accused Catherine of murdering her with poisoned gloves. The wedding took place on 18 August 1572 at Notre-Dame, Paris.

==== St. Bartholomew's Day massacre ====
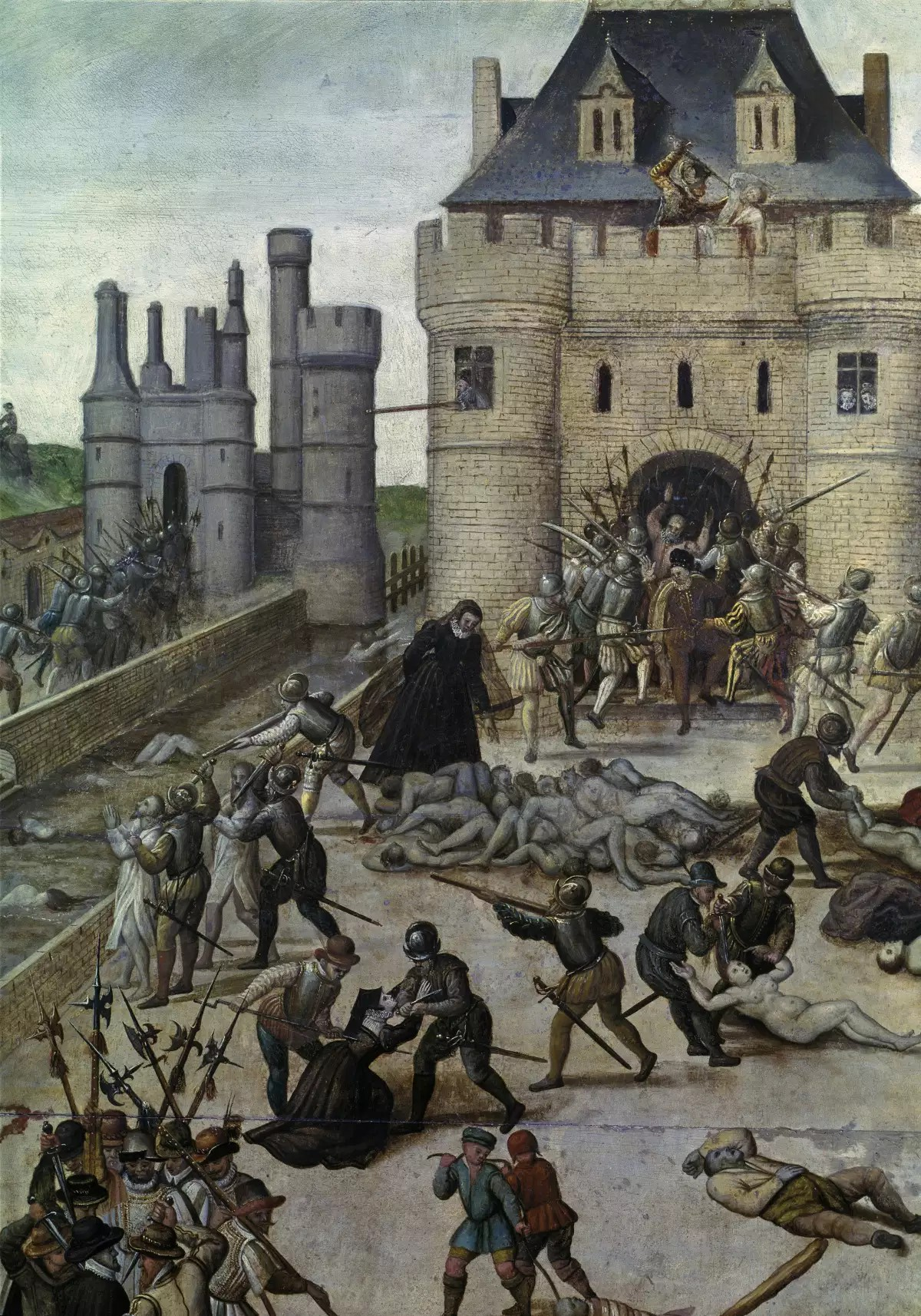
The detail depicts Catherine inspecting corpses as Huguenots were being massacred outside the Louvre Palace in The Saint Bartholomew's Day Massacre by François Dubois (d. 1584). Dubois was a Huguenot who fled France after the massacre, although it is not known whether he witnessed the event.

Three days later, Admiral Coligny was walking back to his rooms from the Louvre when a shot rang out from a house and wounded him in the hand and arm. A smoking arquebus was discovered in a window, but the culprit had made his escape from the rear of the building on a waiting horse. Coligny was carried to his lodgings at the Hôtel de Béthisy, where the surgeon Ambroise Paré removed a bullet from his elbow and amputated a damaged finger with a pair of scissors. Catherine, who was said to have received the news without emotion, made a tearful visit to Coligny and promised to punish his attacker. Many historians have blamed Catherine for the attack on Coligny. Others point to the Guise family or a Spanish-papal plot to end Coligny's influence on the king. Whatever the truth, the bloodbath that followed was soon beyond the control of Catherine or any other leader.

The St. Bartholomew's Day massacre, which began two days later, has stained Catherine's reputation ever since. There is reason to believe she was party to the decision when on 23 August Charles IX is said to have ordered, "Then kill them all! Kill them all!" Historians have suggested that Catherine and her advisers expected a Huguenot uprising to avenge the attack on Coligny. They chose therefore to strike first and wipe out the Huguenot leaders while they were still in Paris after the wedding.

The slaughter in Paris lasted for almost a week. It spread to many parts of France, where it persisted into the autumn. In the words of historian Jules Michelet, "St Bartholomew was not a day, but a season". On 29 September, when Navarre knelt before the altar as a Roman Catholic, having converted to avoid being killed, Catherine turned to the ambassadors and laughed. From this time dates the legend of the wicked Italian queen. Huguenot writers branded Catherine a scheming Italian, who had acted on Machiavelli's principles to kill all enemies in one blow.

=== Reign of Henry III ===
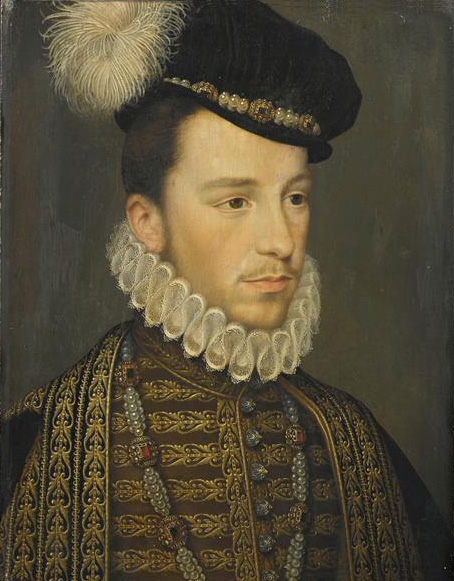
Henry, Duke of Anjou, by Jean de Court, c. 1573. As Henry III, he often showed more interest in pious devotions than in government.

Two years later, Catherine faced a new crisis with the death of Charles IX at the age of twenty-three. His dying words were "oh, my mother ..." The day before he died, he named Catherine regent, since his brother and heir, Henry the Duke of Anjou, was in the Polish–Lithuanian Commonwealth, where he had been elected king the year before. However, three months after his coronation at Wawel Cathedral, Henry abandoned that throne and returned to France in order to become King of France. Catherine wrote to Henry of Charles IX's death: "I am grief-stricken to have witnessed such a scene and the love which he showed me at the end ... My only consolation is to see you here soon, as your kingdom requires, and in good health, for if I were to lose you, I would have myself buried alive with you."

Henry was Catherine's favourite son. Unlike his brothers, he came to the throne as a grown man. He was also healthier, though he suffered from weak lungs and constant fatigue. His interest in the tasks of government, however, proved fitful. He depended on Catherine and her team of secretaries until the last few weeks of her life. He often hid from state affairs, immersing himself in acts of piety, such as pilgrimages and flagellation.

Henry married Louise de Lorraine-Vaudémont in February 1575, two days after his coronation. His choice thwarted Catherine's plans for a political marriage to a foreign princess. Rumours of Henry's inability to produce children were by that time in wide circulation. The papal nuncio Salviati observed, "it is only with difficulty that we can imagine there will be offspring ... physicians and those who know him well say that he has an extremely weak constitution and will not live long." As time passed and the likelihood of children from the marriage receded, Catherine's youngest son, Francis, Duke of Alençon, known as "Monsieur", played upon his role as heir to the throne, repeatedly exploiting the anarchy of the civil wars, which were by now as much about noble power struggles as religion. Catherine did all in her power to bring Francis back into the fold. On one occasion, in March 1578, she lectured him for six hours about his dangerously subversive behaviour.

In 1576, in a move that endangered Henry's throne, Francis allied with the Protestant princes against the crown. On 6 May 1576, Catherine gave in to almost all Huguenot demands in the Edict of Beaulieu. The treaty became known as the Peace of Monsieur because it was thought that Francis had forced it on the crown. Francis died of consumption in June 1584, after a disastrous intervention in the Low Countries during which his army had been massacred. Catherine wrote, the next day: "I am so wretched to live long enough to see so many people die before me, although I realize that God's will must be obeyed, that He owns everything, and that He lends us only for as long as He likes the children whom He gives us." The death of her youngest son was a calamity for Catherine's dynastic dreams. Under Salic law, by which only males could ascend the throne, the Huguenot Henry of Navarre now became heir presumptive to the French crown.

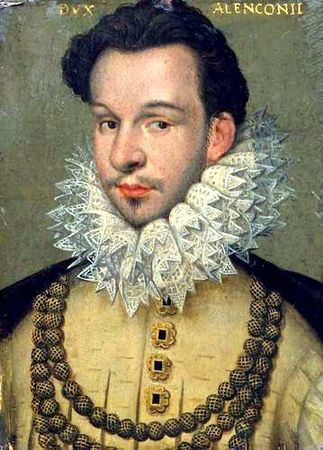
Catherine's youngest son, Francis, Duke of Alençon, by Nicholas Hilliard, c. 1577. Elizabeth of England called him "her frog" but found him "not so deformed" as she had been led to expect.

Catherine had at least taken the precaution of marrying Margaret, her youngest daughter, to Navarre. Margaret, however, became almost as much of a thorn in Catherine's side as Francis, and in 1582, she returned to the French court without her husband. Catherine was heard yelling at her for taking lovers. Catherine sent Pomponne de Bellièvre to Navarre to arrange Margaret's return. In 1585, Margaret fled Navarre again. She retreated to her property at Agen and begged her mother for money. Catherine sent her only enough "to put food on her table". Moving on to the fortress of Carlat, Margaret took a lover called d'Aubiac. Catherine asked Henry to act before Margaret brought shame on them again. In October 1586, therefore, he had Margaret locked up in the Château d'Usson. D'Aubiac was executed, though not, despite Catherine's wish, in front of Margaret. Catherine cut Margaret out of her will and never saw her again.

Catherine was unable to control Henry in the way she had Francis and Charles. Her role in his government became that of chief executive and roving diplomat. She travelled widely across the kingdom, enforcing his authority and trying to head off war. In 1578, she took on the task of pacifying the south. At the age of fifty-nine, she embarked on an eighteen-month journey around the south of France to meet Huguenot leaders face to face. Her efforts won Catherine new respect from the French people. On her return to Paris in 1579, she was greeted outside the city by the Parlement and crowds. The Venetian ambassador, Gerolamo Lipomanno, wrote: "She is an indefatigable princess, born to tame and govern a people as unruly as the French: they now recognize her merits, her concern for unity and are sorry not to have appreciated her sooner." She was under no illusions, however. On 25 November 1579, she wrote to the king, "You are on the eve of a general revolt. Anyone who tells you differently is a liar."

==== Catholic League ====
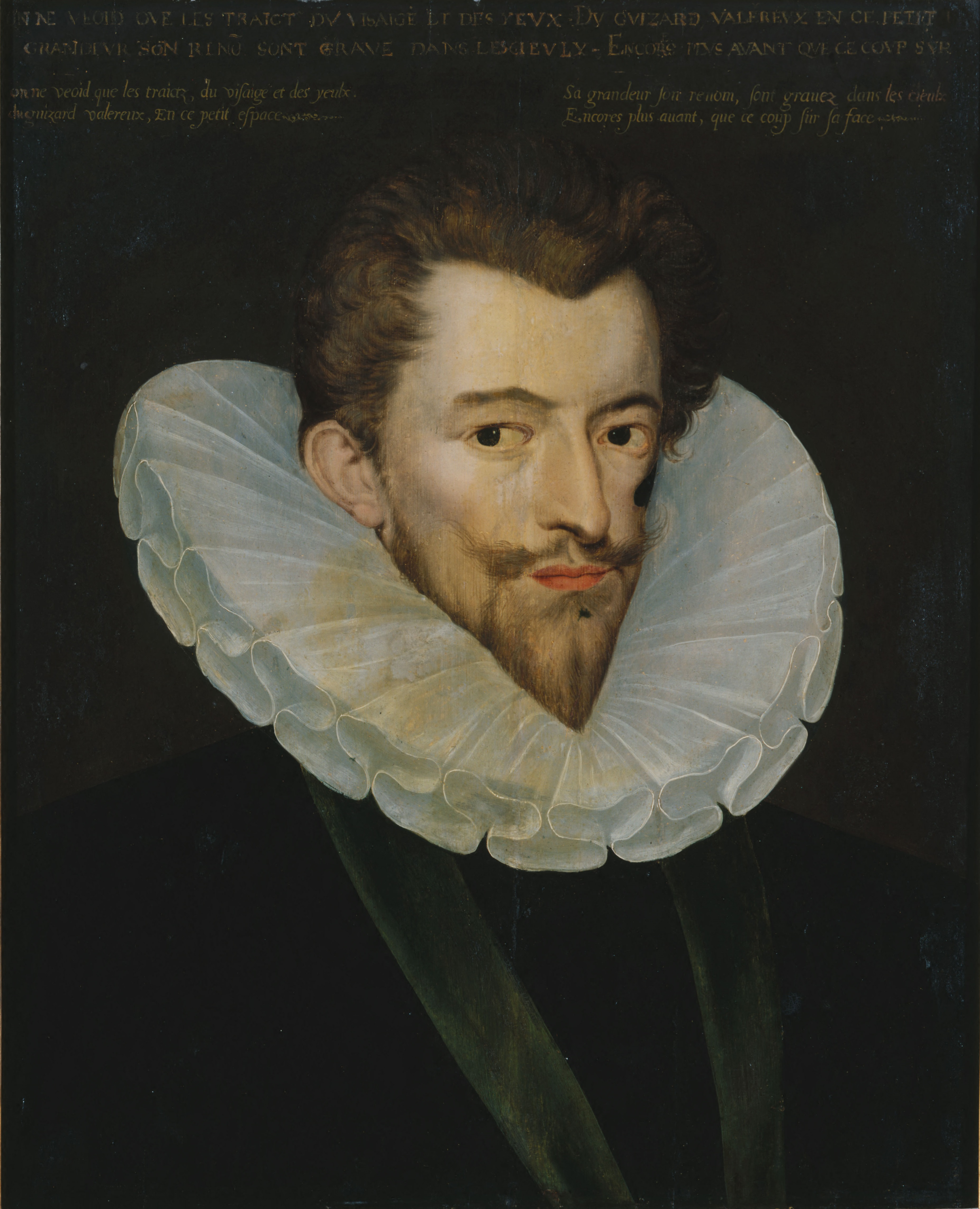
Henry, Duke of Guise, by Pierre Dumoûtier. Disarmed by Catherine's sweetness on meeting her for negotiations at Épernay in 1585, Guise tearfully insisted that his motives had been misunderstood. Catherine told him it would be better if he took off his boots and ate something, after which they could talk at length.

Many leading Roman Catholics were appalled by Catherine's attempts to appease the Huguenots. After the Edict of Beaulieu, they had started forming local leagues to protect their religion. The death of the heir to the throne in 1584 prompted the Duke of Guise to assume the leadership of the Catholic League. He planned to block Henry of Navarre's succession and place Henry's Catholic uncle Cardinal Charles de Bourbon on the throne instead. In this cause, he recruited the great Catholic princes, nobles and prelates, signed the treaty of Joinville with Spain, and prepared to make war on the "heretics". By 1585, Henry III had no choice but to go to war against the League. As Catherine put it, "peace is carried on a stick" (bâton porte paix). "Take care", she wrote to the king, "especially about your person. There is so much treachery about that I die of fear."

Henry was unable to fight the Catholics and the Protestants at once, both of whom had stronger armies than his own. In the Treaty of Nemours, signed on 7 July 1585, he was forced to give in to all the League's demands, even that he pay its troops. He went into hiding to fast and pray, surrounded by a bodyguard known as "the Forty-five", and left Catherine to sort out the mess. The monarchy had lost control of the country, and was in no position to assist England in the face of the coming Spanish attack. The Spanish ambassador told Philip II that the abscess was about to burst.

By 1587, the Catholic backlash against the Protestants had become a campaign across Europe. Elizabeth I of England's execution of Mary, Queen of Scots, on 8 February 1587 outraged the Catholic world. Philip II of Spain prepared for an invasion of England. The League took control of much of northern France to secure French ports for his armada.

==== Last months and death ====
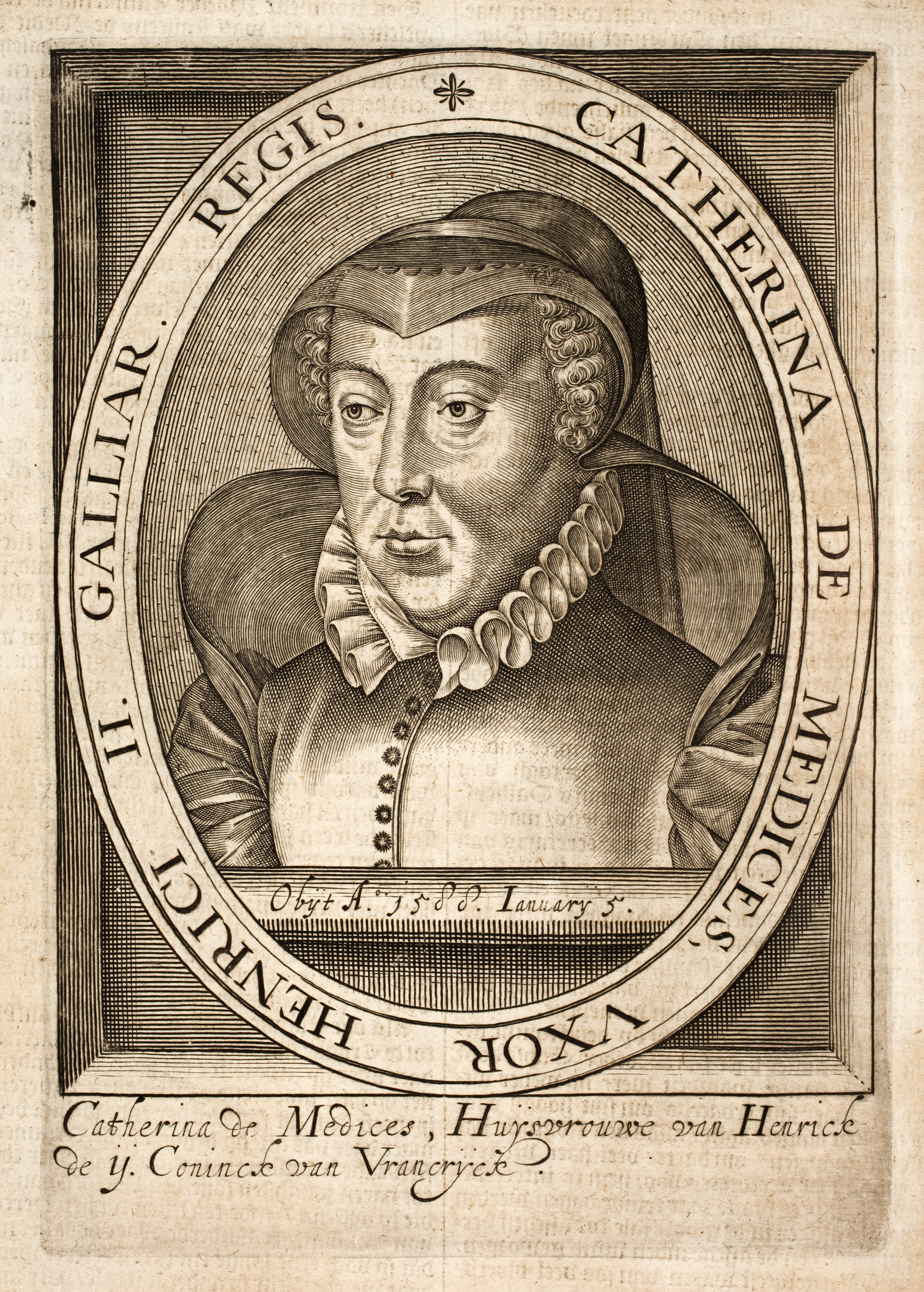
Engraving of Catherine de' Medici

Henry hired Swiss troops to help him defend himself in Paris. The Parisians, however, claimed the right to defend the city themselves. On 12 May 1588, they set up barricades in the streets and refused to take orders from anyone except the Duke of Guise. When Catherine tried to go to Mass, she found her way barred, though she was allowed through the barricades. The chronicler L'Estoile reported that she cried all through her lunch that day. She wrote to Bellièvre, "Never have I seen myself in such trouble or with so little light by which to escape." As usual, Catherine advised the king, who had fled the city in the nick of time, to compromise and live to fight another day. On 15 June 1588, Henry duly signed the Act of Union, which gave in to all the League's latest demands.

On 8 September 1588 at Blois, where the court had assembled for a meeting of the Estates, Henry dismissed all his ministers without warning. Catherine, in bed with a lung infection, had been kept in the dark. The king's actions effectively ended her days of power.

At the meeting of the Estates, Henry thanked Catherine for all she had done. He called her not only the mother of the king but the mother of the state. Henry did not tell Catherine of his plan for a solution to his problems. On 23 December 1588, he asked the Duke of Guise to call on him at the Château de Blois. As Guise entered the king's chamber, the Forty-five plunged their blades into his body, and he died at the foot of the king's bed. At the same moment, eight members of the Guise family were rounded up, including the Duke of Guise's brother, Louis II, Cardinal of Guise, whom Henry's men hacked to death the next day in the palace dungeons. Immediately after the murder of Guise, Henry entered Catherine's bedroom on the floor below and announced, "Please forgive me. Monsieur de Guise is dead. He will not be spoken of again. I have had him killed. I have done to him what he was going to do to me." Catherine's immediate reaction is not known; but on Christmas Day, she told a friar, "Oh, wretched man! What has he done? ... Pray for him ... I see him rushing towards his ruin." She visited her old friend Cardinal de Bourbon on 1 January 1589 to tell him she was sure he would soon be freed. He shouted at her, "Your words, Madam, have led us all to this butchery." She left in tears.

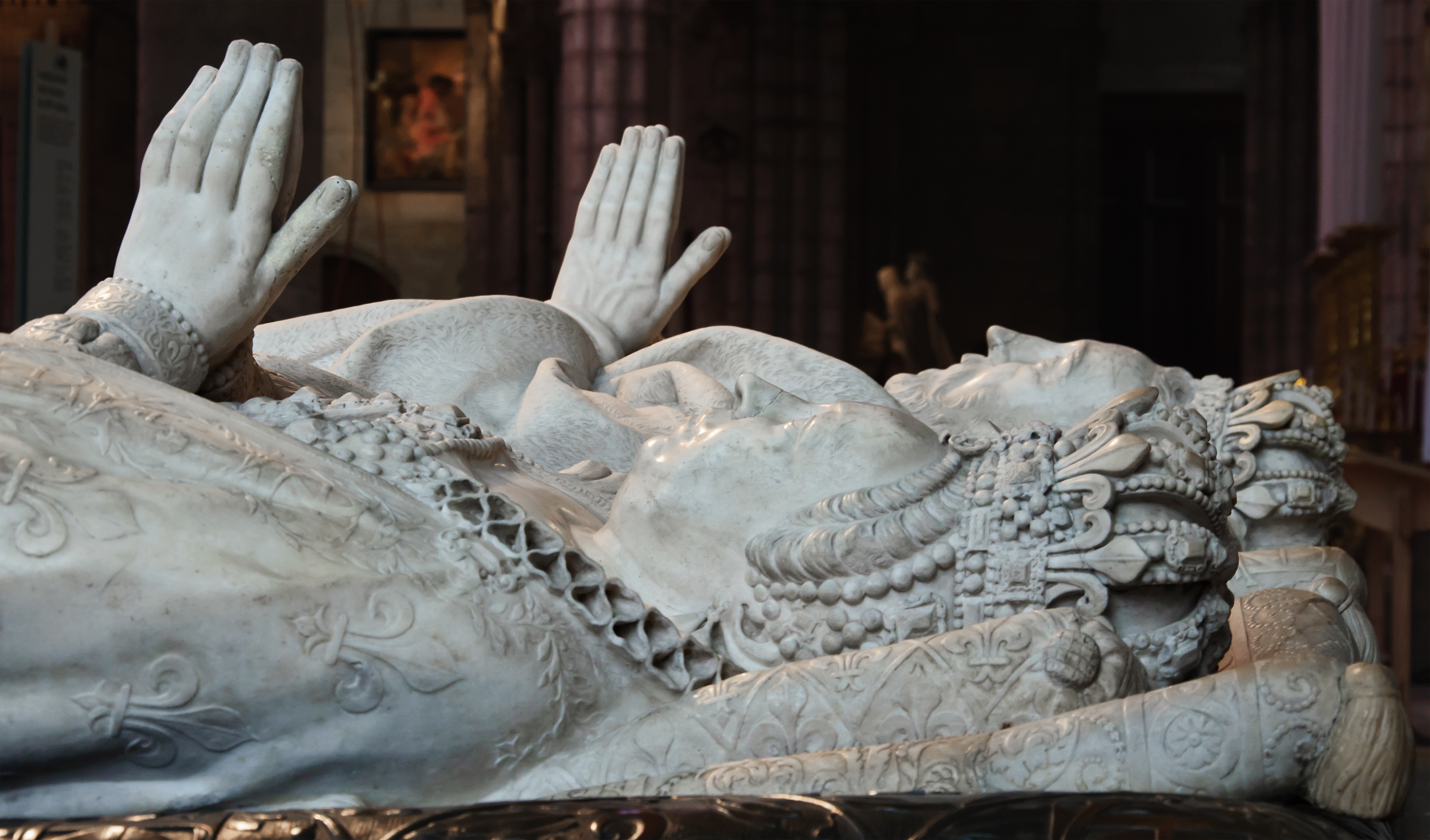
Effigies of Catherine de' Medici and Henry II by Germain Pilon (1583), Basilica of St Denis

On 5 January 1589, Catherine died at the age of 69, probably from pleurisy. L'Estoile wrote: "those close to her believed that her life had been shortened by displeasure over her son's deed." He added that she had no sooner died than she was treated with as much consideration as a dead goat. Because Paris was held by enemies of the crown, Catherine had to be buried provisionally at Blois. Eight months later, Jacques Clément stabbed Henry III to death. At the time, Henry was besieging Paris with the King of Navarre, who would succeed him as Henry IV of France. Henry III's assassination ended nearly three centuries of Valois rule and brought the Bourbon dynasty into power. Years later, Diane, daughter of Henry II and Philippa Duci, had Catherine's remains reinterred in the Saint-Denis basilica in Paris. In 1793, a revolutionary mob tossed her bones into a mass grave with those of the other kings and queens.

Henry IV was later reported to have said of Catherine:

I ask you, what could a woman do, left by the death of her husband with five little children on her arms, and two families of France who were thinking of grasping the crown—our own [the Bourbons] and the Guises? Was she not compelled to play strange parts to deceive first one and then the other, in order to guard, as she did, her sons, who successively reigned through the wise conduct of that shrewd woman? I am surprised that she never did worse.

== Patron of the arts ==
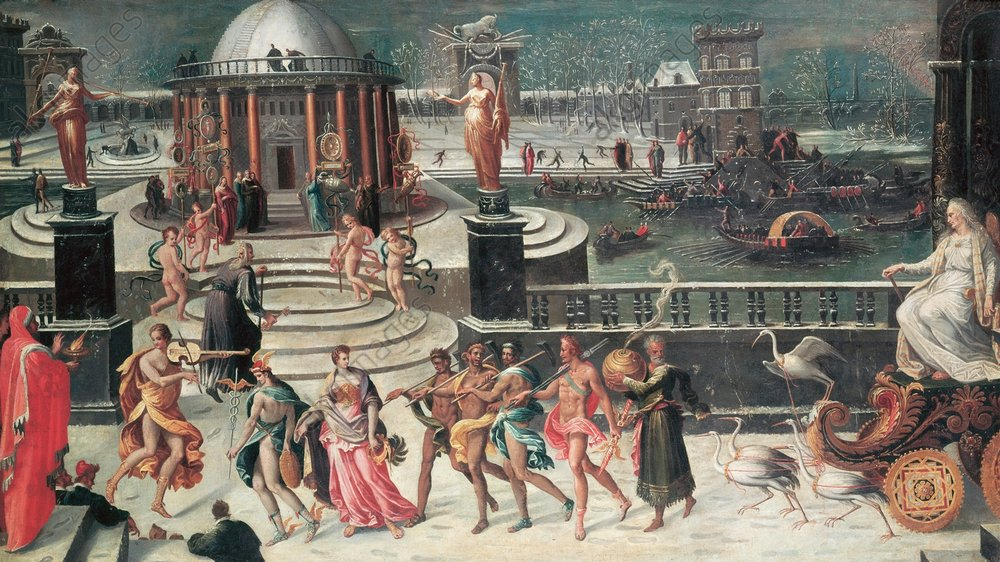
Triumph of Winter, by Antoine Caron, c. 1568

Catherine believed in the humanist ideal of the learned Renaissance prince whose authority depended on letters as well as arms. She was inspired by the example of her father-in-law, King Francis I of France, who had hosted the leading artists of Europe at his court, and by her Medici ancestors. In an age of civil war and declining respect for the monarchy, she sought to bolster royal prestige through lavish cultural display. Once in control of the royal purse, she launched a programme of artistic patronage that lasted for three decades. During this time, she presided over a distinctive late French Renaissance culture in all branches of the arts.

An inventory drawn up at the Hôtel de la Reine after Catherine's death shows her to have been a keen collector. Listed works of art included tapestries, hand-drawn maps, sculptures, rich fabrics, ebony furniture inlaid with ivory, sets of china, and Limoges pottery. There were also hundreds of portraits, for which a vogue had developed during Catherine's lifetime. Many portraits in her collection were by Jean Clouet (1480–1541) and his son François Clouet (c. 1510–1572). François Clouet drew and painted portraits of all Catherine's family and of many members of the court. After Catherine's death, a decline in the quality of French portraiture set in. By 1610, the school patronised by the late Valois court and brought to its pinnacle by François Clouet had all but died out.

Beyond portraiture, little is known about the painting at Catherine de' Medici's court. In the last two decades of her life, only two painters stand out as recognisable personalities: Jean Cousin the Younger (c. 1522 – c. 1594), few of whose works survive, and Antoine Caron (c. 1521–1599), who became Catherine's official painter after working at Fontainebleau under Primaticcio. Caron's vivid Mannerism, with its love of the ceremonial and its preoccupation with massacres, reflects the neurotic atmosphere of the French court during the Wars of Religion.

Many of Caron's paintings, such as those of the Triumphs of the Seasons, are of allegorical subjects that echo the festivities for which Catherine's court was famous. His designs for the Valois Tapestries celebrate the fêtes, picnics, and mock battles of the "magnificent" entertainments hosted by Catherine. They depict events held at Fontainebleau in 1564; at Bayonne in 1565 for the summit meeting with the Spanish court; and at the Tuileries in 1573 for the visit of the Polish ambassadors who presented the Polish crown to Catherine's son Henry of Anjou.

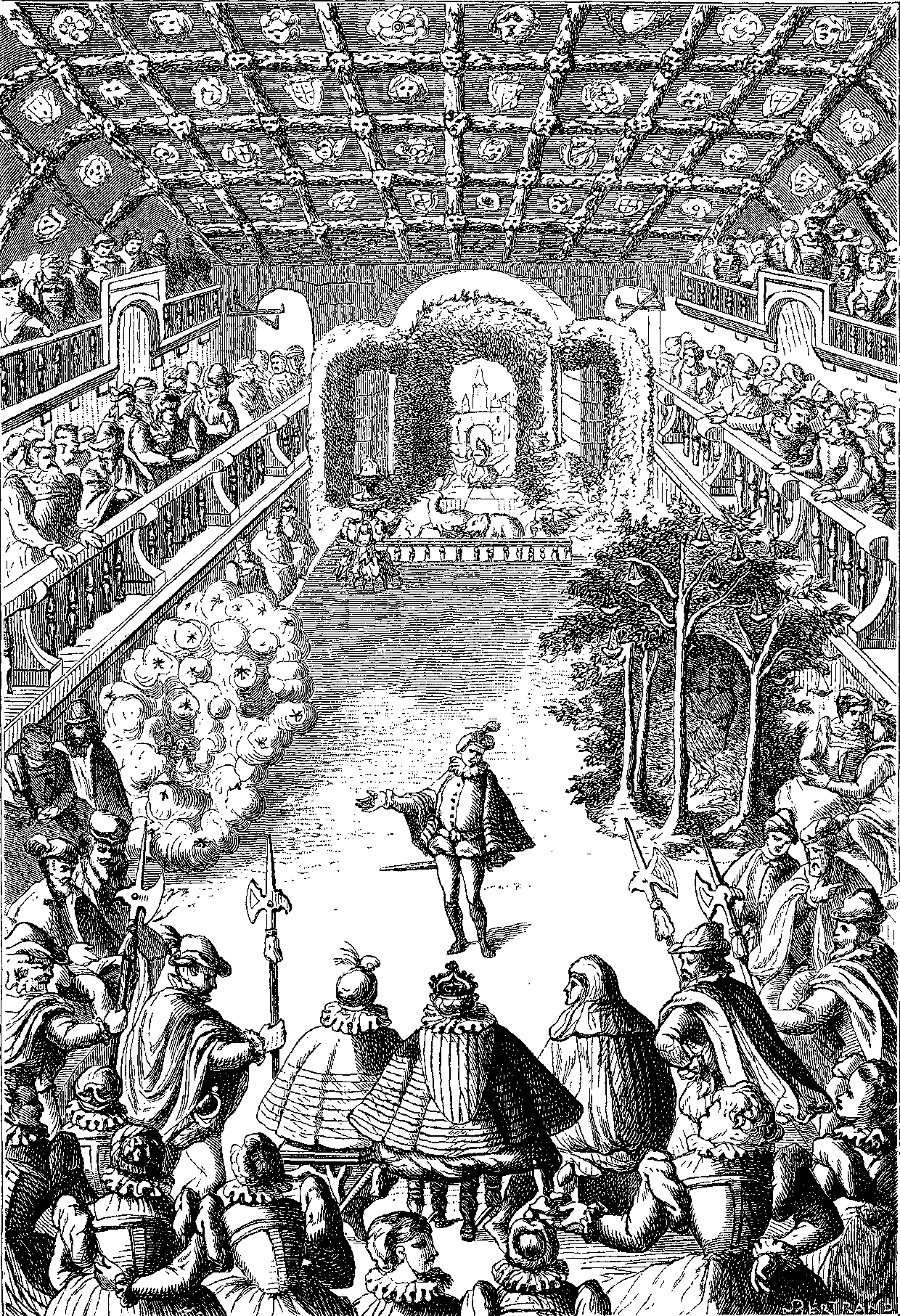
The Ballet Comique de la Reine, from a 1582 engraving by Jacques Patin

The musical shows in particular allowed Catherine to express her creative gifts. They were usually dedicated to the ideal of peace in the realm and based on mythological themes. To create the necessary dramas, music, and scenic effects for these events, Catherine employed the leading artists and architects of the day. Historian Frances Yates has called her "a great creative artist in festivals." Catherine gradually introduced changes to the traditional entertainments: for example, she increased the prominence of dance in the shows that climaxed each series of entertainments. A distinctive new art form, the ballet de cour, emerged from these creative advances. Owing to its synthesis of dance, music, verse, and setting, the production of the Ballet Comique de la Reine in 1581 is regarded by scholars as the first authentic ballet.

Catherine de' Medici's great love among the arts was architecture. "As the daughter of the Medici," suggests French art historian Jean-Pierre Babelon, "she was driven by a passion to build and a desire to leave great achievements behind her when she died." After Henry II's death, Catherine set out to immortalise her husband's memory and to enhance the grandeur of the Valois monarchy through a series of costly building projects. These included work on the Château de Montceaux, Château de Saint-Maur, and Chenonceau. Catherine built two new palaces in Paris: the Tuileries and the Hôtel de la Reine. She was closely involved in the planning and supervising of all her architectural schemes.

Catherine had emblems of her love and grief carved into the stonework of her buildings. Poets lauded her as the new Artemisia, after Artemisia II of Caria, who built the Mausoleum at Halicarnassus as a tomb for her dead husband. As the centrepiece of an ambitious new chapel, she commissioned a magnificent tomb for Henry at the basilica of Saint Denis. It was designed by Francesco Primaticcio (1504–1570), with sculpture by Germain Pilon (1528–1590). Art historian Henri Zerner has called this monument "the last and most brilliant of the royal tombs of the Renaissance." Catherine also commissioned Germain Pilon to carve the marble sculpture that contains Henry II's heart. A poem by Ronsard, engraved on its base, tells the reader not to wonder that so small a vase can hold so large a heart, since Henry's real heart resides in Catherine's breast.

Although Catherine spent ruinous sums on the arts, most of her patronage left no permanent legacy. The end of the Valois dynasty so soon after her death brought a change in priorities.

=== Culinary legend ===
Coat of arms

The legend that de' Medici introduced a long list of foods, techniques and utensils from Italy to France is discredited by food historians. Barbara Ketcham Wheaton and Stephen Mennell provided the definitive arguments against these claims. They point out that Catherine's father-in-law, King Francis I, and the flower of the French aristocracy had dined at some of Italy's most élite tables during the king's Italian campaigns (and that an earlier generation had done so during King Charles VIII's invasion of 1494); that a vast Italian entourage had visited France for the wedding of Catherine de' Medici's father to her French-born mother; and that she had little influence at court until her husband's death because he was so besotted by his mistress, Diane de Poitiers. In fact, a large population of Italians—bankers, silk-weavers, philosophers, musicians, and artists, including Leonardo da Vinci—had emigrated to France to promote the burgeoning Renaissance. Nevertheless, popular culture frequently attributes Italian culinary influence and forks in France to Catherine.

The earliest known reference to Catherine as the popularizer of Italian culinary innovation is the entry for "cuisine" in Diderot and d'Alembert's Encyclopédie published in 1754, which describes haute cuisine as decadent and effeminate and explains that fussy sauces and fancy fricassees arrived in France via "that crowd of corrupt Italians who served at the court of Catherine de' Medici."

== Links to the occult ==
Catherine herself had been educated by Cosimo Ruggeri in astrology and astronomy, which were closely linked in her day and were an academic rather than a Satanic activity, although his general background and favourite status suggests there was more to it than that. It has been suggested that Catherine educated her son, Henry III, in the dark arts, and that "the two devoted themselves to sorceries that were scandals of the age". As a result, some (more extreme) authors believe Catherine to be the creator of the Black Mass, a Satanic inversion of the traditional Catholic Mass, although there is little to prove this aside from Jean Bodin's account in his book De la démonomanie des sorciers. Nevertheless, Catherine was never formally accused or prosecuted despite the fact that her reign experienced the greatest number of prosecutions for witchcraft in Italy. This lends some weight to the suggestion that people were labelled 'witches' simply because they did not act the way a woman would have been expected to act, or simply to suit personal or political agendas. This may be particularly true for Catherine as an Italian woman ruling in France; several historians argue that she was disliked by her French subjects, who labelled her "the Italian woman". In any event, the rumours have made a mark on Catherine's reputation over time, and there are now many dramaticised works about her involvement in the occult.

== Issue ==
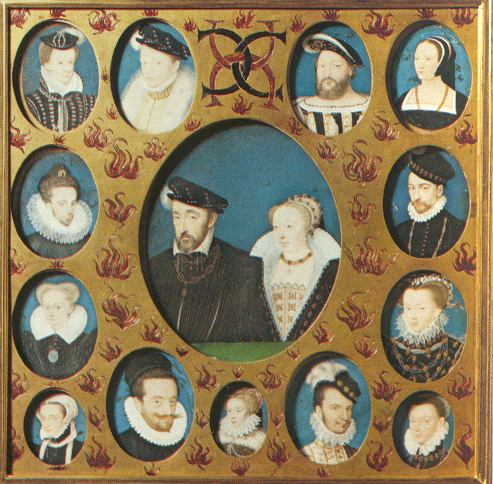
Henry and Catherine family portrait

Catherine de' Medici married Henry, Duke of Orléans, the future Henry II of France, in Marseille on 28 October 1533. She gave birth to ten children, of whom four sons and three daughters survived to marriageable age. Three of her sons became kings of France, while two of her daughters married kings and one married a duke. Catherine outlived all her children except Henry III, who died seven months after her, and Margaret, the only child to have inherited her robust health. Victoire and Jeanne were twin daughters born in 1556; Jeanne was stillborn due to surgeons breaking her legs to save her mother's life; (Note: Some sources claim that Victoire was the one who was stillborn.) Victoire survived, dying less than two months later. According to the diplomat Simon Renard, the birth nearly killed Catherine, and the royal couple were advised by the King's physician to have no further children.

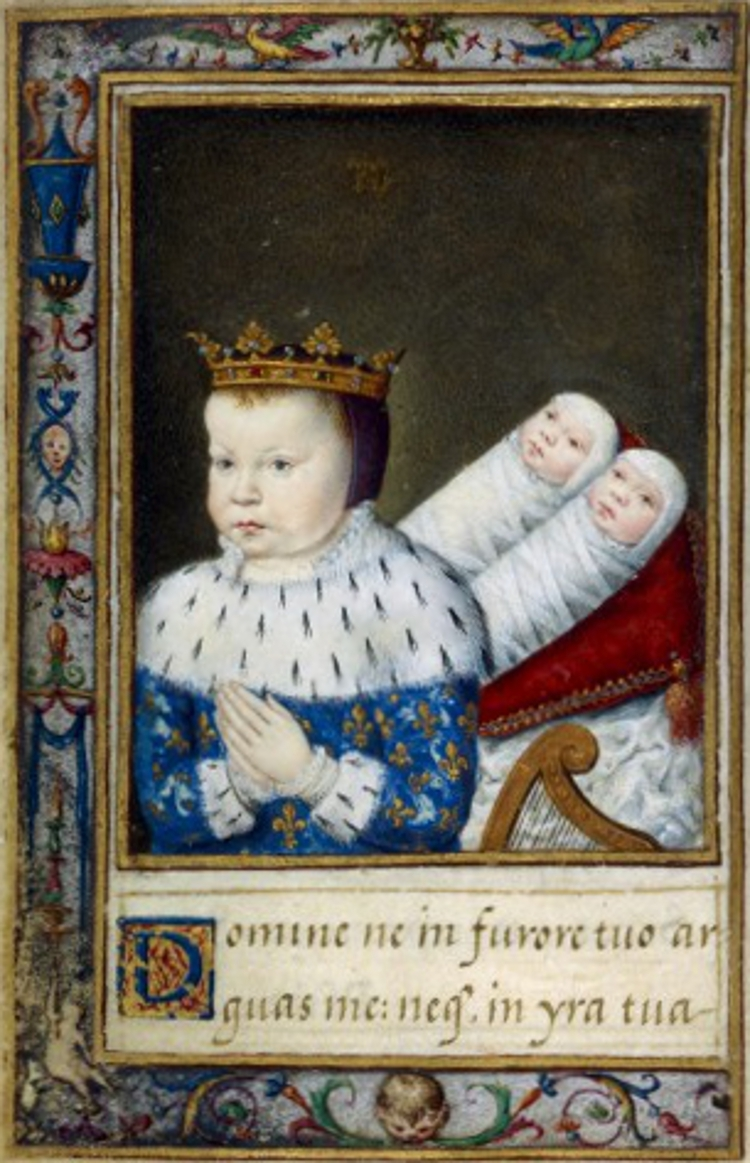
Louis, Victoire and Jeanne, the three children who died in infancy, depicted in Catherine's book of hours

- Francis II, King of France (19 January 1544 – 5 December 1560). Married Mary, Queen of Scots, in 1558.
- Elisabeth (2 April 1545 – 3 October 1568). Married Philip II, King of Spain, in 1559.
- Claude (12 November 1547 – 21 February 1575). Married Charles III, Duke of Lorraine, in 1559.
- Louis, Duke of Orléans (3 February 1549 – 24 October 1550). Died in infancy.
- Charles IX, King of France (27 June 1550 – 30 May 1574). Married Elizabeth of Austria in 1570.
- Henry III, King of France (19 September 1551 – 2 August 1589). Married Louise of Lorraine in 1575.
- Margaret (14 May 1553 – 27 March 1615). Married Henry, King of Navarre, the future Henry IV of France, in 1572.
- Hercules, Duke of Anjou (18 March 1555 – 19 June 1584), renamed Francis when he was confirmed.
- Victoire (24 June 1556 – 17 August 1556). Died in infancy.
- Jeanne (24 June 1556). Stillborn

== Bibliography ==
- Babelon, Jean-Pierre. "The Louvre: Royal Residence and Temple of the Arts". Realms of Memory: The Construction of the French Past. Vol. III: Symbols. Edited by Pierre Nora. English language edition translated by Arthur Goldhammer, edited by Lawrence D. Kritzman. New York: Columbia University Press, 1998. ISBN 0231109261.
- Blunt, Anthony. Art and Architecture in France: 1500–1700. New Haven, Connecticut: Yale University Press, 1999. ISBN 0300077483.
- Brantôme, Pierre de Bourdeille. Illustrious Dames of the Court of the Valois Kings. Translated by Katharine Prescott Wormeley. New York: Lamb, 1912. OCLC 347527
- Bryson, David M. Queen Jeanne and the Promised Land: Dynasty, Homeland, Religion and Violence in Sixteenth-century France. Leiden and Boston, Massachusetts: Brill Academic, 1999. ISBN 9004113789.
- Carroll, Stuart. Noble Power During the French Wars of Religion: The Guise Affinity and the Catholic Cause in Normandy. Cambridge: Cambridge University Press, 2005. ISBN 0521023874.
- Cloulas, Ivan (1979). Catherine de Médicis: Le destin d'une reine. Paris: Fayard, 1979, ISBN 978-2213007380. Digital edition: Paris: Tallandier, 2015, ISBN 979-1021014787.
- Dimier, L. French Painting in the XVI Century. Translated by Harold Child. London: Duckworth, 1904. OCLC 86065266
- Frieda, Leonie (2003). Catherine de Medici: Renaissance Queen of France. New York: HarperCollins, ISBN 0060744928. London: Weidenfeld & Nicolson, ISBN 184212725X. Paperback edition: London: Phoenix, 2005, ISBN 0753820390. [Pagination differs in different editions.]
- Goldstone, Nancy (2015). The Rival Queens: Catherine de' Medici, Her Daughter Marguerite de Valois, and the Betrayal That Ignited a Kingdom (Paperback). London: Weidenfeld & Nicolson. ISBN 978-1780224770.
- Guy, John. My Heart Is My Own: The Life of Mary Queen of Scots. London: Fourth Estate, 2004. ISBN 184115752X.
- Hearn, Karen, ed. Dynasties: Painting in Tudor and Jacobean England, 1530–1630. New York: Rizzoli, 1995. ISBN 084781940X.
- Heller, Henry. Anti-Italianism in Sixteenth-Century France. Toronto: University of Toronto Press, 2003. ISBN 0802036899.
- Heritier, Jean. Catherine de' Medici. Translated by Charlotte Haldane. London: George Allen and Unwin, 1963. OCLC 1678642
- Holt, Mack P. The French Wars of Religion, 1562–1629. Cambridge: Cambridge University Press, 2005. ISBN 0521547504.
- Hoogvliet, Margriet. "Princely Culture and Catherine de Médicis". In Princes and Princely Culture, 1450–1650. Edited by Martin Gosman, Alasdair A. MacDonald, and Arie Johan Vanderjagt. Leiden and Boston, Massachusetts: Brill Academic, 2003. ISBN 9004135723.
- Jollet, Etienne. Jean et François Clouet. Translated by Deke Dusinberre. Paris: Lagune, 1997. ISBN 0500974659.
- Knecht, R. J. Catherine de' Medici. London and New York: Longman, 1998. ISBN 0582082412.
- Knecht, R. J. The Rise and Fall of Renaissance France, 1483–1610. Oxford: Blackwell, 2001. ISBN 0631227296.
- Lee, Carol. Ballet in Western Culture: A History of Its Origins and Evolution. London: Routledge, 2002. ISBN 041594256X.
- Manetsch, Scott Michael. Theodore Beza and the Quest for Peace in France, 1572–1598. Leiden and Boston, Massachusetts : Brill Academic, 2000. ISBN 9004111018.
- Morris, T. A. Europe and England in the Sixteenth Century. London and New York: Routledge, 1998. ISBN 041515040X.
- Neale, J. E. The Age of Catherine de Medici. London: Jonathan Cape, 1943. OCLC 39949296
- Paranque, Estelle. Blood, Fire & Gold: The Story of Elizabeth I & Catherine de Medici. London: Edbury Press, 2022; New York: Hatchette Books, 2022. ISBN 9780306830518.
- Pettegree, Andrew. Europe in the Sixteenth Century. Oxford: Blackwell, 2002. ISBN 063120704X.
- Somervill, Barbara A. Catherine de Medici: The Power Behind the French Throne. Compass Point Books, 2005. ISBN 0756515815
- Strage, Mark. Women of Power: The Life and Times of Catherine de' Medici. New York and London: Harcourt, Brace Jovanovich, 1976. ISBN 0151983704
- Sutherland, N. M. Catherine de Medici and the Ancien Régime. London: Historical Association, 1966. OCLC 1018933
- Sutherland, N. M. The French Secretaries of State in the Age of Catherine de Medici. London: Athlone Press, 1962. OCLC 1367811
- Sutherland, N. M. The Massacre of St Bartholomew and the European Conflict, 1559–1572. London: Macmillan, 1973. ISBN 0333136292.
- Sutherland, N. M. Princes, Politics and Religion: 1547–1589. London: Hambledon Press, 1984. ISBN 0907628443.
- Strong, Roy. Art and Power: Renaissance Festivals, 1450–1650. Woodbridge, UK: Boydell Press, 1984. ISBN 0851152473.
- Thomson, David. Renaissance Paris: Architecture and Growth, 1475–1600. Berkeley: University of California Press, 1984. ISBN 0520053478. Retrieved 21 March 2008.
- Wilson, Ian. Nostradamus: The Evidence. London: Orion, 2003. ISBN 075284279X.
- Wood, James B. The King's Army: Warfare, Soldiers and Society during the Wars of Religion in France, 1562–76. Cambridge: Cambridge University Press, 1996. ISBN 0521550033.
- Yates, Frances. The Valois Tapestries. 1959. London: Routledge & Kegan Paul, 1999. ISBN 0415220432.
- Zerner, Henri. Renaissance Art in France. The Invention of Classicism. Translated by Deke Dusinberre, Scott Wilson, and Rachel Zerner. Paris: Flammarion, 2003. ISBN 2080111442.
- (in French) Zvereva, Alexandra. Les Clouet de Catherine de Médicis. Paris: Somogy, Éditions d'Art; Musée Condé, Château de Chantilly, 2002. ISBN 2850565709.
- Young, G.F. The Medici: Volume II. 1920. London: John Murray. OCLC 288522172

Catherine de' Medici House of Medici Born: 13 April 1519 Died: 5 January 1589
French royalty
Vacant Title last held by Margaret of Foix	Duchess consort of Brittany; 10 August 1536 – 31 March 1547	Duchy disbanded
Preceded by Eleanor of Austria	Queen consort of France; 31 March 1547 – 10 July 1559	Succeeded by Mary Stuart
French nobility
Preceded by Anne de la Tour d'Auvergne	Countess of Auvergne; 16 June 1524 – 5 January 1589	Succeeded by Charles de Valois
