= Francis, Dauphin of France =

Francis, Dauphin of France may refer to:

- Francis III of Brittany, Dauphin of France in 1518–1536, son and heir of Francis I of France
- Francis II of France, Dauphin of France in 1544–1560, son and heir of Henry II of France
- Francis, Dauphin of France (1466), died in infancy, son and heir of Louis XI of France
- Francis, Dauphin of France (1497), died in infancy, son and heir of Charles VIII of France
