= Sebastiano de Montecuccoli =

Italian noble (died 1536)

Coat of arms of Count Sebastiano de Montecuccoli

Count Sebastiano de Montecuccoli, also spelt Montecucoli or Montecuculli (died 7 October 1536) was an Italian nobleman in the service of Francis I of France, executed for allegedly having poisoned the King's eldest son.

Montecuccoli was secretary to the Dauphin Francis, the heir to the French throne. After the unexpected death of the Dauphin in Tournon on 10 August 1536, Montecuccoli was suspected of having poisoned the thirsty young man by bringing him a glass of cold water after a game of tennis on 2 August. The Dauphin had been over-heated. An autopsy report concluded the Dauphin died of natural causes. Nevertheless, suspicions were aroused. Some thought the Dauphin's younger brother Henry and Henry's wife Catherine de' Medici might be behind it, since she benefited most from his death. After the death of the Dauphin Francis, Henry and Catherine automatically became the new Dauphin and Dauphine, the first in line to become King and Queen of France. Others thought the Holy Roman Emperor Charles V might be involved. A book about toxicology was found in Montecuccoli's possession, and he had previously been in the service of Charles V, but had come to France with Catherine. Under torture Montecuccoli confessed to having tried to poison King Francis and the Dauphin on behalf of the Emperor. Later he retracted his confession, but was executed by écartèlement at the Place de la Grenette in Lyon on 7 October 1536. This manner of execution was reserved for regicides and meant that the victim was torn to pieces by four horses galloping into four different directions. Charles V officially protested against the charges levelled at his government. The true cause of the Dauphin's death is believed to have been pleurisy, or more likely tuberculosis.
