= Francis III of Brittany =

Francis III
- Dauphin of France
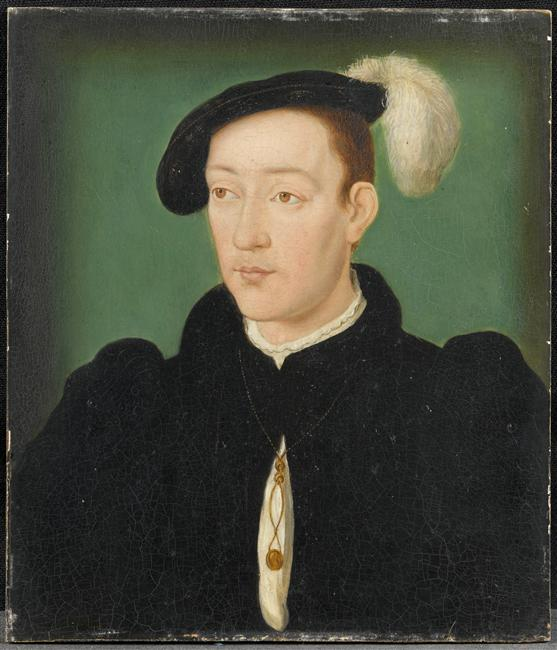
- Portrait by Corneille de Lyon

Duke of Brittany
- Reign: 20 July 1524 – 10 August 1536
- Predecessor: Claude
- Successor: Henry II
- Born: 28 February 1518; Château d'Amboise
- Died: 10 August 1536 (aged 18); Château de Tournon
- Burial: Saint Denis Basilica
- House: Valois-Angoulême
- Father: Francis I of France
- Mother: Claude, Duchess of Brittany
- Religion: Roman Catholicism

Francis III (Breton: Frañsez; French: François; 28 February 1518 – 10 August 1536) was Dauphin of France and, after 1524, Duke of Brittany. Francis and his brother, Henry, were exchanged as hostages for their father, Francis I, who had been captured at the Battle of Pavia. They would be hostages for three years. Made Duke of Brittany in 1532, this precipitated Brittany's integration with the Kingdom of France. Francis died 10 August 1536, possibly from tuberculosis.

== Life ==
Francis was the first son of King Francis I of France and Duchess Claude of Brittany. His father said of Francis at birth, "a beautiful dauphin who is the most beautiful and strong child one could imagine and who will be the easiest to bring up." His mother said, "tell the King that he is even more beautiful than himself." The Dauphin was christened at Amboise on 25 April 1519. Leonardo da Vinci, who had been brought to Amboise by Francis I, designed the decorations.

One of the most researched aspects of the Dauphin's short life is the time he and his brother Henry (later Henry II of France) spent as hostages in Spain. The king had been badly defeated and captured at the Battle of Pavia (1525) and became a prisoner of Emperor Charles V, initially in the Alcázar in Madrid. In order to ensure his release, the king signed the Treaty of Madrid (1526). However, in order to ensure that Francis abided by the treaty, Charles demanded that the king's two older sons take his place as hostages. Francis agreed.

On 15 March 1526, the exchange took place at the border between Spain and France. Francis almost immediately repudiated the treaty and the eight-year-old Dauphin and his younger brother Henry spent the next three years as captives of Charles V, a period that scarred them for life.

During his confinement in Spain, the Dauphin displayed a notably subdued demeanor compared to his more aggressive brother and seemed "to have accepted the rationale for his imprisonment reasonably well." Nevertheless, the experience led him to become somewhat isolated, favoring black attire (like a Spaniard) and exhibiting a contemplative disposition seen as more Spanish than French.

== Marriage arrangements ==
As the first son and heir of the King of France, the Dauphin was a marriage pawn for his father. There were several betrothals to eligible princesses throughout the Dauphin's life. The first was when he was an infant, to the four-year-old Mary Tudor (later Mary I of England), daughter of Henry VIII of England and Catherine of Aragon; this arrangement was made as a surety for the Anglo-French alliance signed in October 1518, but abandoned around 1521 when Mary was instead betrothed to Charles V.

== Duchy of Brittany ==
In 1524, the Dauphin inherited the Duchy of Brittany on his mother's death, becoming Duke Francis III, although the Duchy was actually ruled by officials of the French crown. In 1532, after much discourse with the Breton deputies, demands were laid before the French crown. The Dauphin was to arrive at Rennes as duke and owner of the duchy, King Francis would be granted usufruct (use of it) and management of it and, after the union with France, the Dauphin would sign an oath that respects the duchy's rights and privileges. Francis agreed to these demands and passed an edict annexing the Duchy of Brittany to France. On 14 August 1532, the Dauphin was crowned Duke Francis III in Rennes Cathedral.

Upon Henry's succession to the French throne in 1547, the Duchy and the crown were effectively merged, the Breton estates having already tied the succession of the Duchy to the French crown. This resulted in the former duchy effectively becoming the Province of Brittany.

== Death ==
The Dauphin Francis died at the Château de Tournon on 10 August 1536, at the age of eighteen. The circumstances of his death appeared suspicious, and many believed he was poisoned. However, there is considerable evidence suggesting that he died of natural causes, possibly tuberculosis.

After playing a round of tennis at a jeu de paume court "pré[s] d'Ainay", the Dauphin asked for a cup of water, which was brought to him by his secretary, Count Montecuccoli. Shortly after drinking it, Francis collapsed and died several days later. Montecuccoli, who had been brought to the court by Catherine de' Medici, was accused of being in the pay of Charles V. When his quarters were searched, a book detailing several types of poison was discovered. Under torture, Montecuccoli confessed to poisoning the Dauphin and was subsequently executed.

== Sources ==
- Bietenholz, Peter G. (1986). "Francis, dauphin of France". In Bietenholz, Peter G.; Deutscher, Thomas Brian (eds.). Contemporaries of Erasmus: A Biographical Register of the Renaissance and Reformation. Vol. 2. University of Toronto Press. pp. 52–53.
- Glenn, Richardson (2014). The Field of Cloth of Gold. New Haven: Yale University Press. pp. 6, 189. ISBN 9780300160390. OCLC 862814775.
- Knecht, Robert (2007). The Valois: Kings of France, 1328-1589. Hambledon Continuum. ISBN 9781852855222.
- Seward, Desmond (1973). Prince of the Renaissance: The Golden Life of François I. New York: Macmillan Publishing Co. ISBN 9780026097000.
- Baumgartner, Frederic J (1988). Henry II, King of France, 1547–1559. Duke University Press. ISBN 9780822307952.
- Williams, H. Noel (1910). Henry II: His Court and Times. ISBN 9785518683754.

Francis III of Brittany House of Valois, Orléans-Angoulême branch Cadet branch of the Capetian dynasty Born: 28 February 1518 Died: 10 August 1536
Regnal titles
Preceded by Claude	Duke of Brittany; 20 July 1524 – 10 August 1536	Succeeded by Henry
French royalty
Vacant Title last held by Francis	Dauphin of France; 28 February 1518 – 10 August 1536	Succeeded by Henry
